= Ship replica =

Reconstruction of a no longer existing ship

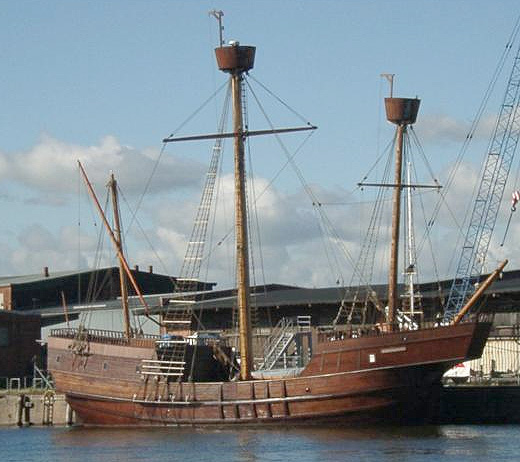
A replica of the 15th-century caravel Lisa von Lübeck.

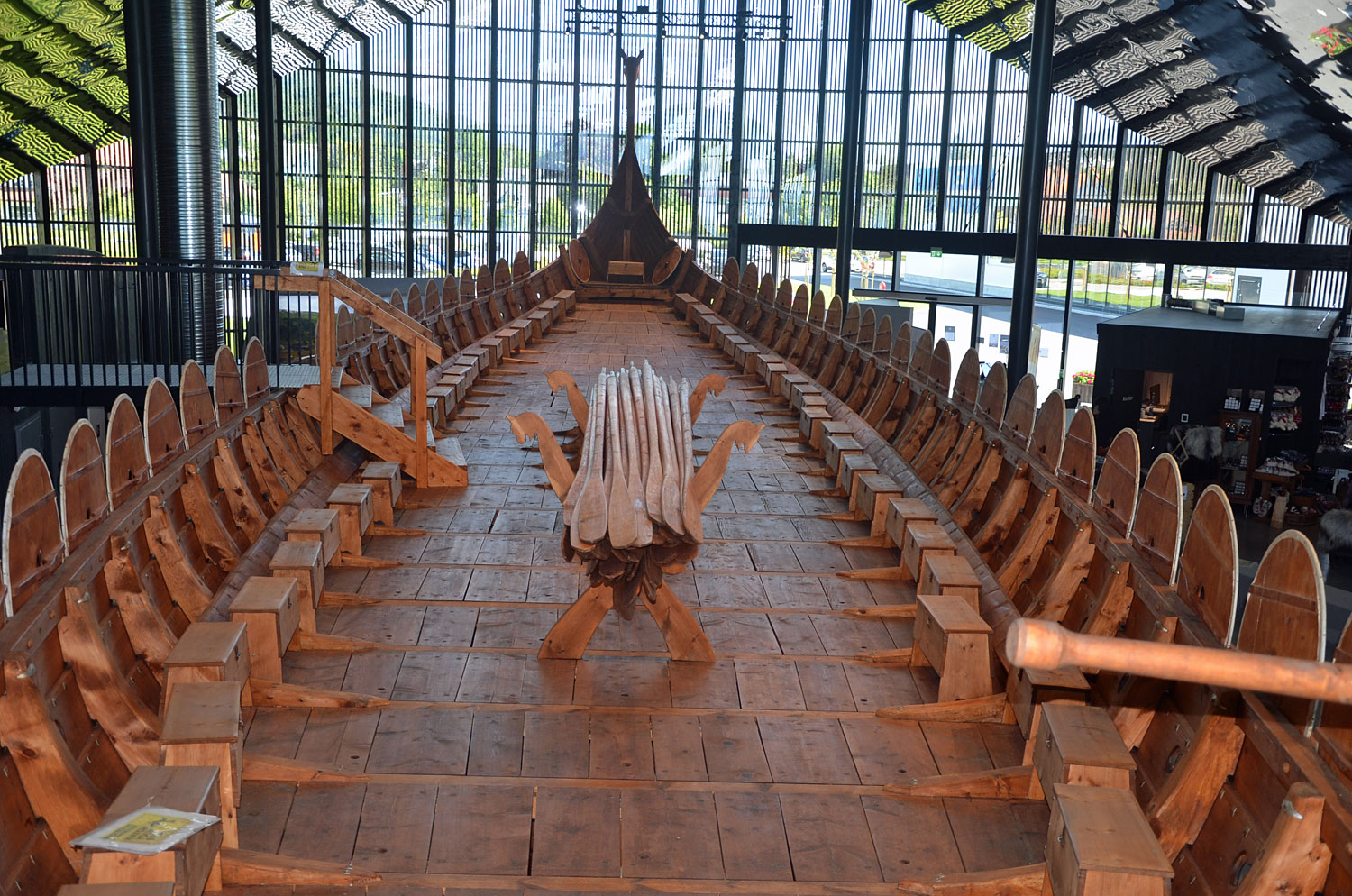
The Myklebust ship replica in Sagastad

A ship replica is a reconstruction of a no longer existing ship. Replicas can range from authentically reconstructed, fully seaworthy ships, to ships of modern construction that give an impression of a historic vessel. Some replicas may not even be seaworthy, but built for other educational or entertainment purposes.

Reasons to build a replica include historic research into shipbuilding, national pride, exposition at a museum or entertainment (e.g., for a TV series), and/or education programs for the unemployed. For example, see the project to build a replica of the Continental brig Andrew Doria. Apart from building a genuine replica of the ship, sometimes the construction materials, tools and methods can also copied from the ships' original era, as is the case with the replica of Batavia in Lelystad and the ship of the line replica Delft in Rotterdam (Delfshaven).

== Definition ==
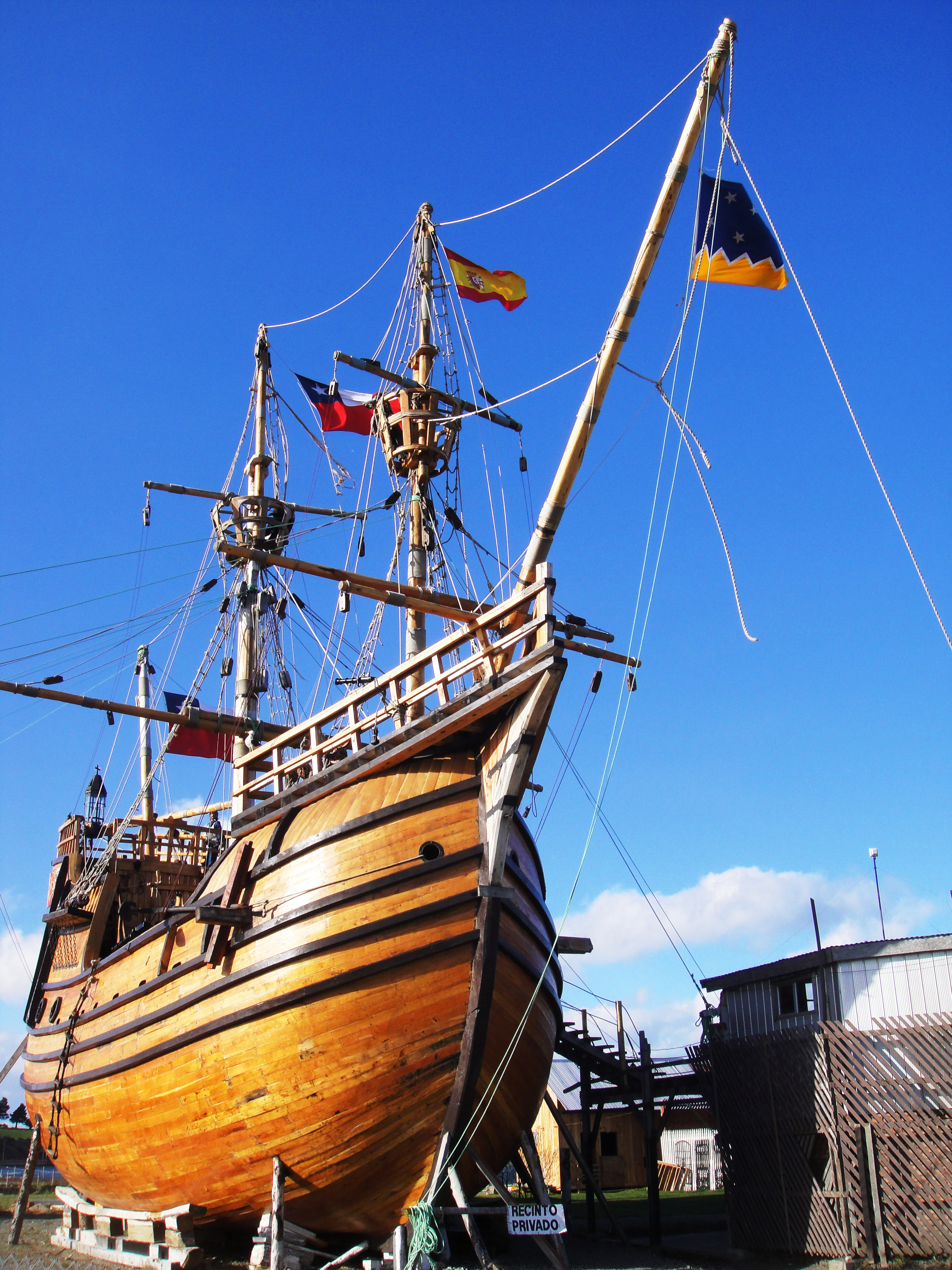
Replica of Magellan's ship Nao Victoria at Museo Nao Victoria in Punta Arenas

The term "replica" in this context does not normally include scale models. The term museum ship is used for an old ship that has been preserved and converted into a museum open to the public.

A ship replica may also be a generic replica, one that represents a certain type of ship rather than a particular historic example, like Kamper Kogge, replicating the Cogs that were used extensively in Northern Europe by the Hanseatic League in the Middle Ages, but where there is little knowledge of specific ships.

Some generic type replicas such as Thor Heyerdahl's Ra II, qualify as true replicas as these ships were built to investigate the craft and or culture of the original era. That they do not replicate a specific vessel is mainly because no details of such a specific vessel are available.

Some other ships that are modeled after ships of a certain type or era (and are in that sense replicas) do not qualify as true replicas. Some ships may be borderline cases, such as Kanrin Maru, which is actually twice the size of the original, but built following the plans of the original.

Replicas can be temporary, cheap and very simple, such as the replica of a Viking ship that was burnt at the Leixlip Festival.

Notable historic type ships that are not replicas include:

- USS Constitution (1795) is strictly speaking not a replica but the original vessel. However, most of the ship's timber has been replaced over time, with only 10-15% of the original remaining. This is a modern version of the philosopher's dilemma concerning replica versus original; known as the Ship of Theseus dilemma.
- HMS Victory (1765) is still the original vessel, although unlike Constitution, she is in dry dock and does not sail. She has also been heavily restored, with only 10-15% of her original timber remaining.
- Mircea, which is an almost exact copy of Gorch Fock. Mircea was built as a copy because Gorch Fock was a very successful ship. Thus Mircea was not built as a replica per se, but as a copy for other reasons (i.e. to perform economically, in this case as a training vessel).
- Stad Amsterdam is a generic clipper type ship combining the best qualities of clippers of the past with modern materials and technologies.

Another ambiguous case subject to the Ship of Theseus dilemma is Niagara. The original was sunk in 1820 for preservation, and the ship has been rebuilt three times since. The third reconstruction was considerably more extensive, and the only parts from the original which were retained are non-structural, leading many authorities to classify her as a replica, rather than a reconstructed original.

== Notable ship replicas ==
Some sailing ship replicas with their home port; and key information of the original (many articles are about the original ship):

=== Europe, Middle East, Australia and the Americas ===
Ship name	Type	Current port^{a}	Current affiliation	Country	Original affiliation	Original built	Notable for	End	Remark
Ra II	Reed boat	Oslo, Norway	Bygdøy maritime museum	Egypt		c.4000BC	Ancient Egyptian merchant. Heyerdahl crossed Atlantic in it	c.2000BC	Class replica
Min of the Desert	Seafaring ship	Suez, Egypt	Suez National Museum	Egypt		c.1500BC	18th Dynasty trading ship		Class replica
Uluburun II	Merchant	Bodrum, Turkey	Bodrum Underwater Archaeological Museum	Turkey		c.14th century BC	Late Bronze Age merchant	Sank c.1316–1305 BC	Oldest known merchant shipwreck.
Argo	Bronze Age galley			Greece		c.1300BC	Hand built replica of a Bronze Age galley	?	Class replica
Argo	Penteconter	Volos, Greece		Greece		?	A replica of a Greek penteconter, with a 50-oar crew made up from all 27 European Union member countries.	?	Class replica
Ivlia	Dieris			Ukraine		c.600BC	Ancient Greek rowing warship (galley) with oars at two levels.	c.100BC	Class replica
Melqart	Phoenician merchant ship			Ukraine		c. 900BC	Phoenician merchant ship.	c.600BC	Class replica
Phoenician	Phoenician merchant ship			United Kingdom		c.600BC	Phoenician merchant ship.	c.525BC	Based on the wreck of the ancient Greek ship Marseille 4 (Jules Verne 7)
Kybele	Bireme	Istanbul, Turkey		Turkey		c.600BC	Phoacean Greek bireme	?	Class replica
Olympias	Trireme	Faliro, Greece		Greece		c.700BC	Ancient Greek warship	c.400BC	Class replica
Le Gyptis	Ancient Greek coastal fishing boat	Marseille, France		France		c.6th century BC	Phoacean coastal fishing boat.	c.6th century BC	Based on the wreck of the ancient Greek fishing boat Jules Vernes 9
Ma'agan Michael II	Merchant	Haifa, Israel	Cypriot merchant ship	Israel		c.5th century BC	Ancient Cypriot small merchant ship	5th century BCE	Ma'agan Michael Ship replica
Kyrenia II	Merchant			Cyprus		c.4th century BC	Ancient Greek merchant ship	Sank c.288BC	Several replicas
Kyrenia III	Merchant	Fukuoka, Japan		Japan		c.4th century BC	Ancient Greek merchant ship	Sank c.288BC	Several replicas
Kyrenia Liberty	Merchant					c.4th century BC	Ancient Greek merchant ship	Sank c.288BC	Several replicas
Hugin	Viking ship	Ramsgate, England	Plinthed at Pegwell Bay	Denmark		c. 9th century AD	Hengist and Horsa land in Kent		Built to commemorate the 5th-century arrival of Anglo-Saxons in Britain, but based on the 9th Century Gokstad ship.
Brendan's currach	Currach	Craggaunowen, Ireland		Ireland		512-530	Legendary voyage across the Atlantic Ocean to America in a small open boat	?	
Myklebust Ship	Viking ship	Myklebust Burial Mound in Nordfjordeid	Sagastad –in Nordfjordeid	Norway		was built in the 800s.	Norway's biggest Viking ship	end of 800 (876?)	The building will be built by Eid Industrihus KF with construction start in 2017 in the new Saga park in Nordfjordeid center.
Sea Stallion from Glendalough	Viking ship	Roskilde	Viking Ship Museum in Roskilde	Denmark		1042 in Dublin Ireland	Main warship of the Viking age	Scuttled in Roskilde Fjord c.1100	
Sebbe Als	Viking ship	Augustenborg		Denmark		Around 1050, somewhere in the Baltic area	Baltic warship of the Viking age	Scuttled in Roskilde Fjord c.1100	
Anna Yaroslavna	Slavic ship			Ukraine		c.1100 in Kyiv	Main type of ships in medieval Russia	c.1100	Class replica
Lisa von Lübeck	Hanseatic cog	Lübeck, Germany		Germany		c.1200	Main medieval merchant	c.1500	Class replica
Kamper Kogge	Hanseatic cog	Kampen, the Netherlands		Netherlands		c.1200	Main medieval merchant	c.1500	Class replica
Roland von Bremen	Bremen cog	Bremen, Germany		Germany		1380	Main medieval merchant	Sank 1380	
Notorious	Caravel	Australia		Australia		c.1480	Caravel		Class replica
São Cristóvão	Caravel	Mossel Bay, South Africa	Bartolomeu Dias Museum Complex	Portugal		1488	Bartolomeu Dias' ship		
Santa María	Carrack	Columbus, US 39°57′47″N 83°00′20″W		United States		c.1490	Columbus's 1492 squadron	Grounded 1492	Several replicas, all based on conjectures
Santa María	Carrack	Palos de la Frontera, Spain 37°12′41″N 6°55′41″W	Wharf of the Caravels museum	Spain		c.1490	Columbus's 1492 squadron	Grounded 1492	Several replicas, all based on conjectures
Santa María	Carrack	Edmonton, Alberta, Canada 53°31′22″N 113°37′36″W	West Edmonton Mall	Canada		c.1490	Columbus's 1492 squadron	Grounded 1492	Several replicas, all based on conjectures
Santa María	Carrack	Funchal, Portugal 32°38′30″N 16°55′00″W		Portugal		c.1490	Columbus's 1492 squadron	Grounded 1492	Several replicas, all based on conjectures
Pinta	Caravel	Tortola, British Virgin Islands	The Columbus Foundation	British Virgin Islands		c.1490	Columbus's 1492 squadron		Several replicas, all based on conjectures
Pinta	Caravel	Palos de la Frontera, Spain 37°12′42″N 6°55′41″W	Wharf of the Caravels museum	Spain		c.1490	Columbus's 1492 squadron		Several replicas, all based on conjectures
Pinta	Caravel	Bayona, Spain 42°7′16″N 8°50′48″W	Caravel Pinta Museum	Spain		c.1490	Columbus's 1492 squadron		Several replicas, all based on conjectures
Niña	Caravel	Tortola, British Virgin Islands	The Columbus Foundation	British Virgin Islands		c.1490	Columbus's 1492 squadron		Several replicas, all based on conjectures
Niña	Caravel	Palos de la Frontera, Spain 37°12′40″N 6°55′42″W	Wharf of the Caravels museum	Spain		c.1490	Columbus's 1492 squadron		Several replicas, all based on conjectures
Niña	Caravel	El Puerto de Santa María, Spain 36°34′41″N 6°15′23″W		Spain		c.1490	Columbus's 1492 squadron		Several replicas, all based on conjectures
Niña	Caravel	Corpus Christi, US 27°47′38″N 97°23′27″W		United States		c.1490	Columbus's 1492 squadron		Several replicas, all based on conjectures
Matthew	Caravel	Bristol, UK	The Matthew of Bristol Trust	United Kingdom		c.1495	John Cabot's ship to America in 1497		In 1997, retraced Cabot's original journey across the Atlantic
Nau Capitânia	Nau	Rio de Janeiro, Brazil	Brazilian Naval Cultural Centre	Brazil		ca 1500	Discovery of Brazil by Pedro Álvares Cabral		Class replica
Victoria	Carrack	Seville, Spain	Fundacion Nao Victoria	Spain		c.1515	Only survivor of Magellan's 1519-1522 first attempt at circumnavigation of the planet		Achieved the circumnavigation of the globe again in 2006.
Victoria	Carrack	Punta Arenas, Chile	Nao Victoria Museum	Chile		c.1515	Only survivor of Magellan's 1519-1522 first attempt at circumnavigation of the planet		
Victoria	Carrack	Puerto San Julián, Argentina 49°18′46″S 67°42′52″W	Museo Tematico Nao Victoria	Argentina		c.1515	Only survivor of Magellan's 1519-1522 first attempt at circumnavigation of the planet		
Grande Hermine	Carrack	Jordan Harbour, Ontario				c.1520	Brought Jacques Cartier to Saint-Pierre on 15 June 1535		abandoned, vandalised and arsoned, beached
San Salvador	Galleon	San Diego Bay, Spain	Maritime Museum of San Diego, United States 32°43′15″N 117°10′30″W	US		1540	First European exploration of Coastal California 1542-43		
Real	Galley	Barcelona, Spain		Spain		c.1570	Flagship of Don John of Austria in the Battle of Lepanto		
Golden Hind(e)	Galleon	London, UK		United Kingdom		c.1575	1577-1580 circumnavigation		
Golden Hind(e)	Galleon	Brixham, UK		United Kingdom		c.1575	1577-1580 circumnavigation		Second replica of the ship anchored in 1963 used in the TV series Sir Francis Drake
Duyfken	East Indies Explorer	Perth, Australia		Netherlands		1595	Discovery of Australia 1606	Irreparable damage 1608	
Andalucía (es:)	Galleon	Seville, Spain	Fundacion Nao Victoria	Spain		c.1600	Main Spanish galleon		
Discovery	Barque	Jamestown, US	Jamestown Settlement museum	United Kingdom		1602	First permanent English settlement in North America, 1607		
Godspeed	Brigantine	Jamestown, US	Jamestown Settlement museum	United States		c.1605	First permanent English settlement in North America, 1607		The 1984/85 replica sailed the Atlantic (without the aid of engines) departing London on April 30, 1985, with a crew of 14.
Susan Constant	Merchant	Jamestown, US	Jamestown Settlement museum	United Kingdom		c.1605	First permanent English settlement in North America, 1607		
Virginia	Pinnace	Bath, Maine, USA	Maine's First Ship	United States	England	1607	First English ship built in America		
Halve Maen	Jacht	Hoorn, Netherlands		Netherlands		c.1608	Original explorer of what is now called the Hudson River, Henry Hudson, 1609	Destroyed around 1618 in Jakarta	
San Juan Bautista	Galleon	Ishinomaki, Japan		Japan		1613	Crossed the Pacific Ocean from Japan to New Spain in 1614	Sold to the Spanish government in 1618	Survived the 2011 Tōhoku earthquake and tsunami with minor damage
Mayflower II	Merchant	Plymouth, Massachusetts, US		United States		c.1607	Pilgrim ship 1620	Dismantled 1623?	
Kalmar Nyckel	Dutch full-rigged pinnace	Kalmar Nyckel Foundation, US		Sweden		1625	Founded New Sweden colony at Fort Christina (Wilmington, Delaware, USA)	Late 17th century	Charters, Daysails, Appearances
Batavia	East Indiaman	Lelystad, The Netherlands		Netherlands		1628	Mutiny 1629	Wrecked 1629	
Prins Willem	East Indiaman	Den Helder, the Netherlands		Netherlands		1649		Sank 1662	Replica destroyed in fire, July 2009
Nonsuch	Ketch	Winnipeg, Manitoba, Canada	Manitoba Museum, Winnipeg, Manitoba, Canada	United Kingdom		1650	Original trading mission into Hudson Bay 1668–69) for precursor of the Hudson's Bay Company	Unknown (possibly sunk in the 1670s)	Crafted for 1970 tercentenary of HBC. Sailed up and down Atlantic and Pacific coasts of North America.
De Zeven Provinciën	Ship of the line (80 guns)	Lelystad, the Netherlands		Netherlands		1665	Flagship of Michiel de Ruyter	Decommissioned 1694	Construction halted due to financial shortfall
Lenox	Ship of the line (70 guns)	Proposed for Deptford, London, UK	Proposed Deptford Dockyard Museum	United Kingdom		1678	Took part in capture of Gibraltar (1704)	Scuttled to serve as breakwater in 1756	Proposed (in 2013) full-size sailing replica, to be built in a dedicated museum on the site of old Deptford Dockyard where the original was built.
Goto Predestinatsia	Ship of the line (58 guns)	Voronezh	Voronezh shipyard	Russia	Russian Navy Ensign	1700	First ship of the line of Russia	1712 sold	Ship-museum
Shtandart	Frigate (28 guns)	Saint Petersburg	Baltic ports	Russia	Russian Navy Ensign	1703	Flagship of Peter the Great of Russia	1727 Decommissioned	Sail training vessel
Poltava	Ship of the line (54 guns)	Saint Petersburg	Lakhta harbor	Russia	Russian Navy Ensign	1709	The first battleship laid down and built at the St. Petersburg Admiralty	Dismantled 1732	Sail training vessel
Götheborg	East Indiaman	Gothenburg, Sweden	Globetrotter	Sweden	SOIC	c.1740		Sank 1745	Sail training vessel (volunteers)
Amsterdam	East Indiaman	Amsterdam, the Netherlands	Scheepvaart Museum	Netherlands		1749		Grounded 1749	
Lady Washington	Brig	Aberdeen, US		United States	Private Owner	c.1750	First US merchant to reach Japan	Foundered 1798	
Jacobstads Wapen	Galeas	Jakobstad, Finland		Sweden		c.1750			
Surprise/Rose	Frigate	San Diego, US	San Diego Maritime Museum	United Kingdom		1757	Built for the Seven Years' War	Scuttled 1779	Renamed Surprise after movie Master and Commander
HMS Sultana	Schooner	Chestertown, Maryland, US		United Kingdom		1767	US colony coast patrol	Sold 1772	
Endeavour	Barque	Sydney, Australia	Australian National Maritime Museum	United Kingdom		1768	Captain Cook's ship		
La Grace	Brig			Czech Republic		ca 1768	Named after earlier frigate of Augustin Heřman		Class replica
Beaver	Brig	Boston USA	Boston Tea Party Ships and Museum	United Kingdom		ca 1770	One of the merchant ships involved in the "Boston Tea Party" protest in 1773		Generic period merchant ship
Eleanor	Brig	Boston USA	Boston Tea Party Ships and Museum	United Kingdom		ca 1770	One of the merchant ships involved in the "Boston Tea Party" protest in 1773		Generic period merchant ship
Hector	Fluyt	Pictou, Canada	Ship Hector Foundation	Canada	Scotland	ca 1720	Immigrant Ship	after 1773	
l'Hermione	12-pounder Concorde-class frigate	Rochefort, France	L'Association Hermione-La Fayette	France		1779	Used by Lafayette during the American Revolutionary War	Sank 1792	Replica Hermione started sea trials in September 2014; set sail for comemorial voyage on April 18, 2015.
Delft	Ship of the Line (56-gun)	Rotterdam, the Netherlands	Scheepswerf De Delft	Batavian Republic		1783	Battle of Camperdown	Sank 1797	Construction stopped after bankruptcy. Partially completed hull now in Scheemda
Bounty	Armed Transport	1) Greenport, New York, 2) Discovery Bay, Hong Kong		United Kingdom		1787	Mutiny 1789	Burned 1790	Foundered in Hurricane Sandy
Maryland Federalist	Miniature square rigger	Maryland State House, Annapolis, US	Maryland State Archives	United States		1788	Original vessel presented as a gift to George Washington	Original vessel sunk in a storm in the Potomac River in 1788	
Étoile du Roy	Frigate	Saint-Malo, France		United Kingdom		c.1790			Generic Nelson age war ship replica used in Hornblower
Friendship of Salem	East Indiaman	Salem, Massachusetts USA	Salem Maritime National Historic Site	United States		1797		Captured in the War of 1812 and condemned as a prize of war.	
Lady Nelson	Brig	Tasmania, Australia		United Kingdom		1799	Explored Australian coastline	Captured by pirates 1825	
Presviata Pokrova	Chaika			Ukraine		c.17th–18th centuries	Dnieper and Black Sea naval and trading vessel.		Type replica
Lynx	Schooner	Newport Beach, US		United States		c.1810	Blockade runner	Captured 1813	
Fame	Schooner	Salem, Massachusetts US	Salem Maritime National Historic Site	United States		c.1812	Blockade runner	Wrecked 1814	
Pride of Baltimore II	Topsail Schooner	Baltimore, Maryland, US		United States		c.1812	Blockade runner		Type replica
USS Niagara	Brig	Erie, Pennsylvania, US	Erie Maritime Museum	United States		1813	Battle of Lake Erie	Sunk for preservation 1820, rebuilt three times since	Sail training vessel and museum
HMS Buffalo	Store ship later convict ship	Gleneig, Adelaide, Australia		United Kingdom		1813	Carried the first Governor and 179 colonists to South Australia	Wrecked in a gale in 1840	Used as a floating restaurant
Goleta Ancud	Schooner	Punta Arenas, Chile	Nao Victoria Museum	Chile		1843	Claim the Strait of Magellan on behalf of the Chilean independent government	Uncertain discommission, displayed at Nao Victoria Museum	
Freedom Schooner Amistad	Schooner	New Haven, US		Spain	private owner	c.1825	Involved in the Amistad revolt, 1839	Unknown after 1844	
Enterprize	Schooner	Melbourne, Australia	Enterprize Trust, Melbourne	Australia		1829	Transported European settlers to Melbourne		Replica of Australian built ship. Charters, School Trips, daysails
William the Fourth	Steam Paddle Wheeler	Newcastle, NSW, Australia	Newcastle City Council	Australia		1831	Oceangoing steam-powered side paddlewheeler		Replica of Australian built ship
Pilgrim	Brig	Dana Point, US	Ocean Institute	United States	Private owner	1825	1834 memoir by Richard Henry Dana Jr.	Burned at sea 1856	Used in Amistad movie
Dunbrody	Barque	New Ross, Ireland		Canada	Private owner	1845	Famine Ship	Grounded 1875, Labrador	A Famine History museum
Jeanie Johnston	Barque	Dublin, Ireland	Dublin Docklands Development Authority	Canada		1847	Famine Ship		Sail Training vessel, a Famine History Museum and a Corporate Entertainment venue
Californian	Schooner	San Diego, USA		United States			Patrolled California coast c.1850		Based on C.W. Lawrence
Bluenose II	Schooner	Lunenburg, Canada		Canada		1921	Winning Racing Schooner	Grounded 1946	Fundraising for Bluenose III
New Belgica	Barque	Noeveren, Belgium		Belgium		1884	Belgian Antarctic Expedition	Scuttled when the Franco-British Expeditionary Force evacuated from Harstad in 1940	
Friends Good Will	Type	Current port^{a}	Michigan Maritime Museum	Country	Original affiliation	Original built	Notable for	End	Remark

^a If more than one replica is made the home port of the different current ports are given in a numbered list

=== Austronesia ===
Ship name	Type	Current port^{a}	Current affiliation	Country	Original affiliation	Original built	Notable for	End	Remark
Balatik	Paraw	El Nido, Philippines	Tao Philippines	Philippines			Replica of a large trimaran paraw completed in 2014. Currently used for island-hopping tours from El Nido to Coron, Palawan by the Tao Philippines organization.		
Diwata ng Lahi	Balangay	Manila, Philippines	National Museum of the Philippines	Philippines	Kaya ng Pinoy Foundation	c.689 - 988 CE	One of several replicas of Austronesian lashed-lug plank boats from Butuan. Sailed throughout Southeast Asia in 2009 along with Masawa Hong Butuan and Sama Tawi-Tawi.		On permanent display
Lahi ng Maharlika	Balangay	Manila, Philippines	Kaya ng Pinoy Foundation	Philippines		c.689 - 988 CE	One of several replicas of Austronesian lashed-lug plank boats from Butuan		
Masawa Hong Butuan	Balangay	Manila, Philippines	Kaya ng Pinoy Foundation	Philippines		c.689 - 988 CE	One of several replicas of Austronesian lashed-lug plank boats from Butuan. Sailed throughout Southeast Asia in 2009 along with Diwata ng Lahi and Sama Tawi-Tawi.		
Sama Tawi-Tawi	Balangay	Manila, Philippines	Kaya ng Pinoy Foundation	Philippines		c.689 - 988 CE	One of several replicas of Austronesian lashed-lug plank boats from Butuan. Sailed throughout Southeast Asia in 2009 along with Diwata ng Lahi and Masawa Hong Butuan.		
Sarimanok	Vinta	Bali, Indonesia	Oceanographic Research Museum	Philippines		?	Sailed in 1985 from Bali to Madagascar across the Indian Ocean to replicate ancient seafaring techniques		
Sultan sin Sulu	Balangay	Manila, Philippines	Kaya ng Pinoy Foundation	Philippines		c.689 - 988 CE	One of several replicas of Austronesian lashed-lug plank boats from Butuan		
Raya Kolambu	Balangay	Butuan, Philippines	Balangay Sailing Association	Philippines		c.689 - 988 CE	One of several replicas of Austronesian lashed-lug plank boats from Butuan Sailed from San Vicente, Palawan to Lapu-Lapu City, Cebu, in 2019 for the quincentennial celebration of the Battle of Mactan, before arriving in Butuan.		
Raya Siyagu	Balangay	Butuan, Philippines	Balangay Sailing Association	Philippines		c.689 - 988 CE	One of several replicas of Austronesian lashed-lug plank boats from Butuan Sailed from San Vicente, Palawan to Lapu-Lapu City, Cebu, in 2019 for the quincentennial celebration of the Battle of Mactan, before arriving in Butuan.		
Alfred Wallace	Kalulis	Indonesia	Tim Severin	Indonesia			A replica of built by the British explorer Tim Severin and sailed in the Indonesian archipelago as chronicled in his book The Spice Islands Voyage (1997)		
Hati Marege	Padewakang	Indonesia	Museum and Art Gallery of the Northern Territory	Indonesia			A replica of a vessel used by Sulawesian to catch teripang in Australian coast, 16-20th century		
Samudra Raksa	Borobudur ship	Indonesia	Samudra Raksa Museum 7°36′16.89″S 110°12′12.2″E	Indonesia		c.8th century	A replica of one of the ships carved in Borobudur, launched in a 2003 to 2004 expedition from Jakarta to Accra, Ghana		
Spirit of Majapahit	Borobudur ship	Indonesia	Japan Majapahit Association	Indonesia		c.13th century	A replica of a sailing vessel from the Majapahit Kingdom. It sailed from Jakarta to Pontianak, Brunei Darussalam, Manila, Taipei, and Tokyo in 2016		
Saina	Sakman	Guam		United States			The first modern replica of a Chamorro sakman ("flying proa") built between 2007 and 2008		
Alingano Maisu	Waʻa kaulua	Kawaihae, Hawaii		United States			A double-hulled voyaging canoe built in Kawaihae, Hawaii by members of Na Kalai Waʻa Moku o Hawaiʻi and ʻOhana Wa'a members from throughout the Pacific and abroad as a gift and tribute to Satawalese navigator Mau Piailug		
Hōkūleʻa	Waʻa kaulua	Honolulu, Hawaii	Polynesian Voyaging Society	United States			A performance-accurate waʻa kaulua, a Polynesian double-hulled voyaging canoe. Launched on 8 March 1975 by the Polynesian Voyaging Society, she is best known for her 1976 Hawaiʻi to Tahiti voyage completed with exclusively Polynesian navigation techniques.		
Hawaiʻiloa	Waʻa kaulua	Honolulu, Hawaii	Polynesian Voyaging Society	United States					
Hikianalia	Waʻa kaulua	Hawaii	Polynesian Voyaging Society	United States					
Hokualakai	Waʻa kaulua	Hilo, Hawaii		United States					
Makali'i	Waʻa kaulua	Kawaihae, Hawaii		United States					
Iosepa	Waʻa kaulua	Honolulu, Hawaii		United States					
Maire Nui	Vaka katea	Rarotonga, Cook Islands		Cook Islands					
Marumaru Atua	Vaka katea	Rarotonga, Cook Islands		Cook Islands					
Naga Pelangi	Pinas	Kuala Terengganu, Malaysia		Malaysia			Naga Pelangi (meaning "rainbow dragon") is a wooden junk rigged schooner of the Malay pinas type built from 2004 to 2009 in Kuala Terengganu, Malaysia. Finished in 2010, it is operated as a charter vessel in South East Asia. It is built entirely using traditional Austronesian lashed-lug techniques.		
Tākitimu	Vaka katea	Rarotonga, Cook Islands		Cook Islands					
Te Au O Tonga	Vaka katea	Rarotonga, Cook Islands		Cook Islands					
Faʻafaite i te Ao Māʻohi	Pahi	Tahiti, French Polynesia		French Polynesia					
Tahiti Nui	Pahi	Tahiti, French Polynesia		French Polynesia					
Aotearoa One	Waka hourua	Auckland, New Zealand		New Zealand					
Haunui	Waka hourua	Auckland, New Zealand		New Zealand					
Ngahiraka Mai Tawhiti	Waka hourua	Auckland, New Zealand		New Zealand					
Pūmaiterangi	Waka hourua	Auckland, New Zealand		New Zealand					
Te Aurere	Waka hourua	Auckland, New Zealand		New Zealand					

=== East Asia ===
- Kanrin Maru; Minami Awaji harbour, Japan; a double-size replica of a Japanese warship
- Namihaya; Osaka Maritime Museum, Japan; 5th-century Japanese ship replica
- Naniwa Maru; Osaka Maritime Museum, Japan; Edo period merchant ship
- San Juan Bautista; Ishinomaki, Japan; a Japanese warship
- Turtle ship; a generic replica of a Korean ship
- Michinoku Maru; Michinoku Traditional Wooden Boat Museum, Japan; 18th-century Japanese trade ship (Kitamae Bune) replica
- Princess Taiping; a replica of a Ming Dynasty Chinese junk.
- Replica (stationary, not seaworthy) of a Chinese treasure ship, in the Treasure Boat Shipyard Park, Nanjing
- Dingyuan; a replica of an Imperial Chinese ironclad from the late 19th century

== Other vessels ==
- SS Bandırma; Turkish passenger cargo vessel
- Jewel of Muscat; Omani 9th-century sailing ship built to retrace the route of the original ship from Oman to Singapore.
- INSV Kaundinya; Replica of 5th century Indian sailing ships
- Ictineu II; Barcelona, Spain; a replica of the first mechanically powered steam driven submarine.
- The Hjortspring Boat is replica of a Danish Iron Age rowing boat.
- At the Viking Ship Museum in Roskilde, replicas of Viking ships are built.
- Various projects for building replicas of the ill-fated RMS Titanic have been proposed over the years. The first Titanic replica to actually commence construction is being built by Chinese firm Seven Star Energy Investment; by summer 2021, the hull is essentially complete and construction of the superstructure is beginning. The ship will not sail on any ocean, but be permanently docked on a river in Sichuan province to function as the main attraction for the Romandisea Seven Star International Cultural Tourism Resort.
- Various "replicas" of Noah's Ark have been built. Whether they are properly regarded as "replicas" depends on whether one takes the Biblical flood story as mythology or fact. Since the Biblical description of the vessel is very brief beyond the basic measures, the exact design of any "replica" is necessarily conjectural.

== See also ==
- Barcelona Charter
- Experimental archaeology
- List of museum ships
- Museum ship
- Replica
- Ship of Theseus
- Tim Severin - Recreating ancient voyages
- Viking ship replica
