= Replica Titanic =

Reconstruction of British ocean liner

There have been several proposals and studies for a project to build a replica ship based on the infamous British ocean liner, RMS Titanic. A project by South African businessman Sarel Gous was abandoned in 2006, and a project by Australian businessman and former politician Clive Palmer was announced in 2012, known as the Titanic II. While Palmer has made no official announcement about his project being abandoned, it appears to have seen a dramatically decreased amount of progress by 2015 and no construction. A Titanic replica to be permanently docked at an inland resort in Sichuan, China commenced construction in May 2015. The Titanic Museums in Branson, Missouri and Pigeon Forge, Tennessee are designed to depict the forward half of the Titanic.

== Economic viability of a recreation ==
In 1998, Popular Mechanics magazine explored the feasibility of such projects, in consultation with Neil Gallagher of the Webb Institute. The article discussed the significant changes to the original design required to produce a safe and economically viable ship. Most of the changes would appear below the water line:

- Welded, not riveted, hull
- Bulbous bow for greater fuel efficiency
- Enlarged rudder and bow thrusters for increased maneuverability
- Horizontal stabilizers
- Diesel electric generation or modern smaller compact oil fired water tube boilers and geared steam turbines propulsion would either partially or fully free up the cavernous space used by Titanic's 159 coal furnaces and 29 boilers
- Vacated space could be used for waste processing, water treatment, and air conditioning.

Extra funnels not needed for diesel generator exhaust would be dummy funnels. The economic feasibility was more uncertain. The engineering challenges would drive the construction costs to approximately twice the cost of a modern cruise ship.

== Sarel Gous project (1998–2006) ==
South African businessman mogul Sarel Gous proposed building Titanic II in 1998. Gous said he had got hold of the original drawings for the famous ship and now wanted to fulfill his dream. If the ship had been completed, she would have had a length of 290 metres and a width of 33 metres.

Gous originally considered constructing the ship in Durban, South Africa. Having commissioned a feasibility study into the project with Harland & Wolff shipyard in Belfast, he presented the proposal to Belfast City Council in June 2000. The project was priced at around £500 million. In November 2000, Gous signed an agreement with a Monaco-based firm to finance the construction of the ship. He stated that construction would begin at Harland & Wolff within the next nine months. The brand name of the company that would operate the Replica Titanic was to be the White Star Line, acting as a revival of the now defunct shipping line.

From the outset the intention was to build an exact copy but with enough lifeboats. Due to SOLAS regulations, this proved to be impossible to meet. Modern fire-prevention regulations prohibit the large-scale use of wood in the interior. It is also no longer legal to have lifeboats mounted as high as they were on Titanic. Standards now require that life boats be mounted no higher than 15 m (49 ft) above the waterline. A replica Titanic would require a height exemption similar to that granted the RMS Queen Mary 2.

In 2006 the Replica Titanic project was scrapped due to high costs and a low amount of support for the project. The last Titanic survivor, Millvina Dean, had expressed her opposition to the project.

== Clive Palmer project ==
On 30 April 2012, Australian billionaire Clive Palmer announced a project to build a near replica of the Titanic. Palmer established the company Blue Star Line to build and operate the ship. The maiden voyage was initially scheduled for 2016, later postponed to 2018. The ship would be as close as possible in design to the original Titanic, but underneath would be a ship of modern specifications with stabilisers, diesel electric propulsion (utilising Azimuth thrusts) and the health and safety features found onboard modern cruise vessels.

Marine engineering company Deltamarin was hired to design the ship.

According to the general arrangement published on 17 July 2012, the length of the replica was to be the same as that of the original ship, but it would be 4.2 metres (13 ft 9 in) wider and its draught would be smaller by 3 metres (9 ft 10 in). The lower deck cabins were to be "typical for a modern cruise vessel" while cabins and public rooms from D deck upwards would be "as in the original ship".

By March 2015, design work on the ship was on hold and it was unclear whether the project would proceed. During the first half of 2015 evidence accumulated strongly suggesting that the project had been abandoned. In March 2015 Deltamarin told an Australian Broadcasting Corporation journalist that work on the Titanic II project had been halted. Also in March it was reported that no work had begun or been ordered in the Chinese shipyard identified as the likely site of construction with workers highly skeptical that the project would ever move beyond the proposal stage. On 26 March 2015, the Blue Star Line trademark was listed as "abandoned".

In September 2015, a spokesman for Palmer said the project had merely been delayed, and that the ship would be launched in 2018. This did not happen, but on 27 September 2018 the Blue Star Line, in a press release on their official web site, announced that work on the project would recommence with a launch date in 2022.

On 13 March 2024, Palmer held a press conference to announce his revival of the Titanic II project. He anticipated that construction would begin in 2025, although a shipyard had yet to be selected.

== Romandisea Titanic ==
The first Titanic replica to actually commence construction was invested in by Chinese firm Seven Star Energy Investment and is being constructed by Wuchang Shipbuilding. The project was first reported by media in October 2013 and formally launched in January 2014. The ship will be the same size as the original Titanic.

The replica is intended as the main attraction and centrepiece to a resort in Sichuan, where it will be permanently docked on the river Daying Qi. The shipyard started making parts in May 2015, to be transported to the site of the projected theme park and assembled there. An on-site keel laying ceremony ensued in November 2016. Original plans to include an audiovisual simulation of the sinking were shelved after criticism to the effect that this would be in bad taste. In August 2016, a spokesman for the investor group stated that the replica would be assembled by the end of the year and would employ about 1000 workers. He also indicated that there will be "a special tourist route to the assembly site for people to witness the revival of the luxury liner".

Wuchang Shipbuilding Industry Group Co., Ltd has confirmed the replica Titanic will be a tourist attraction and that will cost approximately US$161 million to build. The ship will include many features of the original, including a ballroom, dining hall, theatre, first-class cabins, economy cabins and swimming pool. The original ship's Grand Staircase will also be remade. Due to it functioning as a floating hotel in a resort, rooms will be available to stay in inside the Titanic.

Seven Star CEO Su Shaojun at one point indicated that the replica was expected to be completed around the end of 2017. By mid-2020, most of the hull had been constructed but the superstructure had yet to be assembled.
