= Mineralogy v Western Australia =

High Court challenge over compensation for previously denied mining rights

- Court: High Court of Australia
- Full case name: Mineralogy Pty Ltd & Anor v. State of Western Australia
- Decided: 13 October 2021
- Citation: [2021] HCA 30
- Transcripts: 15 Jun 2021 [2021] HCATrans 104; 16 Jun 2021 [2021] HCATrans 106; 17 Jun 2021 [2021] HCATrans 107; 18 Jun 2021 [2021] HCATrans 108

Court membership
- Judges sitting: Kiefel CJ, Gageler, Keane, Gordon, Edelman, Steward, Glesson JJ

Case opinions
- The Iron Ore Processing (Mineralogy Pty Ltd) Agreement Amendment Act 2020 is not invalid or inoperative in its entirety

Mineralogy v Western Australia was a case heard by the High Court of Australia at the same time as Palmer v Western Australia in 2020 and 2021, which held that the Iron Ore Processing (Mineralogy Pty Ltd) Agreement Amendment Act 2020 was not invalid or inoperative in its entirety.

== Background ==
In 2002, the Western Australian government and Clive Palmer entered into an agreement—the Iron Ore Processing (Mineralogy Pty Ltd) Agreement Act 2002, as permitted under the Government Agreements Act 1979—which established the mining rights of Palmer and seven of his companies in Western Australia. In 2012, the WA government declined to assess Mineralogy's Balmoral South iron ore mining proposal. Arbitration decisions in 2014 and 2018 were favourable to Palmer and Mineralogy, with the company initiating a third arbitration in July 2020 in which it claimed up to $30 billion in damages stemming from the WA Government's decision not to approve the Balmoral South proposal. In response to the claim, which the Premier Mark McGowan said would be equivalent to "every man, woman, and child in the state owing $12,000 each" or the entire annual state budget, the WA introduced passed emergency legislation to block it.

The Iron Ore Processing (Mineralogy Pty Ltd) Agreement Amendment Act 2020 was passed on 13 August 2020 by the Upper House of the WA parliament after being argued for ten hours, with royal assent given by WA Governor Kim Beazley at 10.30pm. Shortly after it passed, Palmer said that he would take WA to the High Court.

Writs of summons were issued on 14 September 2020 and 18 September 2020 for Palmer v Western Australia and Mineralogy v Western Australia respectively. At a hearing on 30 September 2020 before Kiefel CJ, it was decided that they were to be heard together, as they had "so many common issues".

== Decision ==
The High Court's unanimous decision was handed down on 13 October 2021, with its reasons published the same day. The court found that the Iron Ore Processing (Mineralogy Pty Ltd) Agreement Amendment Act 2020 was not invalid or inoperative in its entirety, and that sections 9(1), 9(2), and 10(4-7) were not invalid or inoperative to any extent. Sub-questions answered by the court, each of which were answered "No", were:

First, did the manner of enactment of the Amending Act contravene s 6 of the Australia Act 1986 (Cth)? Second, did the Amending Act exceed some limitation on the legislative power of the Parliament of Western Australia arising from the rule of law or deeply rooted common law rights? Third, were ss 9(1), 9(2) and 10(4)-(7) of the State Act invalid on the basis that they were incompatible with Ch III of the Constitution? Fourth, were the same provisions invalid on the basis that they were incompatible with s 118 of the Constitution? Fifth, did the Amending Act single out Mr Palmer for a "disability" or "discrimination" of a kind forbidden by s 117 of the Constitution?

== Consequences ==
As a result of the court's decision, the Iron Ore Processing (Mineralogy Pty Ltd) Agreement Amendment Act 2020 continued in force, with WA shielded from the $28 billion damages claim. Premier McGowan said on Facebook that "Time and time again, Clive Palmer has attempted to bring our state down — first, by challenging the hard border that kept Western Australians safe through a pandemic, and then by launching an outrageous legal claim for damages", and "Today's win is proof that our government will never stop fighting for the people of Western Australia." McGowan also said that had the claim for damages been upheld, it would have bankrupted WA. Attorney-General John Quigley called the claim for damages "ridiculous" and that the legislation passed was to "stop this greedy grab for Western Australia's money which would have been doubling our debt". Palmer and Mineralogy were required to pay costs, which according to Quigley were $2 million on top of $1 million already incurred over the High Court challenge to the WA hard border in response to the COVID-19 pandemic.

McGowan labelled Palmer an "enemy of the state".

== See also ==
- Palmer v Western Australia – High Court challenge over the WA hard border
