= Tianbao =

Tianbao may refer to:

- Sanggyai Yexe (1917–2008), also known as Tian Bao, Tibetan official of the People's Republic of China

== Places in China ==
=== Towns ===
- Tianbao, Fujian (天宝), in Zhangzhou, Fujian
- Tianbao, Shandong (天宝), in Xintai, Shandong
- Tianbao, Daying County (天保), in Daying County, Sichuan
- Tianbao, Yunnan (天保), in Malipo County, Yunnan

=== Townships ===
- Tianbao Township, Hubei (天宝乡), in Zhuxi County, Hubei
- Tianbao Township, Jiangxi (天宝乡), in Yifeng County, Jiangxi
- Tianbao Township, Xuanhan County (天宝乡), in Xuanhan County, Sichuan
- Tianbao Township, Anyue County (天宝乡), in Anyue County, Sichuan

== Historical eras ==
- Tianbao (天保, 550–559), era name used by Emperor Wenxuan of Northern Qi
- Tianbao (天保, 562–585), era name used by Emperor Ming of Western Liang
- Tianbao (天寶, 742–756), era name used by Emperor Xuanzong of Tang
- Tianbao (天寶, 908–912), era name used by Qian Liu, king of Wuyue
