= Palmer v Western Australia =

High Court challenge over WA hard border

- Court: High Court of Australia
- Full case name: Palmer & Anor v. The State of Western Australia & Anor
- Decided: 6 November 2020
- Citation: [2021] HCA 5
- Transcripts: 3 Nov [2020] HCATrans 178; 4 Nov [2020] HCATrans 179; 6 Nov [2020] HCATrans 180

Court membership
- Judges sitting: Kiefel CJ, Gageler, Keane, Gordon, Edelman JJ

Case opinions
- The Quarantine (Closing the Border) Directions comply with s 92 of the Constitution

Palmer v Western Australia was a case heard by the High Court of Australia during the COVID-19 pandemic, which held that the Quarantine (Closing the Border) Directions and the authorising legislation, the Emergency Management Act 2005, were not impermissibly infringing section 92 of the Constitution of Australia.

== Background ==
On 15 March 2020, the Minister for Emergency Services declared a state of emergency in Western Australia, due to the COVID-19 pandemic. The following day, a Public Health State of Emergency was declared by the Minister for Health. Following the declarations, the Quarantine (Closing the Border) Directions ('Directions') were given by the commissioner of police and the state emergency coordinator, closing the Western Australian border to all non-essential travellers from 5 April 2020. These directions were continually extended until the Western Australian border reopened on 3 March 2022.

In mid-May 2020, Clive Palmer was refused entry into Western Australia, under the Directions. On 25 May 2020, Palmer commenced proceedings against Western Australia in the High Court, on the basis that the Directions and the authorising legislation impermissibly infringed section 92 of the Constitution. Section 92 concerns "trade, commerce, and intercourse among the States", which shall be "absolutely free".

== Decision ==
The High Court's decision was handed down on 6 November 2020, with its reasons published on 24 February 2021. The court found that the sections of the authorising legislation for the Directions—sections 55 and 67 of the Emergency Management Act 2005—did not impermissibly infringe section 92 of the Constitution in "their application to an emergency constituted by the occurrence of a hazard in the nature of a plague or epidemic". The judgment went on to state that "the exercise of power given by those provisions to make paras 4 and 5 of the Quarantine (Closing the Border) Directions (WA) does not raise a constitutional question", and that costs were to be paid by the plaintiffs.

== Consequences ==
As a result of the unsuccessful challenge to the hard border, the Directions and the hard border remained in effect. Border control measures were eased from 14 November, with some travellers from "very low risk" jurisdictions permitted to enter Western Australia without an exemption.

Due to comments made by Premier Mark McGowan and Palmer towards each other over the border challenge, each sued the other, with $5,000 and $20,000 awarded to Palmer and McGowan respectively.

== See also ==
- Mineralogy v Western Australia – High Court case brought by Palmer against WA over a mining compensation claim
