= Balmoral South mine =

Proposed iron mine located in western Australia

- Location in Australia

Location
- Location: Pilbara, Western Australia, Australia; 21°07′47″S 116°07′39″E

Production
- Products: Iron ore

The Balmoral South mine was a proposed large iron ore located in the Pilbara region of Western Australia. Balmoral South represents one of the largest iron ore reserves in Australia and the world, having estimated reserves of 859 million tonnes of ore grading 22.6% MagFe and 31.2% Fe. It is currently owned by Clive Palmer's company Mineralogy.

The mine never went ahead and was the subject of a legal dispute between Palmer and the Government of Western Australia, the latter being sued for AUS$27.7 Billion. Later on, the WA Government passed legislation to defend itself which Palmer unsuccessfully challenged.

On 30 March 2023, Palmer initiated legal action against the Commonwealth of Australia to seek $300 billion in damages.
