= Romandisea Titanic =

Partially-built replica of the Titanic

- A computer graphic of the replica ship

History
- Name: Titanic
- Namesake: RMS Titanic
- Builder: Wuchang Shipbuilding Industry Group Co., Ltd
- Cost: ~US $161 million
- Laid down: 30 November 2016
- Status: Unknown

General characteristics
- Type: Replica of Olympic-class ocean liner
- Tonnage: 46328GRT
- Length: 882.5 ft (269 m)
- Beam: 91.8 ft (28 m)
- Height: 175ft (53 m, funnels included)
- Draught: 34 ft 7 in (10.5 m)
- Decks: 9
- Speed: Zero (static replica)

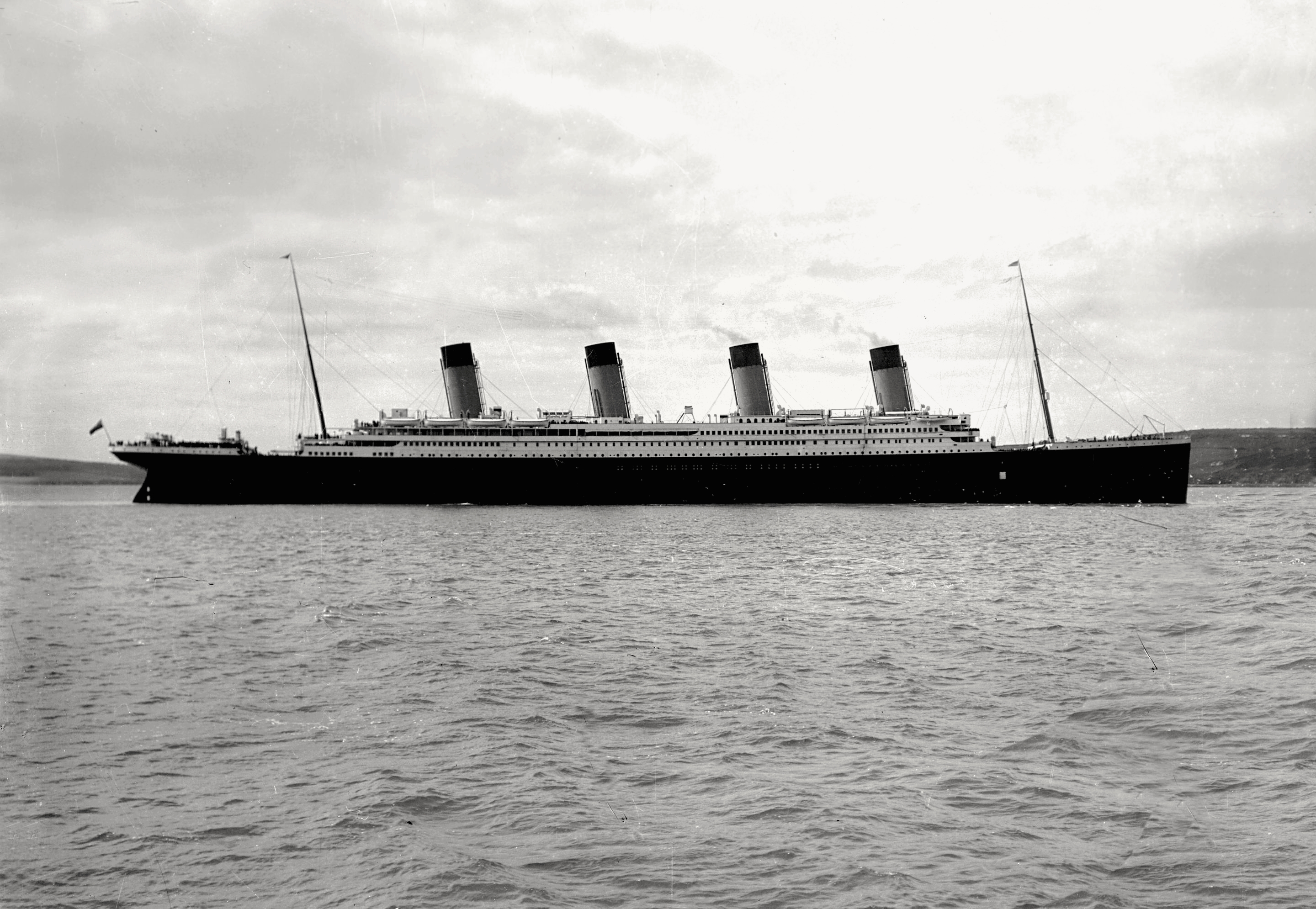
The original RMS Titanic

The Romandisea Titanic is a partially-built full-scale replica of the RMS Titanic, that is located in landlocked Sichuan province, China. The project was first reported in October 2013 and formally launched in January 2014. The ship was to be the same size as the original Olympic-class ocean liner Titanic. The replica vessel was anticipated to be the centerpiece of the Romandisea resort and would have included overnight hotel accommodations. It was to be permanently docked in a reservoir on the Qijiang River, a tributary of the Fu River, at coordinates 30.6282°N 105.2220°E in Sichuan's rural Daying County.

== Background ==
In 1912, the original Titanic set out on its maiden and only voyage from Southampton in the United Kingdom to New York City. Five days into the voyage, the ship hit an iceberg and sank, killing approximately 1,500 of the 2,224 aboard. Titanic was the largest ship of its time.

=== Prior ventures ===
South African businessman mogul Sarel Gous proposed building Titanic II in 1998. Gous said he had acquired the original drawings for the famous ship and now wanted to fulfill his dream. If the ship had been completed, it would have had a length of 290 metres (950 ft) and a width of 33 metres (108 ft), which is 21 metres (69 ft) longer and 5 metres (16 ft) metres wider than the original. In 2006, the project was scrapped due to high costs and a low amount of support for the project. The last Titanic survivor to pass away, Millvina Dean, had expressed her opposition to the project.

Another replica ship based on the Titanic was announced and planned by Australian millionaire Clive Palmer, also named as the Titanic II. The intended launch date was originally set in 2016, then delayed to 2018, to 2022, and then 2027.

=== Chinese venture ===
James Cameron's 1997 Titanic movie enjoys great and lasting popularity in China, and introduced the Chinese masses to the Titanic story. Actor Bernard Hill, who portrayed Captain Edward Smith in Cameron's film, was present at the launch of the project and was named the "honorary captain" of the vessel to be constructed. Hill later regretted having a role in the project. The investors behind the Sichuan replica sought to approach the sinking of the Titanic primarily as a story of heroic self-sacrifice. The CEO of the investment group involved elaborated on the "Titanic spirit", saying:

"People have never forgotten how at that time people sacrificed their lives to carry out their responsibilities, with men protecting the women and children and couples side by side in life and death. That is the Titanic spirit of responsibility and universal love...Romandisea will therefore become a world-class tourist destination with a noble soul and spiritual pursuit."

== Design and construction ==
Wuchang Shipbuilding Industry Group Co., Ltd stated the replica Titanic would be a tourist attraction and that would cost approximately US$161 million to build. The ship was to include many features of the original, including dining rooms, first-class cabins, second and third class cabins, Victorian-style Turkish baths, gymnasium and a swimming pool, as well as a replica of the original ship's engine. New features included a ballroom and theatre. The original ship's Grand Staircase was also to be remade. The ship was expected to accommodate 2,400 passengers and 900 staff and was also to house an interactive museum.

On December 23, 2017, the Facebook page for the project indicated that boiler room 1 would be replicated.

Using audiovisual technology, the ship was at one point intended to contain a simulation of the original's collision with an iceberg that led to the original ocean liner sinking. This caused some criticism. Hollywood production designer Curtis Schnell, who was hired in to work on the project, stated that the 1912 tragedy is approached in a "very respectful way". The simulation was ultimately abandoned.

Regarding the replica ship's authenticity, Schnell stated:

"We're trying to get as close as we can. We are not building every room in the [original] ship, by any means, but the shell of the ship and the exteriors will be quite accurate, [and] there will be interior rooms to be able to tour and see from the standpoint of historical accuracy."

Xinhua News Agency reported that it took two years to design the new vessel with cooperation from an American firm, and that the blueprints of the original ships were obtained for the purpose of designing the new ship.

Construction was based on the design of the original Titanic, and assisted by designers and technicians from the United States and Britain.

Construction of the replica was being funded by Seven Star Energy Investment, a private company based in Sichuan province. Prior to the commencement of building this ship, none of the numerous proposed full-size replica ships of the Titanic ever made it to the beginning of construction. In May 2015, Wuchang started making parts for the vessel. A keel laying ceremony at the site of the planned resort occurred at the end of November 2016, with Lord Peter Mandelson attending. In December 2016 the developer signed a cooperation agreement with National Geographic to document the construction of the vessel.

== Project status ==
Su Shaojun, CEO of the investment group, initially indicated that the replica was expected to be completed around the end of 2017. However the start of on-site assembly was delayed over a year. In 2018 NPR reported that the project might be experiencing financial problems while aerial images captured between April and October of that year showed no visible changes in the ship's construction status.

On December 10, 2018, Romandisea stated that construction work had resumed. In March 2021, the project posted images of welding fabrication on the eighth deck. In August, a report emerged that construction had again halted. It was reported that the replica vessel was "covered with rust", as multiple news outlets report that the project has stalled. Local officials, when questioned on the construction of the vessel, replied that the project is "still in progress". Another report later described the ship as only about 25% complete. In September 2022, a London-based financial site attempted to contact Romandisea but received no response. As of January 2026, the project's official website was offline. A web archive image captured in October 2021 shows that no updates had been made since July of that year. The official Romandisea Titanic X profile page @RomandiseaT2, which occasionally posted updates and progress on the replica's construction, was also suspended.
