= Mineralogy (mining company) =

Australian mining company

- Type: Private
- Industry: Mining
- Founded: 1984
- Founder: Clive Palmer
- Headquarters: Australia
- Products: Iron ore
- Net income: ▲ A$354 million (2018 Audited)
- Total assets: ▲ A$594 million (2018 Audited)
- Total equity: A$451 million (2018 Audited)
- Owner: Clive Palmer
- Subsidiaries: Waratah Coal
- Website: www.mineralogy.com.au

Mineralogy is an Australian mining company owned by Clive Palmer. The company is involved in mining exploration and development, principally iron ore, in Western Australia. Mineralogy had assets of A$594 million in 2018. It entered a US$415 million arrangement with the Chinese company CITIC in 2006. Mineralogy and CITIC have been in legal disputes over royalties and other matters since 2013.

== History ==
Mineralogy was founded in 1984 by Clive Palmer, who had become wealthy through property development in the Gold Coast. In 1985, the company acquired exploration leases for magnetite tenements in Cape Preston, Pilbara, from the U.S. iron ore processor M. A. Hanna Company. Palmer transferred the tenement's soon-to-expire exploration rights to his Queensland property company, GSS Homes.

In 2006, it signed a deal with the Chinese infrastructure company CITIC Pacific to develop a small portion of a large iron ore deposit in the Pilbara region of Western Australia. The agreement involved the development of two magnetite mines and construction of port infrastructure at Cape Preston. According to Palmer the company owns more than 1,000 square kilometres (390 sq mi) of land in the region. Mineralogy was paid US$415 million for the rights to mine the ore. According to Palmer the reserves contain 160 billion tonnes of iron ore.

In 2009, Mineralogy acquired the Australian coal mining company Waratah Coal. By 2012, Mineralogy acquired the rights to thermal coal deposits situated in the Galilee Basin. Estimates of the size of the deposits reach 100 billion tonnes of coal.

Mineralogy has been in a long-running legal dispute with CITIC Limited's (formerly CITIC Pacific Limited) Australian subsidiary companies that are exploiting the magnetite mine in the Pilbara region of Western Australia. In 2013 Mineralogy commenced legal proceedings to resolve a dispute about royalties it claimed to be due to it, which in 2017 the Western Australian Supreme Court delivered judgement in favour of Mineralogy. The CITIC parties appealed the decision of the trial judge to the Court of Appeal, but lost.

The outcome of the proceedings above is that Mineralogy received US$350 million with ongoing royalties of US$ 200 million annually. As at 30 June 2018, Mineralogy had consolidated Net Asset Position reported at a value of AUD $451 million (audited).

On 27 September 2018, Clive Palmer also confirmed that as a result of the wins in the Western Australian Courts and the subsequent payments of royalties to Mineralogy, work has re-commenced by Mineralogy subsidiary Blue Star Line to build the ocean liner Titanic II. The ship was forecast to set sail in 2022, and to follow the original route of the Titanic.

Mineralogy took Western Australia to the High Court over the Iron Ore Processing (Mineralogy Pty Ltd) Agreement Amendment Act 2022 in Mineralogy v Western Australia, but lost.

As of 2023, Mineralogy has ten exploration and prospecting permits in New Zealand, spanning over 306,000 ha (760,000 acres), over 93,000 ha (230,000 acres) of which overlap with conservation land, including near Lake Brunner.

== Political donations ==
Clive Palmer established the United Australia Party in 2013. In 2022, Mineralogy donated $116 million to the United Australia Party, which won a single seat in the upper house in the 2022 federal election.

== See also ==
- Mining in Australia
- Mining in Western Australia
