= Maryland Federalist =

Coordinates: 39.18034°N 76.66796°W

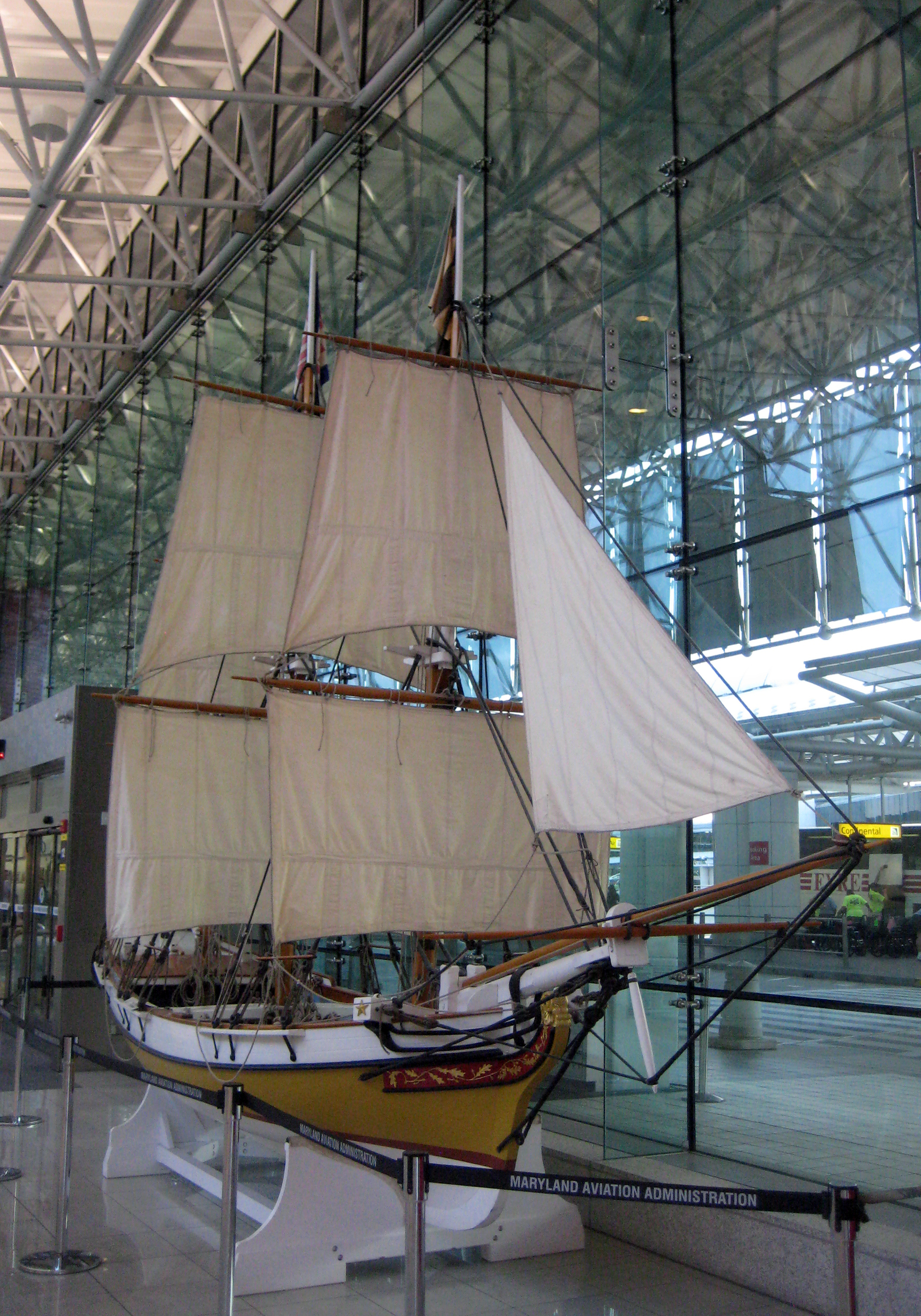
- The Maryland Federalist at BWI Airport, June 25, 2011.

History

Maryland
- Name: Maryland Federalist
- Owner: Maryland State Archives
- Builder: Allen C. Rawl
- Laid down: 1987
- Status: Displayed at BWI Airport or Maryland State House

General characteristics
- Length: 15 ft (4.6 m)
- Beam: 5 ft (1.5 m)
- Sail plan: Square rig (7 sails on three masts; 132 sq ft (12.3 m^{2}) of sail area)

Maryland Federalist is a 15-foot (4.6 m) replica ship built in 1987 and now located at BWI Airport near Concourse D. The ship is a replica of the miniature ship Federalist which was built in 1788.

== Original Federalist ==
The merchants of Baltimore celebrated Maryland's ratification of the United States Constitution on April 28, 1788, by building a 15-foot (4.6 m) miniature ship called Federalist. The ship was designed by Joshua Barney, a native of Baltimore and commodore in the United States Navy. Federalist was the centerpiece of a parade in Baltimore before being sailed by Barney down the Chesapeake Bay and up the Potomac River to Mount Vernon to be presented as a gift to George Washington. According to Washington's diary, Barney arrived on June 8, 1788. Federalist sank in a "hurricane" on July 24.

In April 2010, a partnership between the Mount Vernon Archaeology Department, the Lighthouse Archaeological Maritime Program, the Institute of Maritime History, the Maryland Historical Trust, and the Virginia Department of Historic Resources conducted an archaeological survey of the Potomac River near Mount Vernon. One of the project's goals was to locate the Federalist wreck. In October 2010, it was reported that the surveyors "... found sonar signals that may indicate that a boat of the Federalist['s] size is present." Subsequent field work in 2013 did not find anything related to Federalist.

== Modern Maryland Federalist ==
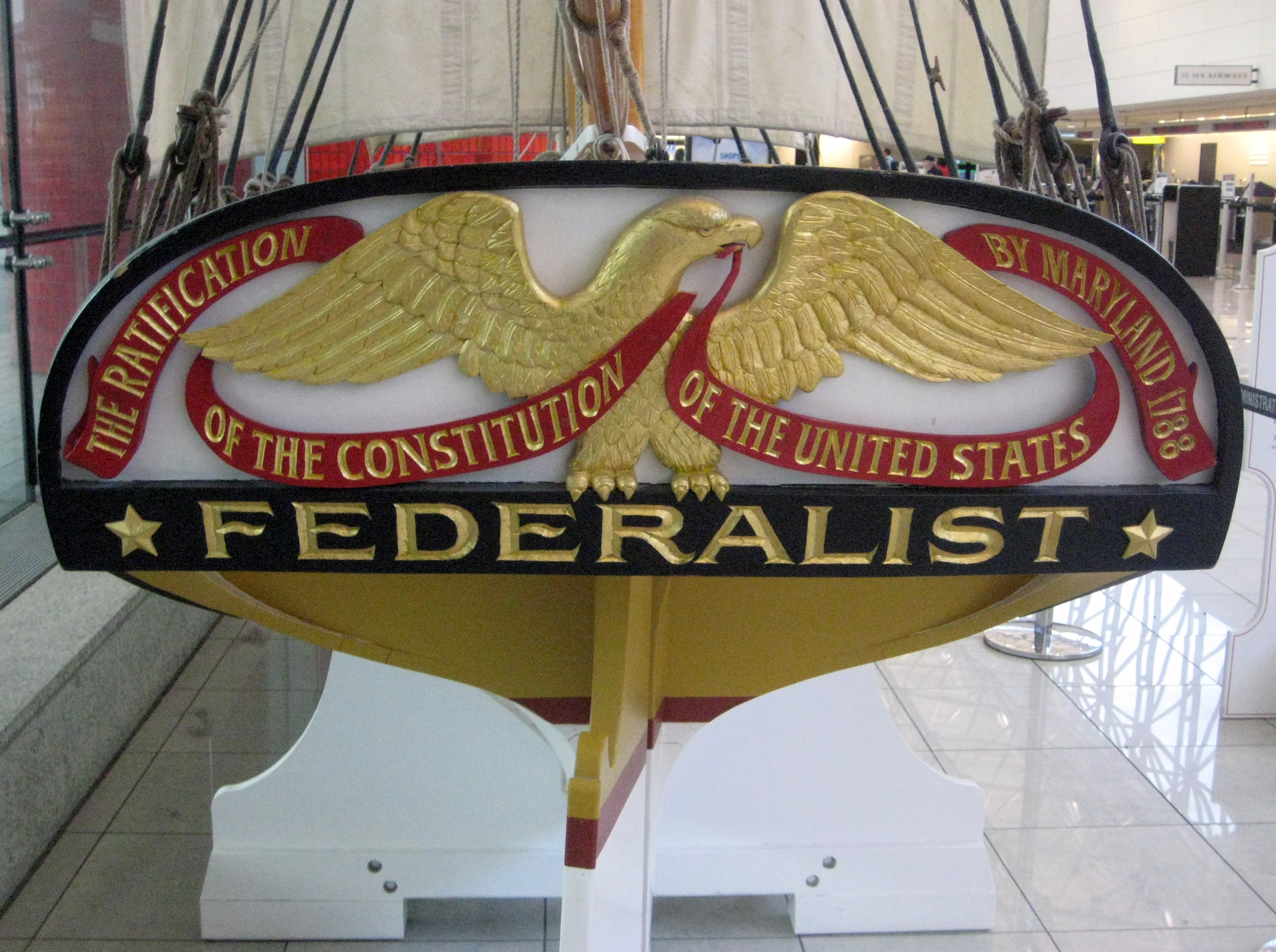
Maryland Federalist's carved stern features a gilded eagle.

Maryland Federalist was built with private funds raised by the Maryland Federalist Foundation. She was designed by Melbourne Smith and built by Allen C. Rawl. According to her builder, she was "built as a full scale historic representation of the original vessel [Federalist] from written documentation and notes that describe the original small ship designed and built by ... Joshua Barney in 1787 [i.e., 1788]." The ship is rigged with seven sails to commemorate Maryland's place as the seventh state to ratify the United States Constitution. She is painted in the colors of the flag of Maryland (red, white, black, and gold) and decorated with other state symbols. The Maryland Federalist Foundation gave the ship to the Maryland State Archives on July 1, 1988, and she is displayed at BWI Airport or in the Maryland State House.
