= Kalulis =

Keelless boat from East Indonesia

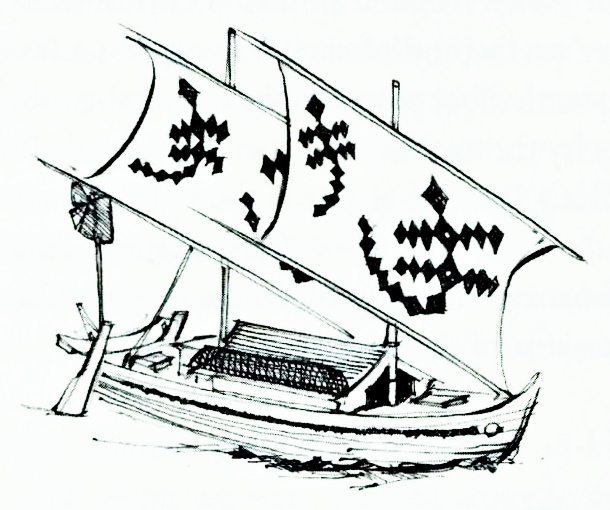
A sketch of Alfred Wallace, a kalulis used by Tim Severin.

Kalulis is a type of traditional boat from eastern Indonesia. It is mainly built in Kei islands, Southeast from Seram. It is mainly used for interinsular transport, and they are unsuitable for long haul voyages between Moluccas, Sulawesi, and Java. It is also known as perahu kalulis, ang kalulis, kalulus, and kulis.

== Description ==
The Kalulis is fairly shallow and beamy, and rigged with tanja rig on 1 or 2 masts, presumably in tripod mast. It is steered using double lateral rudders, and has a deckhouse. These boats are internally dowelled and contain lugs on all the planks. In the past, they were lashed together using fiber through carved lugs on the plank interior, but this technique disappeared in Kei islands during 1940s. They are between 4.5 and 14 m in length, with beam-to-length ratio varied between 1:2.33 to 1:3. The average depth of 5.25–7.5 m long kalulis was 1.3 m.

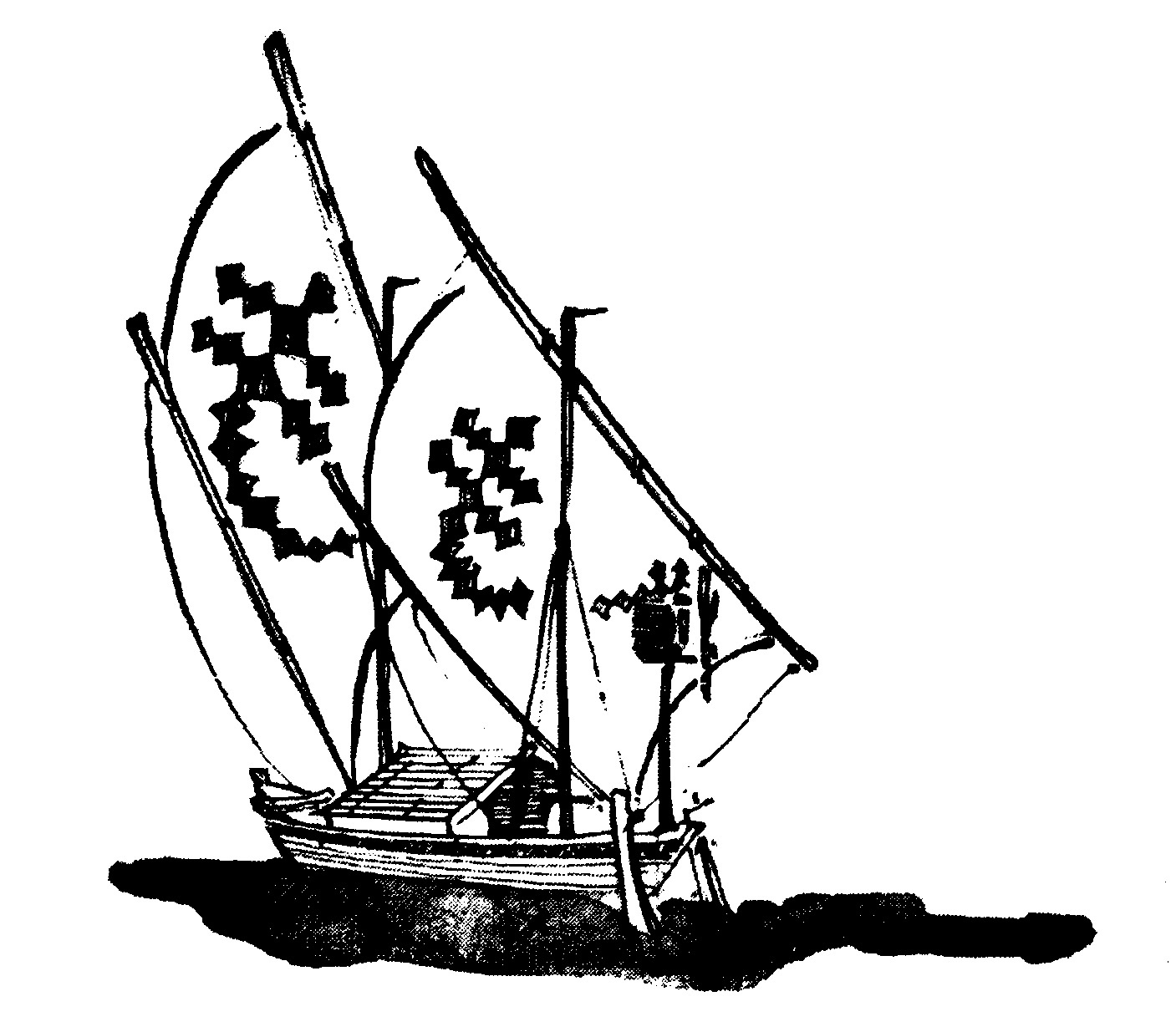
Another view of Alfred Wallace.

Since 1945, they have been fitted with fixed wooden ribs (gading) and had 5-8 planks. Materials of modern boats are different from older boats: The ropes were originally made from coconut husk (tali utis) and gemutu (tali nauk) and were replaced by polypropylene ropes. The sail which was made from sago leaf matting or karoro (sacking, sorat pisang of Java), is now made from cotton or polypropylene cloth, sometimes polyethylene sheets. Modern boats used the gaff and gunter (nade) rig. The double lateral rudders (cangkilan) generally have been replaced by a centerline rudder. Because they had no keel, stability was an issue, so they were not suited for voyage between main islands of Indonesia.

== Role ==
They are used for middle-distance journey between Geser, Gorom, Watubela, Teor, Kei, Tayandu, Aru, and Papuan coasts. These boats are used for transporting passengers and cargo, and occasionally for fishing, turtle hunting, and collecting agar-agar. These boats are the traditional mainstay for sago inter-island trade.

== Replica ==
- One replica of kalulis built by Tim Severin is named Alfred Wallace. The boat is used in "The Spice Islands Voyage", the last of Severin's nautical adventures, reenacting naturalist Alfred Russel Wallace's voyage in the archipelago. The 14-metre craft was much smaller than those generally used by Wallace. Severin did have a few modern adaptations: a satellite communications system, a wind generator and a nine-horsepower motor for emergencies.

== See also ==
- Knabat bogolu
- Kelulus
- Jong
- Orembai
- Benawa
