= Lisa von Lübeck =

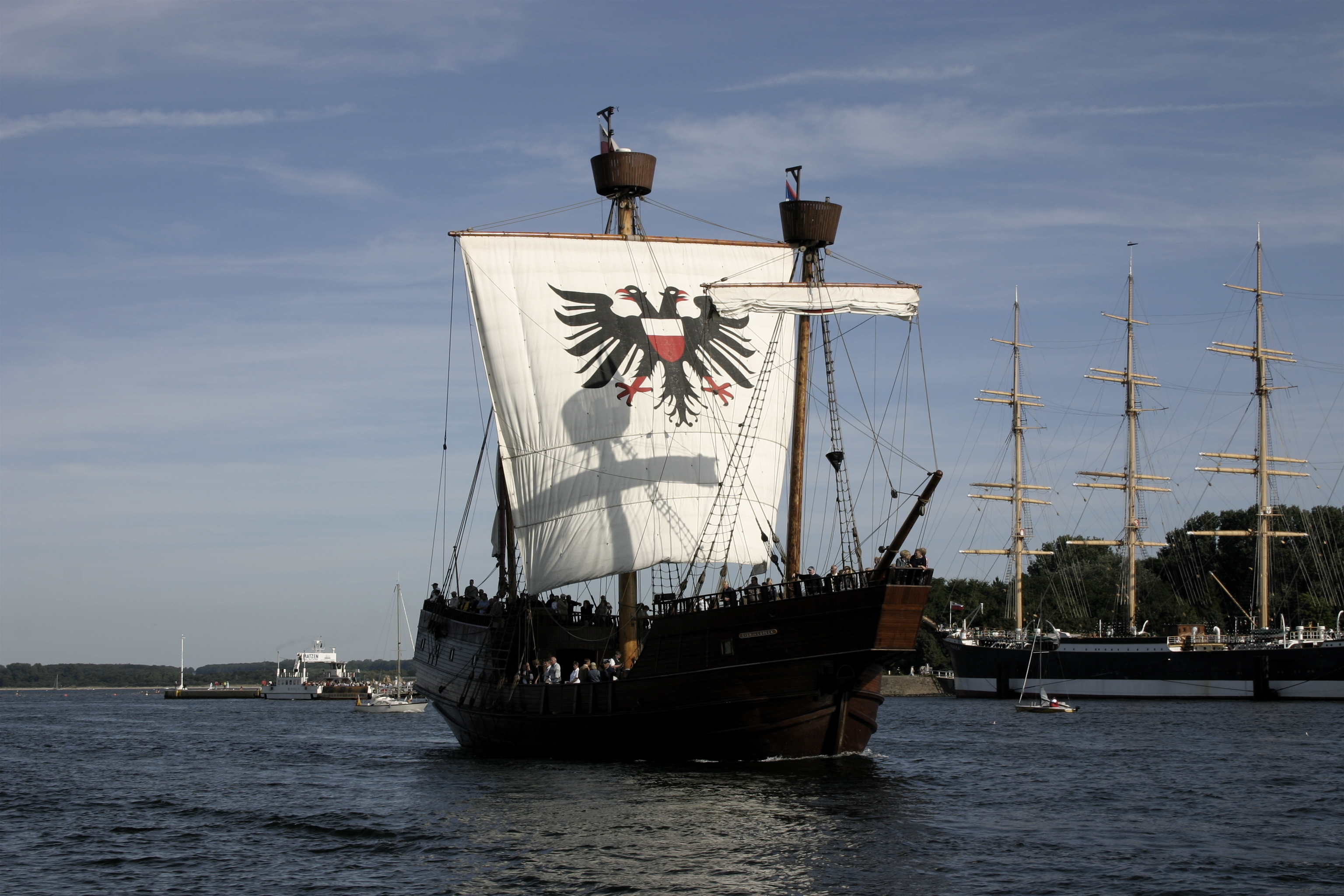
- Lisa von Lübeck on the river Trave in Travemünde.

History

Germany
- Name: Lisa von Lübeck
- Port of registry: Lübeck
- Launched: 2004
- In service: 2005
- Identification: MMSI number: 211136000; Callsign: DKVI

General characteristics
- Class & type: Kraweel
- Length: 36 metres (118 ft)
- Propulsion: Sails

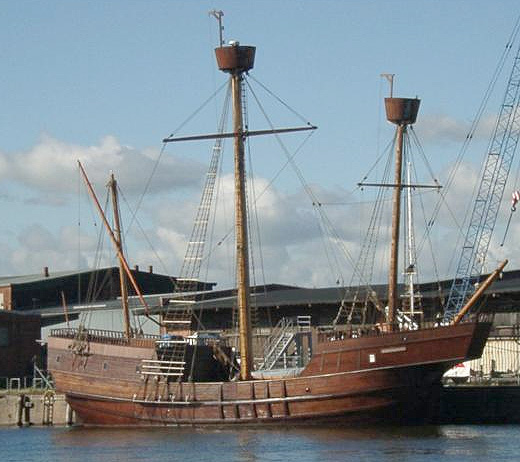
Berthed at homeport

Lisa von Lübeck is a reconstruction of a 15th-century Kraweel, which is based in Lübeck, Germany.

== History ==
The reconstruction of a sailing ship used by the Hanseatic League started 1999 as a social project in Lübeck's harbour. The ship was launched in 2004. In 2005 she made her first voyage on the Baltic Sea.

On 20 June 2013, Lisa von Lübeck collided with the Russian Navy's training ship Sedov off the island Texel, North Holland, Netherlands. Both vessels put into Den Helder. On 12 June 2015, she collided with the ro-ro cargo ship MV Transpaper on the Trave off Travemünde. She lost her bowsprit in the accident.
