= Waratah Coal =

Coal mining company

- Traded as: ASX: WCI; TSX-V: WCI
- Industry: Coal mining
- Founded: 2005
- Headquarters: Brisbane, Australia
- Parent: Mineralogy
- Website: www.waratahcoal.com

Waratah Coal, not to be confused with the Waratah Coal Company (1863-1893), is an Australian coal mining company. Founded in 2005, it is a subsidiary of Mineralogy. It holds explorations permits within the Laura, Bowen, Galilee and Surat Basins.

== History ==
Waratah Coal was founded in 2005 and listed on the Toronto Stock Exchange. In December 2008it became a dual listed company when listed on the Australian Securities Exchange. In April 2009 it was taken over by Mineralogy and delisted.

== Management ==
Between 2006 and 2010 Peter Lynch was CEO and President of the company.

== Plans ==
Waratah Coal is seeking approval for a new coal-fired power station in Central Queensland, near the town of Alpha. The company says, in its submission to the Queensland Government's deputy premier, that "it is Waratah Coal’s intention that the power station be a net-zero power plant from its initial commissioning," and that it would be "the first coal fired power project in Australia to use Ultra-Supercritical steam cycle, also known as High Efficiency-Low Emissions (HELE)"

The company's plans to develop the Galilee Coal Project, a mine directly to the north west of Alpha, were set back in November 2022 by a lawsuit by Murrawah Maroochy Johnson, leading to the Queensland Land Court's determination that "human rights would be unjustifiably limited", saying that it would impact the human rights of First Nations peoples "by contributing to climate change". The court's president, Fleur Kingham, ruled that the preservation of human rights outweighed economic benefits. She said that, "As a matter of law, I have decided I can take the emissions into account in applying the principles of ecologically sustainable development". She went on to say that her decision was based solely on the merits of this particular project, and should not be seen as a blanket ruling against the development of any new coal mines in Queensland.

The company also seeks to develop the North Alpha Coal Project, another coal mine, which lies further to the north of Alpha.
