= Vaka katea =

Cook Islander sailboat model

Vaka katea are the traditional sailing double canoe watercraft of the Cook Islands.

== See also ==
- Rarotonga
