= Daying County =

Daying County 大英县
- County
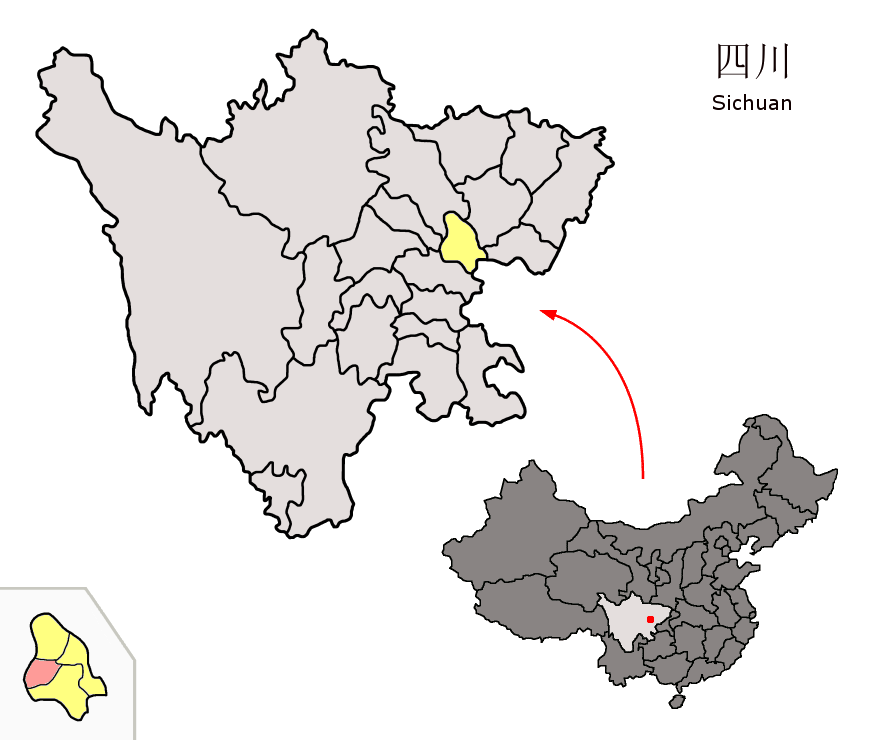
- Location of Daying County (pink) within Suining City (yellow) and Sichuan

- Location of the county town in Sichuan
- Coordinates: 30°36′N 105°14′E
- Country: China
- Province: Sichuan
- Prefecture-level city: Suining
- County seat: Penglai

Area
  - Total: 703 km^{2} (271 sq mi)
- Elevation: 305 m (1,001 ft)

Population (2020 census)
  - Total: 387,299
  - Density: 551/km^{2} (1,430/sq mi)
- Time zone: UTC+8 (China Standard)

Daying County (simplified Chinese: 大英县; traditional Chinese: 大英縣; pinyin: Dàyīng Xiàn) is a county of Sichuan province, China, under the administration of Suining City and in the central part of the Sichuan Basin. In 2020, it had a population of 387,299 residing in an area of 703 km^{2} (271 sq mi).

== Tourist attractions ==
Daying is the home of the "Chinese Dead Sea", a tourist attraction that is based on a salt lake with nine times the salinity of the ocean and which constitutes the largest indoor water park in China.

A stationary replica of the Titanic is under construction in Daying County as well.

== Administrative divisions ==
Daying County comprises 1 subdistrict and 9 towns:

subdistrict

- Yanjing 盐井街道

towns

- Penglai 蓬莱镇
- Longsheng 隆盛镇
- Huima 回马镇
- Tianbao 天保镇
- Hebian 河边镇
- Zhuotongjing 卓筒井镇
- Yufeng 玉峰镇
- Xiangshan 象山镇
- Jinyuan 金元镇

== Transportation ==
The G42 Shanghai–Chengdu Expressway and Dazhou–Chengdu Railway (达成铁路) traverses east–west through the entire length of the county.

The county is served by the Daying East Station (大英东站) on the Suining–Chengdu Railway.
