= Titanic II =

Planned passenger ocean liner

History

- Name: Titanic II
- Owner: Blue Star Line Pty. Ltd, Brisbane, Australia
- Operator: Blue Star Line Cruises
- Port of registry: Southampton
- Route: Southampton–New York City
- Builder: TBD
- Cost: $500 million (estimated)
- Maiden voyage: June 2027 (planned)

General characteristics
- Class & type: Modern interpretation of Olympic-class ocean liner
- Tonnage: 56,000 GT (estimate)
- Length: 269.15 m (883.0 ft)
- Beam: 32.2 m (105 ft 8 in)
- Height: 53.35 m (175.0 ft)
- Draught: 7.5 m (24 ft 7 in) (normal); 7.926 m (26 ft 0 in) (max)
- Depth: 19.74 m (64.8 ft)
- Decks: 10
- Installed power: 2 × Wärtsilä 12V46F; 2 × Wärtsilä 8L46F; 48,000 kW (64,000 hp) (combined)
- Propulsion: Diesel-electric; three azimuth thrusters; (3 × 10 MW)
- Speed: 24 knots (44 km/h; 28 mph) (maximum)
- Capacity: 1,680 (double capacity); 2,435 (maximum)
- Crew: 900

Titanic II is a planned passenger ocean liner intended to be a functional modern-day replica of the Olympic-class RMS Titanic. The new ship is planned to have a gross tonnage (GT) of 56,000, while the original ship measured about 46,000 gross register tons (GRT). (Note: The original Titanic had a gross register tonnage of 46,328 GRT, which is not directly comparable with modern gross tonnage. However, as one register ton is equal to 100 cubic feet (2.83 m^{3}), an approximate value of 39,640 GT can be calculated by using the formulae given in The International Convention on Tonnage Measurement of Ships, 1969.) The project was announced by Australian billionaire Clive Palmer in April 2012 as the flagship of the proposed cruise company Blue Star Line Pty. Ltd. of Brisbane, Australia. The intended launch date was originally set for 2016, delayed to 2018 then delayed to 2022, then later delayed to 2027. Development of the project resumed in November 2018 after a hiatus which began in 2015, caused by a financial dispute, which affected the $500 million project.

By the end of 2018, Blue Star Line, owner of the proposed Titanic II, made no further announcements regarding the vessel. The company remained silent on the project for over five years and did not release any further updates relating to the ocean liner until 13 March 2024, when it was announced that "Titanic II" would set sail on its maiden voyage in June 2027.

== Previous projects ==
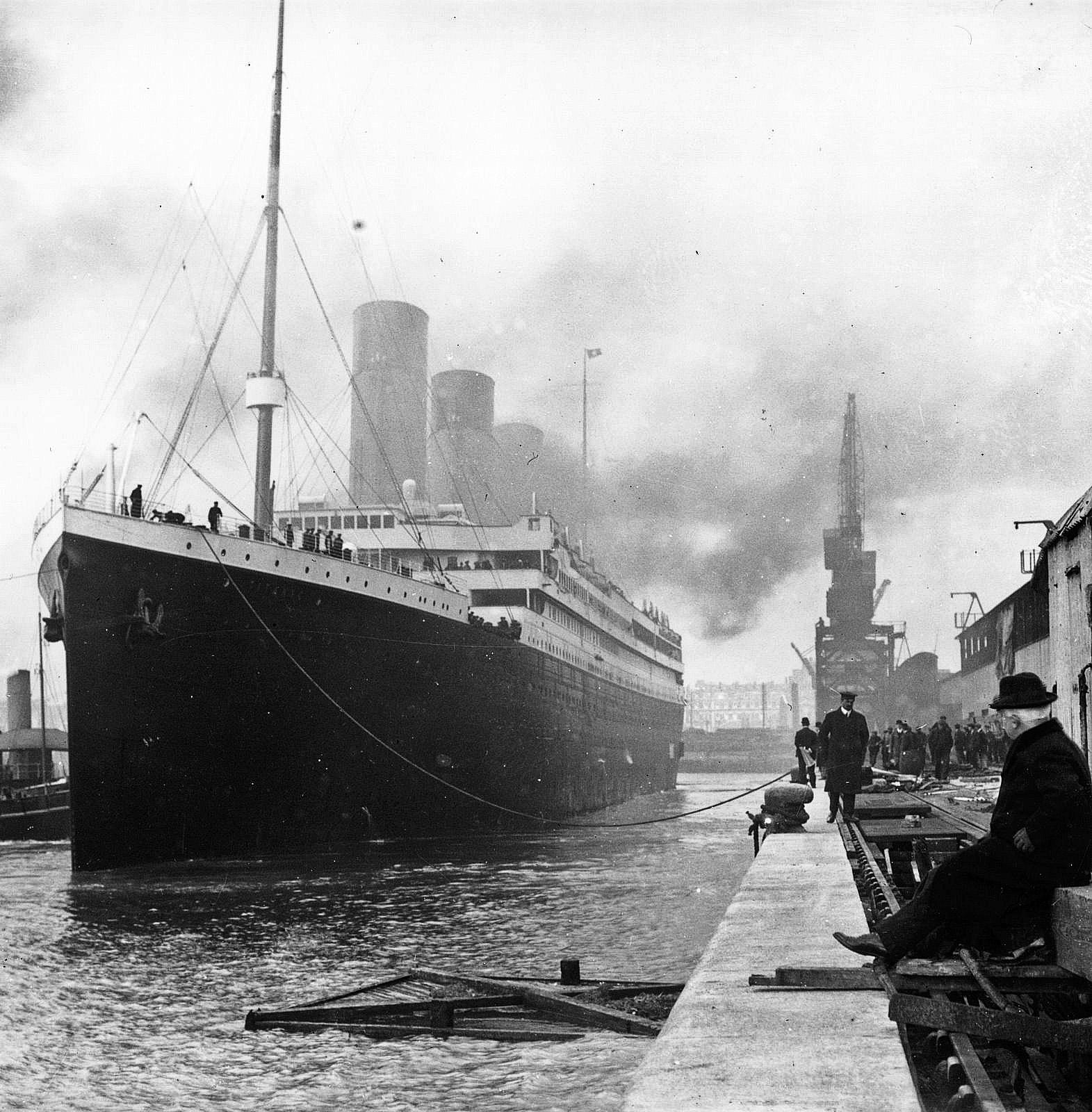
The original RMS Titanic in 1912

The concept of a functioning replica of the Titanic has been explored several times, especially following the resurgence of interest following the release of James Cameron's film, Titanic in 1997. The most widely publicized project was that of South African businessman Sarel Gous in 1998. The South African project began in 1998, and was one of the subjects of an article in Popular Mechanics magazine in September of that year. The article discussed the changes to the original design required to produce a safe and economically viable ship, including a welded rather than riveted hull, diesel-electric propulsion in place of steam engines, and a bulbous bow. The article concluded that although the various Titanic revival projects would cost $400–$600 million, they could be economically viable.

Although he originally intended to construct the ship in Durban, Gous presented his £500 million proposal to Belfast City Council in June 2000. He commissioned Olsen Designs to design the ship, advised by Harland and Wolff Technical Services who produced a feasibility study, and Callcott Anderson to design the interior. In November 2000, he began his attempts to raise capital, including through government grants and a stock market flotation. After signing an agreement with a Monaco-based investment banking company, Gous claimed that construction would begin at Harland and Wolff within nine months. The design changed repeatedly, with claims emerging of 'the world's largest liner' with capacity for 2,600 passengers, and increasingly divergent plans for a heliport, swimming pools and discos eventually being released. In 2006, after repeatedly failing to secure investment, the project was abandoned.

== Design stage ==
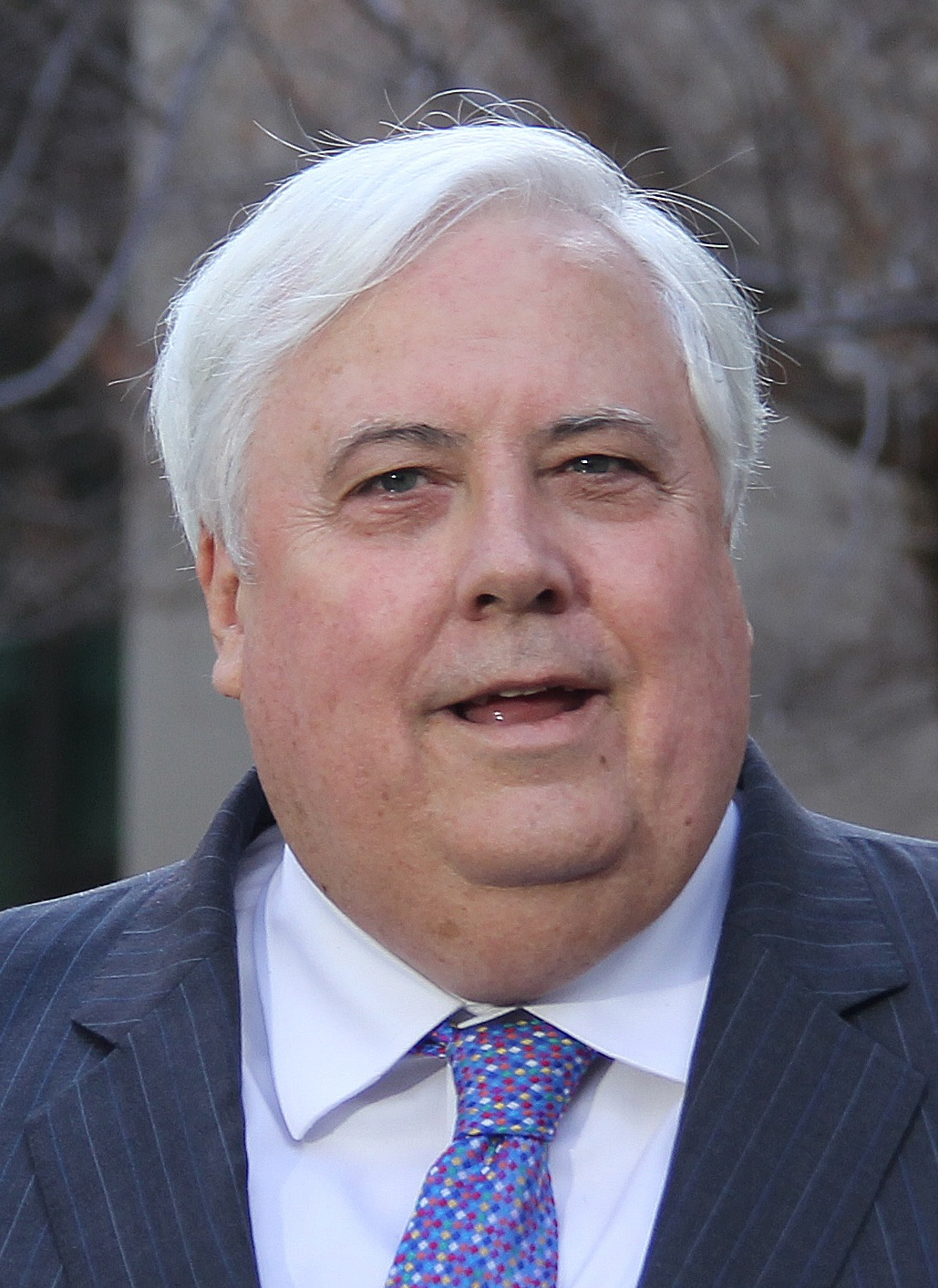
Clive Palmer, chairman of the Blue Star Line

Clive Palmer first announced the project in a press conference on 30 April 2012, following the signature of a memorandum of understanding with state-owned Chinese shipyard CSC Jinling ten days before. On 19 June, it was announced that Finnish naval architecture firm Deltamarin Ltd. had been commissioned to undertake the design of the ship, and on 17 July a preliminary general arrangement was published.

In October 2012, Blue Star Line announced that Titanic expert Steve Hall had been appointed as Design Consultant and Historian for the project, and that Titanic interiors expert Daniel Klistorner had been appointed as Interior Design Consultant and Historian. Hall and Klistorner had previously co-authored books on the ship, such as Titanic: The Ship Magnificent and Titanic in Photographs, and gave a technical presentation at the unveiling of the designs in New York as well as at the dinner in London. Later that month, it was announced that an advisory board would be formed to provide "suggestions and recommendations to Blue Star Line to ensure the Titanic II appropriately and respectfully pays homage to Titanic, her crew and passengers." Terry Ismay, the great-great-nephew of White Star Line chairman and Titanic survivor J. Bruce Ismay, will be a member of the board, as well as Helen Benziger, great-granddaughter of Titanic survivor Margaret "Molly" Brown.

The design for the Titanic II was unveiled at worldwide launch events in Macau (China), New York (United States), Halifax (Canada), and London & Southampton (United Kingdom). The gala event in New York was the official Global Launch and was held aboard the USS Intrepid in New York City on 26 February 2013. The gala dinner in London (UK) was held at the Natural History Museum on 2 March, and was accompanied by a display of items salvaged from the Titanic. There was also a breakfast held in Southampton on 13 March.

On 16 April 2013, it was announced that Deltamarin had been contracted for the project development phase, and would be responsible for coordinating the various parties involved in the project, including the shipyard, architects, interior designers, and operations managers. The feasibility study was complete, and the project development phase was ongoing. The signature of a contract and keel laying were expected in March 2014.

Further contracts and agreements relating to the design and construction were announced later in 2013; the appointment of V.Ships Leisure as ship management services partner, and of Tillberg Design as provider of architectural and interior design services. On 17 July 2013, Blue Star Line announced that the classification society Lloyd's Register has joined the Titanic II project. The work carried by Lloyd's would ensure that the ship's design complied with the current SOLAS regulations.

Model testing using a 9.3-metre (31 ft) wooden model was undertaken in September 2013 at the Hamburgische Schiffbau-Versuchsanstalt (HSVA). Resistance and powering tests were carried out in a 300-metre (980 ft) towing tank.

In an interview in February 2014, Palmer claimed that keel laying would take place in September 2014. He cautioned that the project was "a big job", that the original Titanic took seven years to build and that they have been working for only two and a half, and said that he would have liked to start sooner but "wanted to make sure we don't make any mistakes". He claimed that a selection of cabins were being constructed on land for approval, and that this would be completed by July 2014.

In April 2016, the administrators for Palmer's closed nickel-refining company, Queensland Nickel, alleged that almost $6 million had been taken from that company to pay for the development and marketing of the Titanic II. At that time the administrators indicated that they would seek to recover this money.

== Design and construction ==
The gross tonnage of the replica will be 56,000 GT, about 10,000 GT more than that of the original.

=== Comparison with the original RMS Titanic ===
The ship is designed to be as similar in internal and external appearance to the Titanic as possible. However, today's safety regulations and economic considerations dictated several major changes to the design, including:

- Greater beam for enhanced stability
- Welded, not riveted, hull
- Reduced draft
- Bulbous bow for higher fuel efficiency, although moderately sized compared to ships of newer designs

A preliminary comparison of the profiles of the Titanic (blue) and the Titanic II (red)

- Stabilizers to reduce roll
- Diesel-electric propulsion system, with four diesel generators providing power to three azimuth thrusters. This configuration replaces the original coal-fired boilers, steam engines & steam turbine, and rudder. Also, the Titanic II is designed to have two bow thrusters.
- An additional "safety deck" between C and D decks for lifeboats and marine evacuation systems, with the boat deck housing replicas of the original lifeboats. Space for the deck was made by lowering decks D and below by 2.8 meters, and for the taller center section of the safety deck, which would have housed the lifeboats, by raising the superstructure by 1.3 meters. In spite of the reduced draft, space was made for the lowered decks by removing the orlop deck, which mainly housed the boilers.
- New 'escape staircases' in addition to the original staircases, housed in the redundant boiler exhaust uptakes.
- Observation decks in the first two redundant funnels, which would have had, according to Deltamarin, tinted window coverings to blend in with the funnels' color, intended to be as close as possible to the original "White Star buff."
- No sheer or camber, unlike the original. Pronounced sheer was a cosmetic feature of ocean liners, intended to add a graceful appearance to the ship, but made construction more difficult and therefore costly. Renderings released in February 2013 showed an upwards rake added to C Deck at the bow and stern to give a superficial appearance of sheer, although an inauthentic wedge-shaped gap has had to be added between C and D decks in these areas to produce this effect.
- A higher bridge relative to the bow, as the superstructure has been raised by 1.3 meters by the centre section of the safety deck, and also by the removal of the sheer. This negates the requirement on the original Titanic for lookouts.
- An overall increase in the height of the ship above the waterline (due to the insertion of the safety deck). However, the total height of the ship from the keel to funnels would be the same as the original, at 175 feet (53 m).

=== Power plant and propulsion ===
For economic reasons, the steam engines and coal-fired boilers of the original Titanic would be replaced with a modern diesel-electric propulsion system. The space which housed the boilers would be used for crew quarters and ships systems. Power was to be produced by four Wärtsilä 46F medium-speed four-stroke diesel generators; two 12-cylinder 12V46F engines producing 14,400 kilowatts (19,300 hp) each, and two 8-cylinder 8L46F engines producing 9,600 kilowatts (12,900 hp) each, running on heavy fuel oil and marine gas oil. Propulsion would have been by three azimuth thrusters which would also be used for maneuvering, while the replica of the rudder of the Titanic II is purely cosmetic, and would not have extended substantially below the waterline. The positioning of the azimuth thrusters necessitated the stern being made substantially blunter than the original.

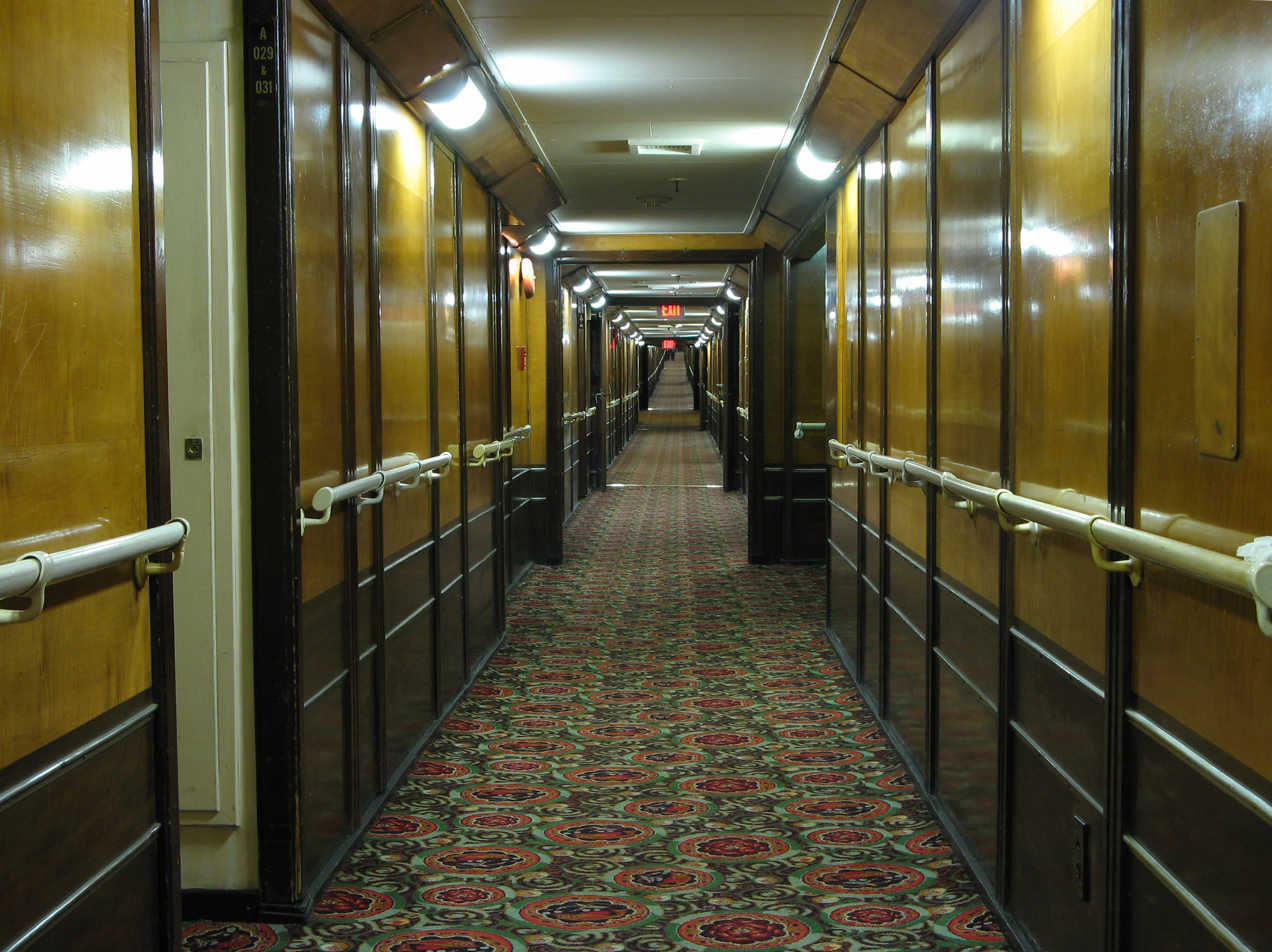
View of a corridor on the RMS Queen Mary showing the sheer. This feature was to be lost on the Titanic II.

=== Interior ===
The interior of the ship was intended to be as similar as possible to the original. Tillberg Design of Sweden was contracted to produce drawings replicating Titanic's original interiors. However, the original wooden panelling does not conform to modern fire regulations, so as in Queen Mary 2, veneers would have had to be used. Plans showed a layout broadly similar to the original, but with the third-class cabins modernized, and consideration being given to en-suite bathrooms throughout the ship. The room freed up by eliminating the steam boilers of the original ship would have been used for crew quarters and various services. Additionally, each cabin is planned to contain a panel that documents the history of the person who occupied that cabin on Titanic.

== Criticism ==
Clive Palmer, who created and formerly served as chairman of the right-wing to far-right United Australia Party, has been described as an "eccentric billionaire" with a reputation for bizarre publicity stunts, such as the attempt to create a massive Jurassic Park–style dinosaur theme park at his golf resort. It has also been noted that the publicity surrounding the Titanic II coincided with Palmer's announcement of his entry into Australian federal politics, which was made immediately following the Titanic II conference. Palmer had previously claimed that he was the target of a conspiracy involving Barack Obama, the CIA, the Rockefeller Foundation, and Greenpeace, who he believed were attempting to close down his mining operation. In 2010, Palmer started a company called Zeppelin International, with the intention of making a commercially viable Zeppelin. After the plan came to nothing, it was ridiculed as the "bizarre move of the year" by Australian business website Smartcompany. He has gained a reputation in Australia for floating ambitious and unusual business ideas which he fails to see through, and the Titanic II has been described as "a classic Clive Palmer announcement."

The idea of a commercialized real-life replica of the Titanic has itself been criticized, being described as "insensitive" and "a mockery of the memory of those who died". Charles Haas, president of the U.S.-based Titanic International Society, questioned both its appropriateness and commercial viability, telling Scientific American, "It's a matter of sensitivity, respect and thoughtfulness ... we commemorate tragedies and those lost in them, not duplicate them". The New York Times quoted Haas as saying, "As good as the Titanic was in her day, it would be a practical and financial disaster" due to the relative lack of onboard activities and modern amenities such as theaters, casinos, and waterslides, compared to today's cruise ships. Cunard Line, which acquired the White Star Line legacy when the companies merged in 1934, stated that they "have always been very mindful and very respectful of such a tragic event [and] don't think that building a replica or a 'II' is appropriate."

Palmer's alleged use of funds drawn from Queensland Nickel for the Titanic II project was criticized by the administrators appointed for that company after it closed. In their April 2016 report, the administrators stated that payments from Queensland Nickel to Blue Star Line had been "uncommercial and director-related transactions". Palmer has rejected the claims made against him in the report, including those related to the Titanic II.

== Project status ==
When the project was first announced in 2012, Palmer claimed that construction would begin before the end of the year, with a 2016 launch. The following year, reports emerged that Clive Palmer was experiencing financial difficulties. The start of construction was postponed to March 2014, then to late 2014. When construction had still not begun in 2015, a spokesman for Palmer said the project had merely been delayed, and that the new ship would be launched in 2018, two years later than initially planned. However, Deltamarin had told an Australian Broadcasting Corporation journalist that work on the Titanic II project had been halted, while workers at the Chinese shipyard identified as the likely site of construction were highly skeptical that the project would ever move beyond the proposal stage and that the Blue Star Line trademark was "abandoned."

On 27 September 2018, the Blue Star Line, in a press release on their official website, announced that work on the project would recommence. Deltamarin confirmed that work had resumed and that the project had advanced to having a conceptual design ready for shipyard pricing. As of January 2019, Blue Star Line had made no updates to its website after 2018 and Deltamarin referred all questions about the project back to Blue Star. A Belfast paper reported that Palmer began to doubt the economic viability of the ship once initial interest and curiosity had worn off. In September 2022, a London-based financial site contacted Blue Star for a status update but received no response.

On 13 March 2024, Palmer held a press conference to announce his revival of the Titanic II project. He anticipated that construction would begin in 2025, although a shipyard had yet to be selected. Citing the COVID-19 pandemic as a major factor, prior plans for the ship did not push through, while promising the contract tender for the construction released and signed by June and December 2024, respectively. In June 2026, a New York-based industry publication listed all new cruise ships ordered through 2039 but none of the listed vessels were for the Blue Star Line nor did any fit Titanic II's specifications.

== See also ==
- Replica Titanic
