= Clive Palmer =

Australian businessman and politician (born 1954)

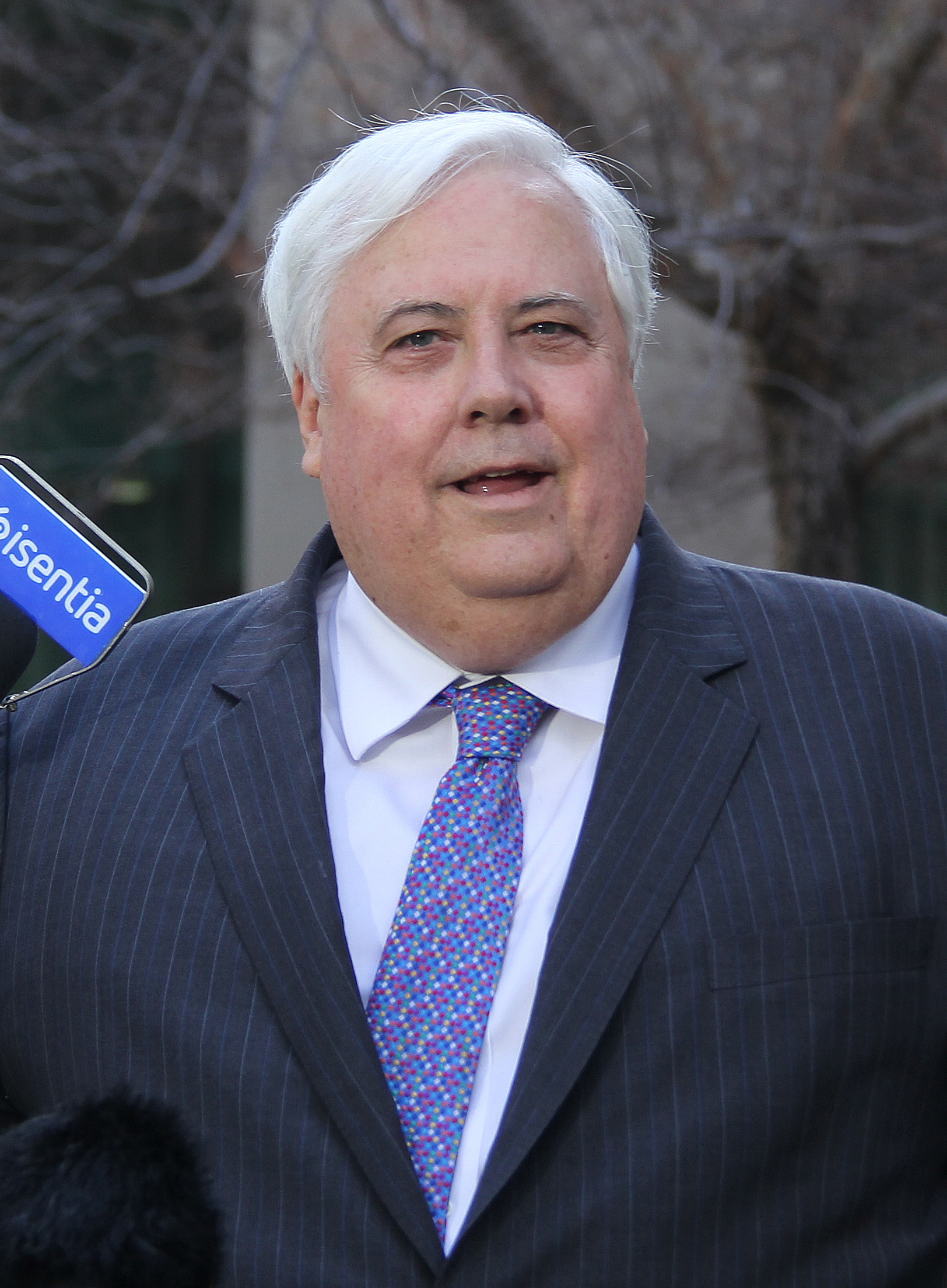
- Palmer in 2015

Member of the Australian Parliament for Fairfax
- In office 7 September 2013 – 9 May 2016
- Preceded by: Alex Somlyay
- Succeeded by: Ted O'Brien

Chairman of United Australia Party
- Incumbent
- Assumed office 16 March 2026 (Australian Federation Party)
- Leader: Ralph Babet
- Preceded by: Party re-registered
- In office 19 February 2025 – 18 September 2025 (Trumpet of Patriots)
- President: Nick Duffield
- Leader: Suellen Wrightson
- Chairman: Glenn O'Rourke
- Preceded by: Party established
- Succeeded by: Party dissolved
- In office 12 December 2018 – 8 September 2022 (United Australia Party)
- Deputy: Brian Burston; Ralph Babet
- Leader: Craig Kelly
- Preceded by: Party re-registered
- Succeeded by: Party deregistered
- In office April 2013 – 5 May 2017 (Palmer United Party)
- Deputy: Jacqui Lambie
- Leader: Glenn Lazarus; John Bjelke-Petersen
- Preceded by: Party established
- Succeeded by: Party dissolved

Personal details
- Born: Clive Frederick Palmer; 26 March 1954 (age 72) Footscray, Victoria, Australia
- Party: United Australia (since 2013)
- Other political affiliations: National (1969–2008); Liberal National (2008–2012); Trumpet of Patriots (2025)
- Spouses: Susan Parker (m. 1983; died 2006) Annastacia Topalov (m. 2007)
- Children: 4
- Parent(s): George Palmer; Nancy McArthur
- Education: Aquinas College; Southport State High School; Toowoomba Grammar School
- Alma mater: University of Queensland
- Occupation: Mining company chairman: Mineralogy; ResourceHouse; Waratah Coal; Shipping company chairman: Blue Star Line; Holiday resort hotel owner: Palmer Coolum Resort
- Profession: Businessman; Politician
- Website: unitedaustraliaparty.org.au

Clive Frederick Palmer (born 26 March 1954) is an Australian billionaire businessman and politician. He has iron ore, nickel, and coal holdings, and owns various mining and resort businesses. Palmer founded the Palmer United Party in 2013, and was the member of parliament (MP) for the Queensland division of Fairfax from 2013 to 2016.

Palmer has been involved in frequent legal cases relating to his businesses, and has mentioned litigation as a hobby of his in Who's Who, with journalist Hedley Thomas reporting that "His lawyers take legal steps [...] that prolong litigation and rack up costs for the other side" which can result in his opponents being unable to continue their case due to a lack of finances. Palmer has also attempted to use legal action as a gag order against his workers.

As of May 2025, Palmer was the fifth richest Australian, when the Australian Financial Review assessed his net worth at A$20.12 billion on the 2025 Rich List. Businesses that Palmer owns include Mineralogy, Waratah Coal, Queensland Nickel, Palmer Coolum Resort on the Sunshine Coast, Palmer Sea Reef Golf Course in Port Douglas, Palmer Colonial Golf Course in Robina, and the Palmer Gold Coast Golf Course, also at Robina. He owned Gold Coast United FC from 2008 to 2012.

== Early life ==
Palmer was born on 26 March 1954 at Footscray Hospital in Footscray, a suburb of Melbourne, Victoria. He spent his early years in the nearby suburb of Williamstown. His family moved to Queensland in 1963, and Palmer was largely raised on the Gold Coast, where he attended Aquinas College and Southport State High School, although he also attended Toowoomba Grammar School for a short time. Palmer's father, George, was a travel agent, and the family travelled the world extensively. Palmer has claimed that, amidst a months long trip to China, he sat on the lap of Mao Zedong at the age of nine. George Palmer was also the proprietor of the Akron Tyre Co and the Akron Broadcasting Co and was the founder of Melbourne broadcasting station 3AK (now operating as SEN 1116).

Palmer studied law, journalism and politics at the University of Queensland from 1973 to 1975, but did not finish the course. He later completed a Diploma of Law through the Queensland Bar Board, and worked as a clerk and interviewing officer for the Public Defender's Office.

== Business career ==
=== Real estate ===
During the early to mid-1980s, Palmer worked as a real estate agent. He did well from the property boom on the Gold Coast, and retired from real estate at the age of 29.

=== Mineralogy ===
In 1985 and 1986 Palmer founded three companies which undertook mining exploration in Western Australia (WA). These included Mineralogy, a company which in 2006 had 160 billion tonnes (160×10^{9} long tons; 180×10^{9} short tons) of iron ore reserves in the Pilbara Ranges, in remote northern Western Australia. In 2008, Palmer bought Waratah Coal. Palmer transferred Mineralogy to New Zealand in December 2018, and moved it again to Singapore in January 2019.

Mineralogy has been involved in a long-running dispute with CITIC over a royalty payment. Mineralogy and CITIC entered into an agreement in 2006 to develop some of the iron ore reserves Palmer owns. In November 2017, Justice Kenneth Martin of the Supreme Court of Western Australia awarded Mineralogy nearly $200 million. Palmer said the decision was "a win for Australian law over Chinese Communist government powerhouses". As of May 2019, CITIC was suing Palmer and he had counter-sued them for $5 billion.

In August 2020, the WA Parliament passed an emergency bill to block a legal claim against the government by Palmer, relating to Mineralogy. WA Attorney-General John Quigley estimated the claim as totalling $30 billion, which he described as "rapacious" and equivalent to the annual budget of WA. Palmer denied that estimate and mounted a challenge in the Federal Court to the legislation as unconstitutional.

On 28 March 2023, Palmer's Singapore-based company, Zeph Investments, filed a notice of arbitration, suing the Commonwealth of Australia for A$296 billion over the alleged loss of contractual entitlement, “moral damages” and “sovereign risk”, in relation to the iron ore project for which Palmer's company, Mineralogy, had already lost a lawsuit. McGowan responded to the claim saying, "Today we have seen the most deplorable act of greed in Australian history", and "Clive Palmer is the greediest man in Australian history". The Attorney-General, Mark Dreyfus, said that the Commonwealth will "vigorously defend" the suit. The Permanent Court of Arbitration dismissed the suit in September 2025, ruling that it had no jurisdiction over a claim against a state by one of its own citizens; Palmer was not a 'foreign investor' through his Singapore-based company. He was ordered to pay costs of A$13.6m. It is now uncertain whether Palmer's three PCA cases against the government of Queensland, claiming a further total of A$120b, will proceed.

=== Queensland Nickel ===
In 2009, he bought Queensland Nickel and the Palmer Nickel and Cobalt Refinery after BHP was going to close the refinery. In the first year after purchasing the refinery, Palmer gifted staff 50 Mercedes Benz cars and thousands of overseas holidays after the refinery turned a huge profit. On 18 January 2016, Queensland Nickel entered voluntary administration. Palmer declined to pay the entitlements of workers who lost their jobs when Queensland Nickel closed, stating that "I have no personal responsibility, I retired from business over three years ago". He also blamed the administrators for sacking the workforce. This forced the Federal Government to cover the workers' entitlements.

In April 2019 Palmer announced that he intended to re-open the Queensland Nickel refinery and pay the $7.16 million still owed to workers following the 2019 federal election.

The Special Purpose Liquidator of Queensland Nickel stated that Palmer's offer was inadequate as it did not cover the money owed to small businesses and was unclear whether he would repay the Federal Government. The Liquidator was seeking $200 million from Palmer, other individuals and related entities, with a trial to take place from July 2019. The Australian Government was also seeking to recover $70 million from Palmer personally to meet the costs of the payments it made to Queensland Nickel workers through the same trial. Palmer stated in April 2019 that the administrators should repay the government as they were responsible for sacking the refinery's workers, and not him. The Canberra Times reported that 218 workers were made redundant shortly before the operation was placed into voluntary administration.

In August 2019 Palmer reached a settlement two weeks into a trial in the Queensland Supreme Court, understood to total $110m. He agreed to repay the federal government for the entitlements it has already paid under the Fair Entitlements Guarantee (FEG), “all other outstanding employee entitlements, and a full recovery for the majority of unsecured creditors”. Palmer maintained his position that the scheme should never have been triggered by the liquidators in the first place and under the terms of the Settlement Agreement, the Special Purpose Liquidator withdrew all claims the SPL made against Palmer and all of the defendants associated with him. All parties paid their own costs in the court matter; Palmer personally appeared in court and represented himself. A small number of debt claims against Mineralogy remain in dispute and before the courts. Palmer claimed that the settlement of the debts had left him “vindicated”. “Today's settlement confirms the actions against me were nothing more than a witch-hunt designed to smear my good reputation”, Palmer said.

=== Palmer Coolum Resort: Dinosaur Park ===
Palmer purchased the Coolum Hyatt Resort in 2011. He later announced plans to build a park featuring animatronic dinosaurs there. Palmer ordered more than 160 animatronic dinosaurs, which included an initial shipment of a 3.5-metre (11 ft) tall, 20-metre (66 ft) long T. rex, nicknamed "Jeff". Palmer received full council approval for the park on 25 July 2013, and it was expected to open to the public in 2014. On 14 December 2013, the dinosaur park, now called "Palmersaurus", was opened to the public. Palmer's installation of dinosaurs along the side of the resort's golf course led the Australian PGA Championship to be relocated from it.

The Palmer Coolum Resort was mothballed in 2015 due to low occupancy rates, with 600 people losing their jobs over the period after Palmer purchased the complex. In 2017, the ABC reported that "once regarded as one of south-east Queensland's most prestigious resorts, the site is a shadow of its former self and has been the centre of a legal battle between retirees who own villa shares and Clive Palmer". In 2018 the Australian Securities and Investments Commission charged Palmer with violations of the Corporation Act in relation to an attempt to take over timeshare villas at the resort in 2012. Palmer has stated that the charges are an attempt to stop him standing for election.

=== Soccer ===
Palmer purchased the Gold Coast United football club in 2008. In October 2009, he made a decision to cap attendances of Gold Coast United home games at Skilled Park stadium to 5,000, in a bid to save money by avoiding transport subsidies on crowds over 5,000. After a widespread backlash and only 2,616 fans attending the next home game, and the intervention of Football Federation Australia (FFA), the idea was scrapped.

On 29 February 2012, Ben Buckley and Frank Lowy announced that Palmer's licence for Gold Coast United FC was to be revoked for constant breaches of FFA rules and regulations and sought to pay out the contracts of the players for the remaining month of the season. Lowy stated that he acted to protect the integrity of the sport. However, Palmer stipulated that he would contest the decisions through legal action and claimed Lowy was a dictator. Despite a ruling ordering the removal of "Freedom of Speech" logos on team shirts, Palmer indicated they would remain. On 2 March 2012, Palmer lost his Supreme Court bid against Gold Coast United's expulsion from the A-League.

In 2012, after the FFA revoked his Gold Coast United A-League licence, Palmer founded Football Australia – a competing organisation for the sport of football in Australia.

=== Titanic II ===
In February 2013, at a press conference in New York, Palmer announced plans to build a modern-day replica of the liner RMS Titanic. It was planned that Titanic II would be built in China and make its maiden voyage from Southampton to New York City in 2016 (later postponed to 2018). Palmer hoped to recreate the Titanic as closely as possible to its familiar external and internal appearance. According to Palmer, the Titanic II would be 883 feet (269 m) long, weigh 55,800 long tons (56,700 t) gross, and carry 2,435 passengers and 900 crew. Palmer said the Titanic II would honour the memories of those who died and survived on the Titanic. The Titanic was operated by the White Star Line and Palmer's company is named Blue Star Line.

During the first half of 2015, evidence accumulated strongly suggesting that the project had been abandoned. The Blue Star Line trademark was listed as "abandoned". No construction had been ordered in the Chinese shipyard identified as the likely building site with the workers highly skeptical that the project would ever move beyond the proposal stage. In May 2016 it was reported by the administrators for an insolvent Palmer company, Queensland Nickel, that no significant money had been spent on the development of Titanic II in over two years. On 27 September 2018, in a press release on its official web site, the Blue Star Line announced that work on the project would recommence.

On 13 March 2024, Palmer held a press conference to announce his revival of the Titanic II project. He anticipated that construction would begin in 2025, although a shipyard had yet to be selected. Citing the COVID-19 Pandemic as a major factor, prior plans for the ship did not push through, while promising the contract tender for the construction released and signed by June and December 2024, respectively.

=== COVID-19 pandemic ===
==== Advertisements ====
In March 2020, as the COVID-19 pandemic was spreading in Australia, Palmer placed a prominent media advertisement offering to personally fund one million doses of a "cure" for the disease. The medication would include hydroxychloroquine, which is established in other countries as an anti-malarial drug but is known to have serious side-effects. The Australian drugs regulator, the Therapeutic Goods Administration (TGA), had warned that this drug and its derivatives “pose well-known serious risks to patients including cardiac toxicity potentially leading to sudden heart attacks, irreversible eye damage and severe depletion of blood sugar potentially leading to coma”. The TGA stated that it was considering legal action against Palmer. Other experts also criticised Palmer, concerning safety as well as the ethics of potentially producing a shortage of the drug in countries where it is needed to combat malaria. However, it was later confirmed that the federal health department planned to import hydroxychloroquine for emergency use, with a written agreement for partial funding by Palmer. On 28 April, Palmer placed further prominent advertisements in News Corp media, claiming to have purchased 32.9 million doses of hydroxychloroquine. The TGA stated that no action would be taken with respect to either set of advertisements, since they were "assessed as not intended to promote the sale of the product”. However, the President of the Royal Australian College of General Practitioners, Harry Nespolon, warned that trials of the drug were still ongoing and were "not looking particularly promising”. He was also concerned that "people may think that a cure is imminent and be lulled into a false sense of security so that they don't exercise social distancing responsibilities”.

In June 2021, as the COVID-19 pandemic continued, a Queensland radio network stopped playing an advertisement from Palmer that had stated:

Australia has had one COVID-19 associated death in 2021. But the TGA reports that there's been 210 deaths and over 24,000 adverse reactions after COVID vaccinations. Authorised by Clive Palmer, Brisbane.

The TGA had warned the network and Palmer that this was seriously misleading to the public: the figure of 210 deaths a few days or weeks after vaccination was statistically normal; only one of those deaths could be linked to the vaccination itself.

The same month, it was reported that Palmer had sent letters to households across Australia urging against vaccination for COVID-19, based on the discredited death figures. This was reported again in July, and that Palmer had disregarded a further warning from the TGA.

Palmer had requested that his name and logo be printed on the doses of donated hydroxychloroquine. The Department of Health denied Palmer's request.

==== Western Australia border closure ====
In July 2020, Palmer claimed that the closing of the borders by the Western Australian government owing to the COVID-19 pandemic was unconstitutional and challenged the WA legislation in the Federal Court. In response the Western Australian Premier Mark McGowan labelled Palmer an enemy of the state. Palmer also claimed that the border closure would "destroy the lives of hundreds of thousands of people for decades" and compared the death toll of COVID-19 with that of road accidents and influenza. By August, the Prime Minister of Australia Scott Morrison withdrew support of Palmer's legal challenge after receiving a public backlash on his previous supportive stance. Mark McGowan praised the Commonwealth for its withdrawal and indicated the Western Australian government would continue to fight the case and urging Palmer to withdraw the case labelling him "Australia's greatest egomaniac" and an "Olympic scale narcissist".

As the issues moved to the constitutional level, they came to involve possible conflict between major constitutional principles: parliamentary sovereignty and the rule of law. On 6 November 2020, the High Court upheld the legislation. Challenges to the constitutionality of amendments to the Act made in 2020 failed in the High Court on 13 October 2021.

In this context, Palmer sued McGowan for defamation and McGowan counter-sued Palmer for defamation. The Federal Court found on 2 August 2022 that each had defamed the other, awarded each a relatively small amount in damages and warned that such a dispute between prominent political figures should never have wasted the court's time and resources.

==== Palmer Group share selloff ====
In August 2021, Australian airline Qantas announced that it would require all of its 22,000 employees to be fully vaccinated against COVID-19. In reaction to this, the Palmer Group sold off its entire stake in Qantas.

=== Other activities ===
In June 2002, Palmer was appointed adjunct professor of business at Deakin University's Faculty of Business and Law, a role he held until 2006. During that time, he delivered a series of lectures as part of Deakin's MBA residential programs. In 2008, Palmer was appointed adjunct professor of management at Bond University on the Gold Coast.

In December 2012, Palmer was appointed joint secretary general of the World Leadership Alliance, a democracy-promoting council that included former US president Bill Clinton and Myanmar's opposition leader Aung San Suu Kyi. Palmer was named president of the alliance's business chapter, the World Economic Council.

In December 2012, on Christmas Day, Palmer hosted a buffet lunch for 650 disadvantaged people, mostly children and their families.

In July 2013, Palmer was referred to in an iPhone application as making light of Australian Prime Minister Julia Gillard by having sandwiches thrown at her. News Corp Australia publications were critical of the app, calling it sexist, while referring to his weight in an opinion poll with an option saying "We should have one for big Clive Palmer".

On 4 March 2012, Palmer was named, amid controversy, as a National Living Treasure by the New South Wales Branch of the National Trust of Australia. The Australian reported that workers at his nickel refinery were encouraged to vote for him.

In 2015, Palmer donated a house, car and food to victims of a house fire in Beenleigh that saw their son tragically lose his life.

Palmer has been a regular poster of memes on his official Facebook page. The memes often have nonsensical or ironic undertones, and contain reoccurring themes – such as Rupert Murdoch's control of the media in Australia, contrasting himself with other political figures such as Prime Minister Malcolm Turnbull, or paying homage to Tim Tam packets and his pet "Grog Dog". Palmer was once required to provide an affidavit explaining a tweet sent out during a hearing on 1 December 2017.

In September 2019, Palmer threatened to sue internet comedian Jordan Shanks for $500,000 for defamation relating to a YouTube video posted before the May 2019 election. The video created by Shanks called Palmer a "dense Humpty Dumpty" and a profane nickname that stated Palmer was a "Fatty McFuckhead". Shanks responded that he had not defamed Palmer and being required to prove his claims in court would not help Palmer.

In September 2023, the Federal Court dismissed a claim against the Australian Electoral Commission by Palmer and United Australia senator Ralph Babet that the ballot paper planned for the forthcoming constitutional referendum on an Indigenous Voice was unacceptably flawed, although that design had been used for referendums over several decades.

== Politics ==
=== Early activities ===
Palmer was active in the Liberal Movement headed by then-Premier of South Australia Steele Hall in the 1970s. He joined the Queensland division of the Nationals in 1974, having been influenced by the policies of Joh Bjelke-Petersen, Premier of Queensland at the time. From the early 1980s, he was involved in state politics, serving as the National Party's campaign director during the 1983 state election and as media spokesman during its 1986 election campaign, both of which were successful.

Palmer was a backer of the aborted "Joh for Canberra" campaign, which attempted to get Queensland Premier Bjelke-Petersen elected as Prime Minister of Australia at the 1987 federal election. Palmer was elected to life membership of the party in 1992, which he retained after the state branches of the Nationals and Liberal Party merged to form the Liberal National Party of Queensland in 2008.

Palmer was an unsuccessful republican candidate at the 1997 Australian Constitutional Convention election, heading the eleven-member "Elect the President" ticket. The group polled 1.7 percent of first-preference votes in Queensland.

=== 2013 candidacy ===
In late April 2012, Palmer announced that he would contest Liberal National Party preselection for the Division of Lilley at the 2013 federal election, held by Wayne Swan, the then Deputy Prime Minister and Treasurer. However, in July that year, he announced his intention to seek preselection for a different seat, including possibly the Division of Kennedy, held by Bob Katter of Katter's Australian Party (formerly sitting as a National and an independent).

Several months after announcing his intent to seek preselection, Palmer resigned his life membership of the Liberal National Party. His membership of the party had been suspended on 9 November 2012, following his comments on the actions of state government ministers. He was re-instated to the party on 22 November, but resigned the same day.

In March 2012, Palmer accused Drew Hutton and Greenpeace of receiving funding from the CIA, due to Hutton's involvement in the preparation of a Greenpeace strategy titled "Stopping the Australian Coal Export Boom". His claims were dismissed by Greenpeace senior campaigner John Hepburn as "ludicrous", and he said that Greenpeace would not accept money from any government, corporation or secret service. His claims were also rejected by the CIA.

On 25 April 2013, Palmer announced a "reformation" of the United Australia Party, which had been folded into the present-day Liberal Party in 1945, to stand candidates in the 2013 federal election, and had applied for its registration in Queensland. Another representative of a former South Australian political party, the United Party, lodged a formal objection to the registration of the name "Palmer United Party" with the Australian Electoral Commission (AEC). The AEC further determined that the names "Uniting Australia Party" and "Palmer United Party" were distinct and the name "Palmer United Party" was not prohibited.

=== Member of Parliament ===
Palmer ran as the candidate in the Sunshine Coast seat of Fairfax for his party in the 2013 Australian federal election. In the first count he won by only seven votes over Liberal National Party (LNP) candidate Ted O'Brien, triggering an automatic recount. While he had won only 26.5 percent of the primary vote, Palmer overtook O'Brien on Labor and Green preferences. During the recount, he filed many challenges to votes cast for O'Brien, and made unsupported claims that the Australian Electoral Commission was tainted by corruption. Ultimately, he was confirmed as winner with 50.3% of the vote – a margin of 53 votes.

His party was also successful in the Senate in 2013, where three of his party members were elected and won a shared balance of power. The senators were elected in Queensland, Western Australia and Tasmania. But soon the party fell into disarray. The Tasmanian Senator Jacqui Lambie resigned from the Palmer United Party on 24 November 2014 announcing that she would remain in the Senate as an independent. Lambie's resignation followed several weeks of disagreements with Palmer. The Queensland Senator Glenn Lazarus also quit the party on 13 March 2015 citing issues with Palmer.

In his maiden speech to federal parliament, Palmer implied that the government was "deaf to the everyday struggles of all Australians" and stated that "the entrenchment of the two-party system in this country not only threatens democracy but destroys the creativity of the nation."

Palmer was absent from Parliament more than any other MP in the 44th Parliament; he attended only 64 percent of sitting days in 2014 and 54 percent in 2015. He was rarely seen in his own electorate, preferring to reside at his Gold Coast residence. At one point, he went seven months without setting foot in Fairfax. His LNP opponent in 2013, O'Brien, claimed that many residents had come to him for help after not being able to get help from Palmer, to the point that many of them considered him their MP.

In May 2016, Palmer announced he would not seek reelection to his seat of Fairfax or run for the Senate and retire from politics. This all but assured that Fairfax would revert to the LNP; like most Sunshine Coast seats, it would have been a comfortably safe LNP seat in a traditional two-party matchup. O'Brien then reclaimed the seat for the LNP.

=== Subsequent political activities ===
Palmer deregistered the party's state branches in September 2016, initially intending to keep it active at the federal level. However, in April 2017, he announced that the party would be wound up.

In February 2018, Palmer announced his intention to resurrect his party and return to federal politics. The party was re-registered in June of that year under its original name, the United Australia Party. When using the name Palmer United, the party continued to brand itself as a revival of the original United Australia Party (1931–1945), claiming the three leaders of the original party, Joseph Lyons, Robert Menzies, and Billy Hughes as its former leaders. The UAP continued to claim former leaders of the original party for their election campaigns in 2019 and 2022. Former One Nation senator Brian Burston joined the party in June 2018.

In January 2019, Palmer released a mobile game titled Clive Palmer: Humble Meme Merchant, wherein players collect Tim Tams and avoid over Palmer's political foes.

In April 2019, Palmer stated that he would stand for the Senate in Queensland at the 2019 Australian federal election. Palmer spent $60 million at the 2019 election, with most of the advertising consisting of attacks on the Australian Labor Party (ALP). He and his party did not win any seats in the election.

Ahead of the 2019 election, Palmer altered the lyrics of the Twisted Sister song "We're Not Gonna Take It" to "Australia ain't gonna cop it" in a national TV campaign for United Australia Party. Twisted Sister condemned the unauthorised use of the song. Palmer disputed Twisted Sister's claim that they held any copyright over the portion of the song used in the advertisements, as he composed the lyrics and the melody was derived from "O Come, All Ye Faithful". In April 2021, Palmer was ordered by the Federal Court of Australia to pay $1.5 million dollars in damages for copyright infringement. Palmer was also ordered to pay legal costs and to remove all copies of the song and accompanying videos from the internet.

Through the release of the Epstein files, it was revealed that Palmer's campaign advertising strategy for the 2019 election was coordinated by Steve Bannon, former chief strategist to Donald Trump. Palmer initially denied the claims but later admitted to the influence and stated that he never again spoke to Bannon.

During the campaign for the 2020 Queensland state election, at which the United Australia Party endorsed 55 candidates, Palmer is estimated to have spent about $8 million in advertising. As in the 2019 federal election, the advertising mainly attacked the ALP, particularly alleging that Labor planned to impose a 20 per cent "death tax" to pay for its election promises, a claim that was dismissed by the ALP as a lie. No UAP candidates were elected.

In 2021, Palmer welcomed to his party Liberal Party defector Craig Kelly, an outspoken critic of scientific findings on climate change and on vaccines. Like Kelly, Palmer has been frequently criticised for spreading misinformation about COVID-19 and in particular the effectiveness of vaccines.

In December 2021, Palmer was rated Australia's "least likeable politician" in a Resolve Political Monitor survey that showed that only 8% of surveyed Australians had a positive view of him.

For the United Australia Party in the 2022 Australian federal election, Palmer spent $123.5 million, more than the expenditure of any other political party. The UAP obtained 4.7% of the vote, winning no seats in the House of Representatives and one in the Senate.

The UAP was voluntarily deregistered as a party on 8 September 2022, although its lone senator, Ralph Babet (Victoria), continues to say that he represents it.

In the last few weeks before the 2023 Australian Indigenous Voice referendum, Palmer was reported to have spent $2 million in advertisements for the No campaign.

In February 2025, the High Court ruled that Palmer could not register the United Australia Party again for the next federal election.

At a press conference on 19 February 2025, Palmer announced that he had joined Trumpet of Patriots, following the High Court ruling that he would be unable to register the United Australia Party (UAP) for the 2025 federal election after its voluntary de-registration in 2022. Palmer has announced that the party's policies are to be modelled on those of Donald Trump and that he plans to spend $90m on its campaign in the federal election of 2025.

Palmer spent approximately $60 million in the 2025 federal election on a nationwide advertising blitz, including over $6 million on YouTube and Meta Platforms, and sending over 17 million unsolicited text messages, the party failed to secure any seats in Parliament, garnering only 1.85% of the national vote. Following this defeat, Palmer announced his retirement from politics, citing his age and a desire to focus on philanthropic efforts.

In March 2026, Palmer announced that he would re-enter politics and become a candidate for the Queensland-based seat of Fadden at the next election.

== Financial problems ==
In March 2020, Palmer appeared in Brisbane Magistrates Court to answer four charges of fraud and other dishonesty, brought by the Australian Securities and Investments Commission (ASIC). The charges alleged improper transfers of money totalling several million dollars shortly before the 2013 general election, as fraud and dishonest use of Palmer's position as a company director (of Mineralogy) regarding funding of the Palmer United Party. Palmer denied that the charges relate to the collapse of Queensland Nickel, commenting: "It's just a fabricated charge which will be dismissed pretty easily which is what we do with ASIC charges which are political in nature." The case was adjourned until 28 August, with Palmer still claiming that the charges were "nonsense". Each offence carries a potential prison sentence of up to five years and, for the fraud charges, up to 12 years.

== Personal life ==
Palmer lives in a gated mansion on Sovereign Islands, an exclusive community on the Gold Coast. News Limited reports that property records reveal "Mr Palmer, his family and associates own a total of 11 homes in the Sovereign Islands, a gated enclave developed on reclaimed land on the banks of the Southport Broadwater." Palmer also owns homes at Broadbeach Waters on the Gold Coast, Fig Tree Pocket in Brisbane and in Sofia in Bulgaria. Other holdings include properties in Brisbane, Jandowae on the Darling Downs, Queensland, Port Douglas in Queensland and Bora Bora, French Polynesia. In addition, his wife owns an undisclosed number of properties held in trust. He was reported to have spent more than A$20m during 2018–19 on luxury homes on the Gold Coast and in Brisbane and Perth. As of August 2020, he reportedly owns three adjoining houses in Fig Tree Pocket, costing $17.5m and on more than four hectares of land fronting the Brisbane River.

Palmer was married to his first wife, Susan Palmer, for 22 years until she died from cancer in 2006. They had a son, Michael and a daughter, Emily. In 2007, Palmer married Anna, and they have two daughters, Mary and Lucy. Palmer is a Roman Catholic and was a prominent member of Right to Life Australia while at university, organising pro-life rallies on campus.

While watching a soccer game in October 2009, Palmer was thought to have suffered a heart attack, and was taken to hospital. However, doctors dismissed it as merely a heart palpitation. Palmer has also suffered from sleep apnoea. In February 2022 Palmer tested positive for COVID-19 and was diagnosed with pneumonia.

On 28 February 2022 it was reported that Palmer had purchased Adolf Hitler's Mercedes-Benz 770, and a Rolls-Royce once owned by King Edward VIII, to become part of a collection for a planned vintage car museum in Queensland.

=== Net worth ===
In 2016, the BRW Rich 200 estimated Palmer's net worth at A$600 million; by 2019 his net worth was assessed at A$4.09 billion; and in 2025 it was assessed at A$20.12 billion according to the Australian Financial Review 2025 Rich List.

Year	Financial Review Rich List		Forbes Australia's 50 Richest	
Year	Rank	Net worth (A$)	Rank	Net worth (US$)
2010	7	$3.92 billion		
2011	5 ▲	$5.05 billion ▲	n/a	not listed
2012	8 ▼	$3.85 billion ▼	29 ▲	$0.80 billion▲
2013	16 ▼	$2.20 billion ▼	31 ▼	
2014	28 ▼	$1.22 billion ▼	50 ▼	$0.55 billion ▼
2015	30 ▼	$1.40 billion ▲	n/a ▼	not listed ▼
2016	112 ▼	$0.57 billion ▼		
2017				
2018	20	$2.84 billion ▲		
2019	15 ▲	$4.09 billion ▲	20 ▲	$1.80 billion ▲
2020	8 ▲	$9.18 billion ▲		
2021	7 ▲	$13.01 billion ▲		
2022	7	$19.50 billion ▲		
2023	5 ▲	$23.60 billion ▲		
2024	6 ▼	$22.75 billion ▼		
2025	5 ▲	$20.12 billion ▼		

Legend
Icon	Description
Steady	Has not changed from the previous year
▲	Has increased from the previous year
▼	Has decreased from the previous year

=== Friendlyjordies and defamation case ===
In 2019, YouTuber friendlyjordies published a video satirising Palmer. Palmer began defamation action, but later withdrew it.

== See also ==
Parliament of Australia
Preceded by Alex Somlyay	Member for Fairfax; 2013–2016	Succeeded by Ted O'Brien
