= Te lapa =

Flashing light phenomenon seen below the ocean's surface

Te lapa is a Polynesian term for an unexplained light phenomenon underneath, or on the surface of, the ocean. Te lapa has been loosely translated as "flashing light", "underwater lightning", "the flashing", or "something that flashes". It is believed to have been used by historic Polynesians as a navigation aid to find islands in the Pacific Ocean, and remains a cultural practice to this day.

Very few first-hand accounts of Te Lapa exist, and the phenomenon has never been documented on camera.

== Possible natural causes ==
While Te Lapa is usually described as a psychic ability, it has been theorized that te lapa may be a natural phenomenon. In some instances, it has been theorized to be bioluminescence or electromagnetic in nature. Other hypotheses include the interference patterns of intersecting waves creating a raised curve acting as a lens, but would not explain the source of light. David Lewis speculated that te lapa may originate from luminescence of organisms, or related to deep swell, ground swell, or backwash waves from reefs or islands.

== History ==
Te lapa was brought to the attention of academia by David Lewis with the publication of his book We, the Navigators in 1972. The book dispelled the former academic belief that Polynesians colonized the islands haphazardly by drifting and without navigational aids. Lewis documented many non-instrumental methods used for navigation, most explainable by science except for te lapa. Later on in 1993, Marianne George would voyage with Lewis and together worked with Kaveia, a native of Taumako, to define the origin and nature of te lapa.

Eventually George would witness te lapa on several occasions with help from Kaveia. She described it as a natural phenomenon and used for piloting, best seen at night. The light is followed toward its origin from islands, or to reorient boat pilots at sea. Kaveia noted that te lapa is used for navigation no more than 120 miles (193 km) from shore, and rarely as close as 2 miles (3200 m) from shore due to the island already being visible from that distance. It is typically white in color, though its color may be dependent upon the makeup of the water. It was also described as having the shape of a straight line. Lewis, who had also seen the lights, described it as "streaking", "flickering", "flashes", "darts", "bolts", or "glowing plaques" but never as jagged, like lightning. Lewis noted that te lapa would travel slower farther out at sea, and faster when closer to shore, often having a "rapid to-and-fro jerking character." Lewis was instructed by Bongi, a native of Matema atoll, that te lapa was best seen 80 to 100 miles (129 to 161 km) from shore.

Other Polynesian cultures are likely to have different names for the same phenomenon. On the island of Nikunau it is referred to as "te mata" and "ulo aetahi" (Glory of the Seas). On Tonga, "ulo aetahi" may be "ulo a'e tahi" and have other names such as "te tapa" translated as "to burst forth with light." Lewis noted that Tikopians were unaware of te lapa.

George, who had been to sea and seen "ocean lights" from known sources many times, ruled out what te lapa was not. Ruled-out phenomena include: ball lightning, tektites, bioluminescence, luminescence, St. Elmo's fire, shooting stars/meteors, satellites, comets, unique colors visible at sunset or when the sun is occluded, celestial bodies, military firing ranges, fishing and military buoys, ice mirages, light mirroring, rainbows, glories, crepuscular rays, sun dogs, moon dogs, iceblink, looming from clouds, aurorae, asterisms, earthquake lights, and a large range of light shadowing, fractured lights, color, and mirage arcs from light phenomenon above 60° latitude. George also mentioned that Kaveia interpreted other known and explained phenomena, as well as other unexplained phenomena such as "Te Akua" also known as "the devil lights".

== Skepticism ==
Richard Feinberg, a Kent State University professor, has, however, claimed that the phenomenon has not been scientifically written about, that there are few references to it, and that there are disagreements among sailors about how the phenomenon operates. Still, Feinberg interviewed sailors who believed in te lapa and said that they used it to navigate. He concluded his publication on te lapa with the remark "[a]lthough I am not quite ready dismiss te lapa out of hand, it is hard to see how a phenomenon so rare and difficult to find could be a dependable navigational tool, particularly in an emergency situation—precisely when it would be needed."
