= Marumaru Atua =

Polynesian voyaging canoe

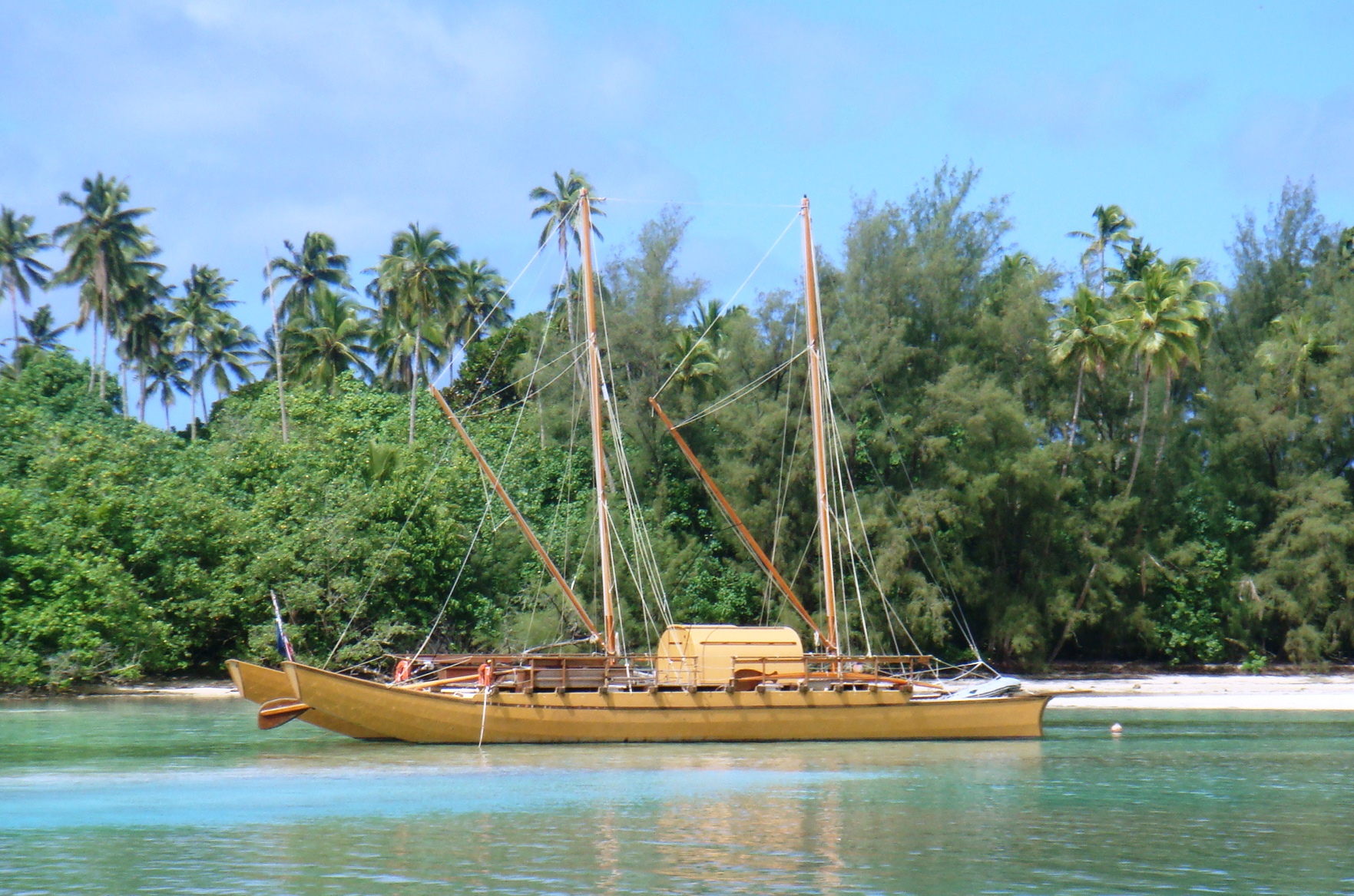
- Marumaru Atua, Rarotonga 2010

History

Cook Islands
- Name: Marumaru Atua
- Owner: Cook Islands Voyaging Society
- Builder: Salthouse Boatbuilders
- Launched: 2009
- Identification: MMSI number: 518350000; Callsign: E5U2300
- Status: Active

General characteristics
- Class & type: Vaka Moana
- Displacement: 13 tonnes
- Length: 72 ft (22 m) overall
- Beam: 21 ft (6.4 m)
- Draft: 3 ft (0.91 m)
- Propulsion: Sail / PV electric
- Sail plan: crabclaw sails
- Complement: 18

Marumaru Atua ("under the protection of God") is a reconstruction of a vaka moana, a double-hulled Polynesian voyaging canoe. It was built in 2009 by the Okeanos Foundation for the Sea. In 2014, it was gifted to the Cook Islands Voyaging Society. It is used to teach polynesian navigation.

The vaka is recognised as a cultural treasure and is commemorated on the Cook Islands $5 coin.

== Construction ==
The vaka hulls are constructed of fiberglass, The wood beams are connected to the hulls with traditional lashings. The two masts are rigged with crab claw sails, with bermuda rigged sails for safety during long voyages. It is fitted with a 1 kW photovoltaic array powering a 4 kW electric motor. It was constructed at Salthouse Boatbuilders in Auckland, New Zealand. The starboard hull is named Pa Tuterangi Ariki and has a bowspirit carved with the sun, Te Ra, as a tribute to former Cook Islands Prime Minister and Polynesian navigator Tom Davis. The port hull is named Te Tika O Te Tuaine and has a bowspirit carved with the moon, Te Marama, as a tribute to Te Tika Mataiapo Dorice Reid, who had sailed with the Cook Islands Voyaging Society on its earlier vaka, Te Au o Tonga.

== Voyages ==
In April 2010, Marumaru Atua was part of a fleet of four vaka which voyaged from New Zealand to the island of Raivavae in French Polynesia. It then sailed to Raiatea - sometimes identified with the Polynesian homeland of hawaiki - then on to Rarotonga, Samoa, Tonga and Fiji.

In 2011, it visited San Francisco as part of a fleet of six traditional canoes which voyaged across the Pacific to the USA.

From 2011 to 2012, it was part of the Te Mana o Te Moana (Spirit of the Ocean) fleet which visited 15 Pacific nations to spread knowledge of voyaging culture and advocate for ocean conservation.

In September 2014, it journeyed to Sydney, Australia as part of a fleet to mark the World parks Congress in November. It was later joined by canoes from Samoa and Fiji. It then sailed to New Zealand, where after refurbishment in Auckland, it participated in Waitangi Day celebrations.

It returned to the Cook Islands in May 2015 to join the Te Manava Vaka Festival, organised to mark the Cook Island's 50th anniversary of self-rule.

In September 2017, the vaka was damaged by a fire and was shipped to New Zealand for repairs. The entire starboard hull was replaced. The repair was funded by the Cook Islands government, a $135,000 donation from US NGO Nia Tero, and a crowdfunding campaign from the Cook Island Voyaging Society. It returned to Rarotonga in June 2019.

In October 2019, it was borrowed by the Ministry of Marine Resources for a trip to Manuae and Takutea to survey marine life.

In December 2019, it voyaged to Aitutaki.

In 2020, the vaka had planned to voyage to Hawaii.

In August 2020, it voyaged to Mangaia for the first time for the inauguration of the Numangatini Ariki.

In June 2021, it set out to visit all 15 of the Cook Islands.

== Images ==
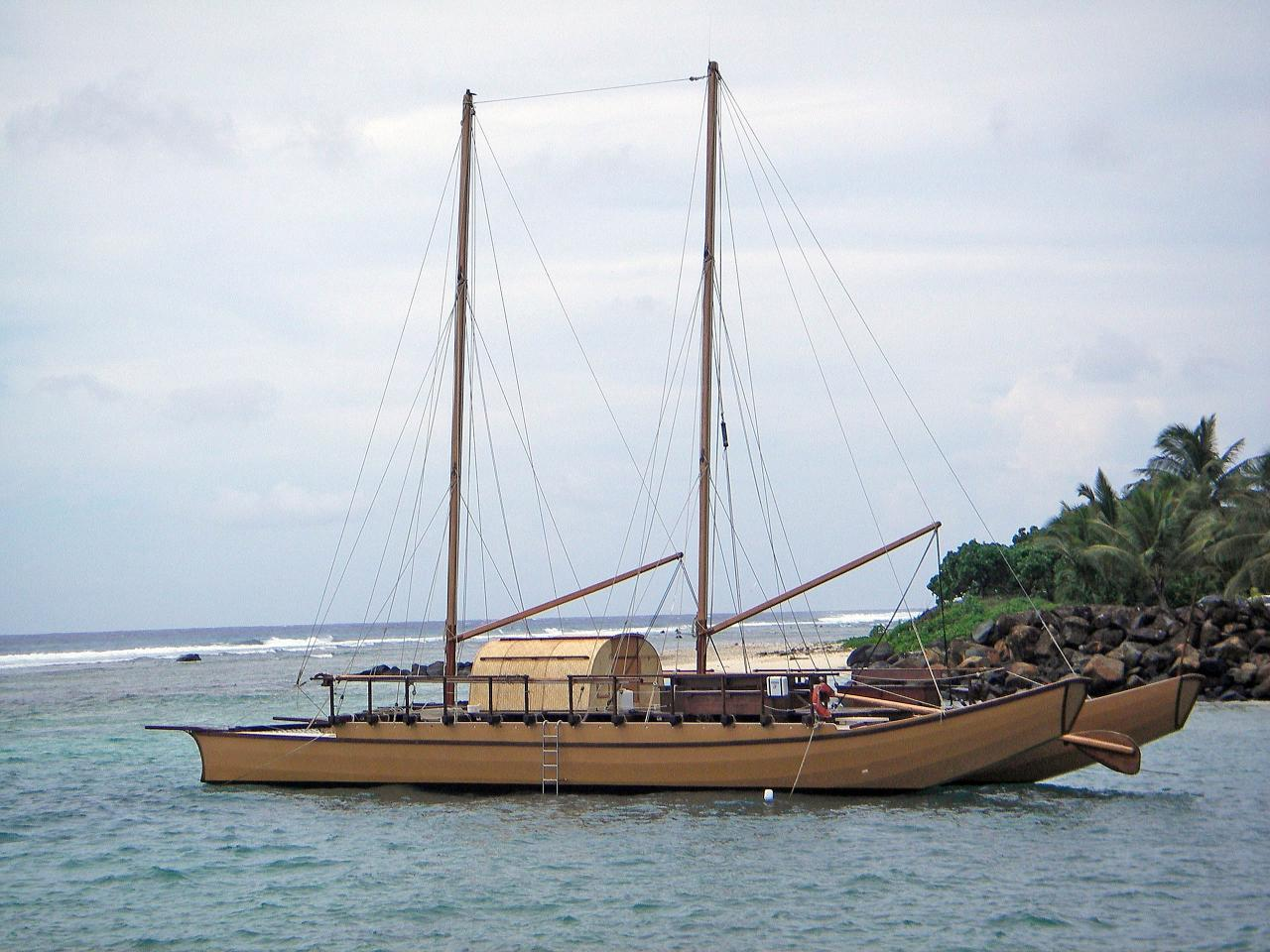
Marumaru Atua in Avarua harbour, 2011

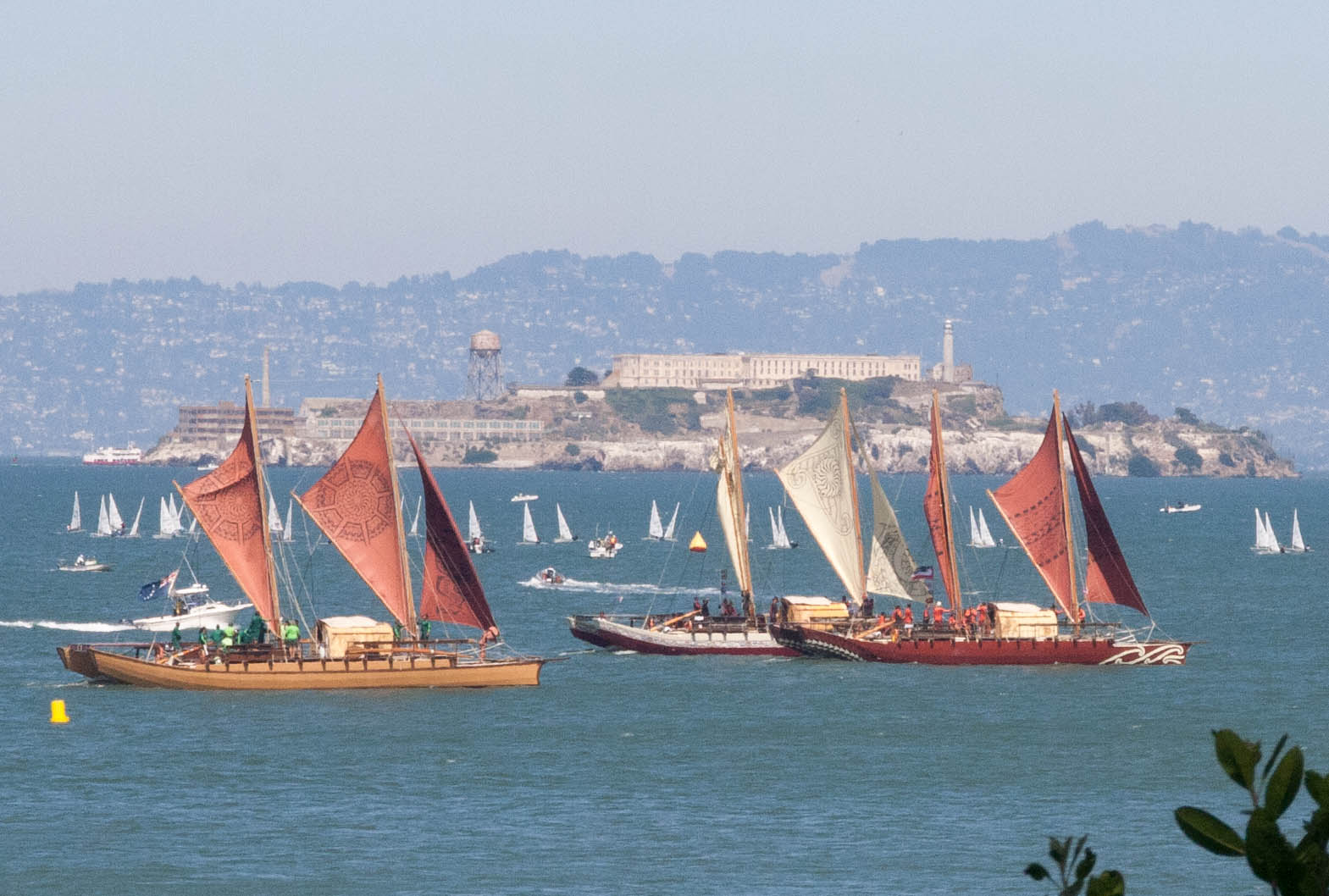
Voyaging canoes (left to right) - Marumaru Atua, Hine Moana, and Haunui - arriving in San Francisco in the Te Mana o Te Moana expedition (2011)

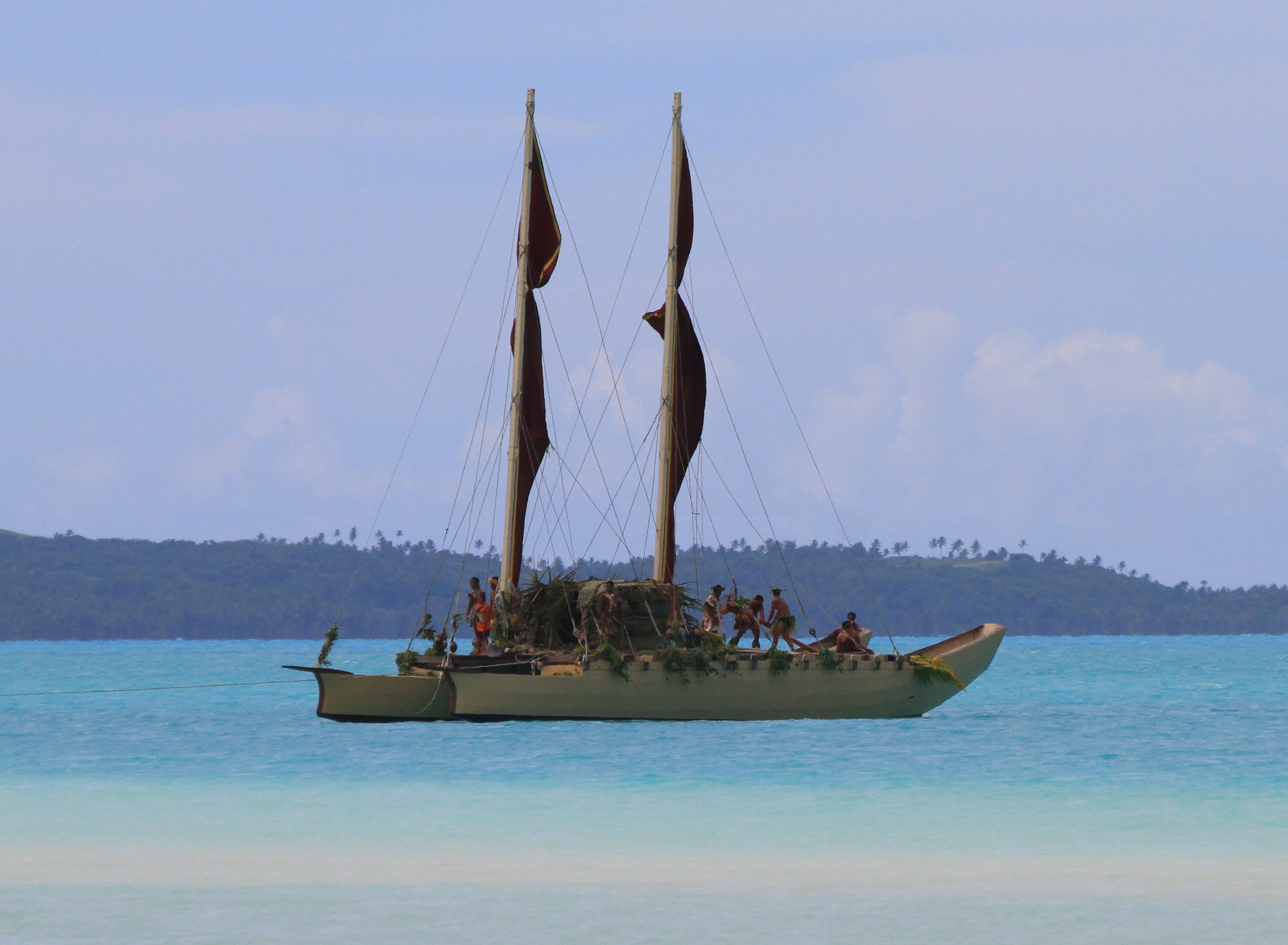
Marumaru Atua in 2013

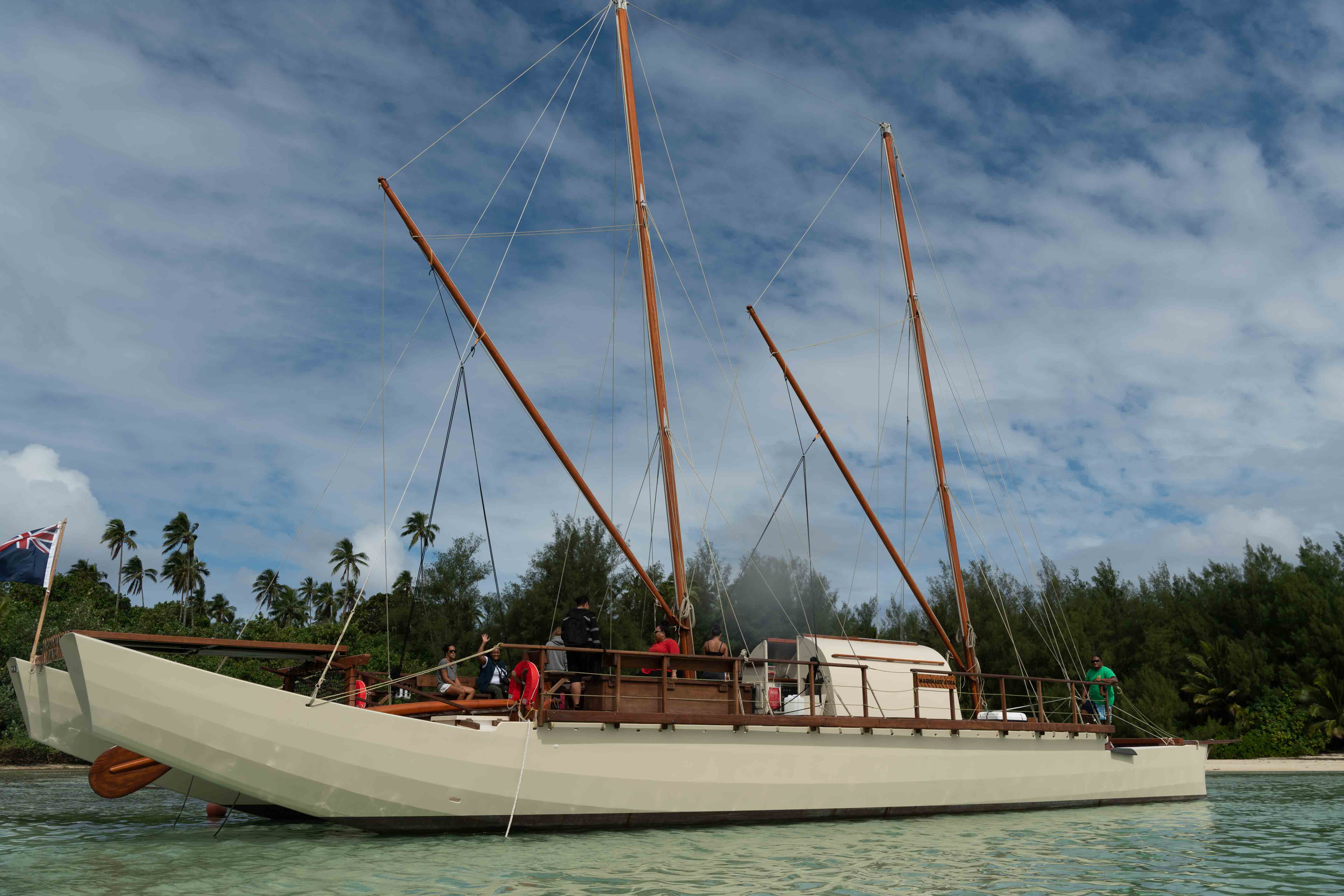
Marumaru Atua in August 2019

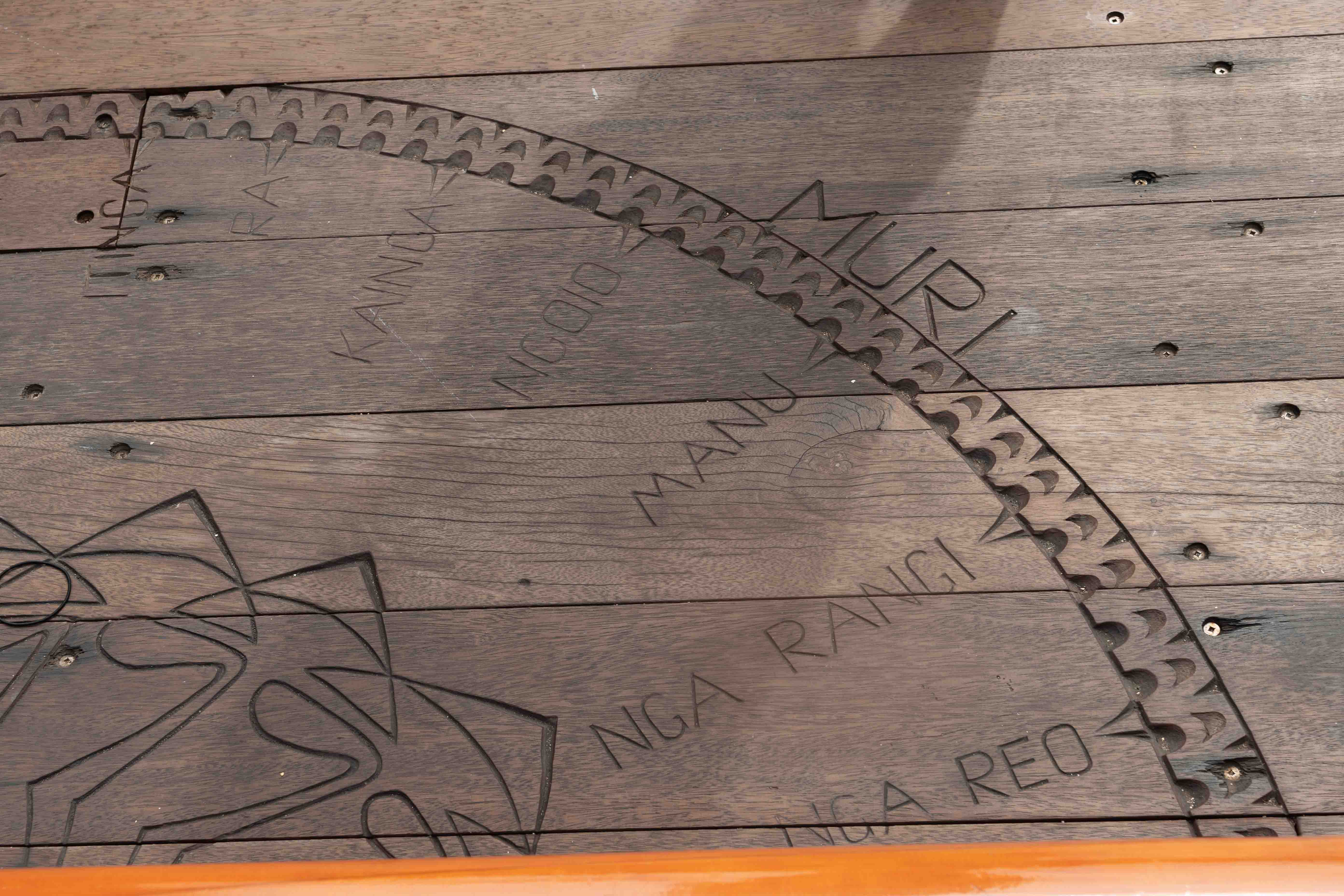
Marumaru Atua's navigation carving
