= Kakiaba =

High Chief of Makin and Butaritari
- Reign: 18th century
- Predecessor: Na Atanga
- Successor: Nan Tetabakea
- Issue: 6, including Nan Tetabakea
- Father: Na Atanga

Kakiaba was the second high chief of Makin and Butaritari in the Gilbert Islands, in what is now Kiribati, according to oral tradition. He reigned during the 18th century. Kakiaba spent much of his time relaxing on Bikaati, an isolated islet of Butaritari, and neglected affairs on the mainland. A slave rebellion was able to take hold, and although his firstborn son, Bunatao, defeated the rebels, his wives and most of his children were slain. A war of succession broke out between Bunatao and his two surviving brothers, with whom Kakiaba sided, but Bunatao ultimately accepted a truce and abandoned his claim to the chieftainship.

== Pre-reign ==
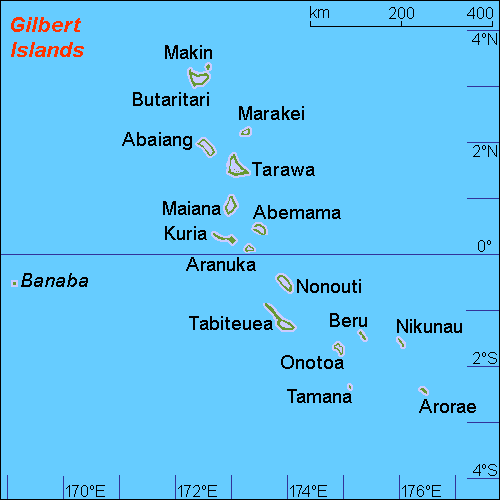
Gilbert Islands

According to oral tradition, Kakiaba was the second child of Na Atanga, (Note: In the Gilbertese language of Kiribati, personal articles are sometimes used before names. A personal article is usually used when the name is also a word in its own right, e.g. atanga can also mean an "upper plank in a canoe." In the Makin–Butaritari dialect, the masculine personal articles, i.e. those used before the names of males, are Na, Nan, Nam and Nang. The variant used depends on the sound that the name begins with. Outside of Makin and Butaritari, the articles Te, Ten, Tem, and Teng are used. The feminine personal article, i.e. the article used before the names of females, is Nei. It is the same in all dialects of Gilbertese.) who became the first high chief of Butaritari and Makin, in the Gilbert Islands (in what is now Kiribati), during the 17th century. He had an elder brother named Kourabi and a younger sister named Nei Mauriteuea. Kambati K. Uriam, an I-Kiribati reverend and historian, approximated Kakiaba's birth to 1690 based on his genealogy. (Note: Uriam assumed an approximate birthdate of 1900 for Na Kaiea II, a direct descendant of Kakiaba, and estimated that each generation in an I-Kiribati genealogy lasted 30 years. Kakiaba lived seven generations before Na Kaiea II, so he would have been born around 1690.) The British colonial administrator and anthropologist Arthur Grimble recorded an oral tradition recounted to him by Nei Biria (2019) of Butaritari; it contains information on Kakiaba. Uriam regarded Nei Biria's account as one of the major traditions that may be accepted to contain reliable historical information. In addition to this, a written collection of tales prepared for Na Kaiea II, the twelfth high chief of Makin and Butaritari, in the 1950s provides details on the five earliest high chiefs.

According to Nei Biria, Kakiaba lived at Tebukintake, a place on Butaritari, with his numerous wives and followers. In contrast, Kourabi was unpopular with women and few cared to live at his settlement at Tongaieta. Out of envy, Kourabi waged an unsuccessful war on Kakiaba before fleeing to Abaiang, where his descendants still live. (Note: According to Grimble, Na Atanga was the progenitor of a chiefly dynasty on Abaiang as well. This dynasty was extant at the time Grimble was writing, in 1933.) Although the eldest son typically inherited the chieftainship, Kakiaba, the second-eldest son, succeeded his father as high chief in his elder brother's absence.

== Reign ==
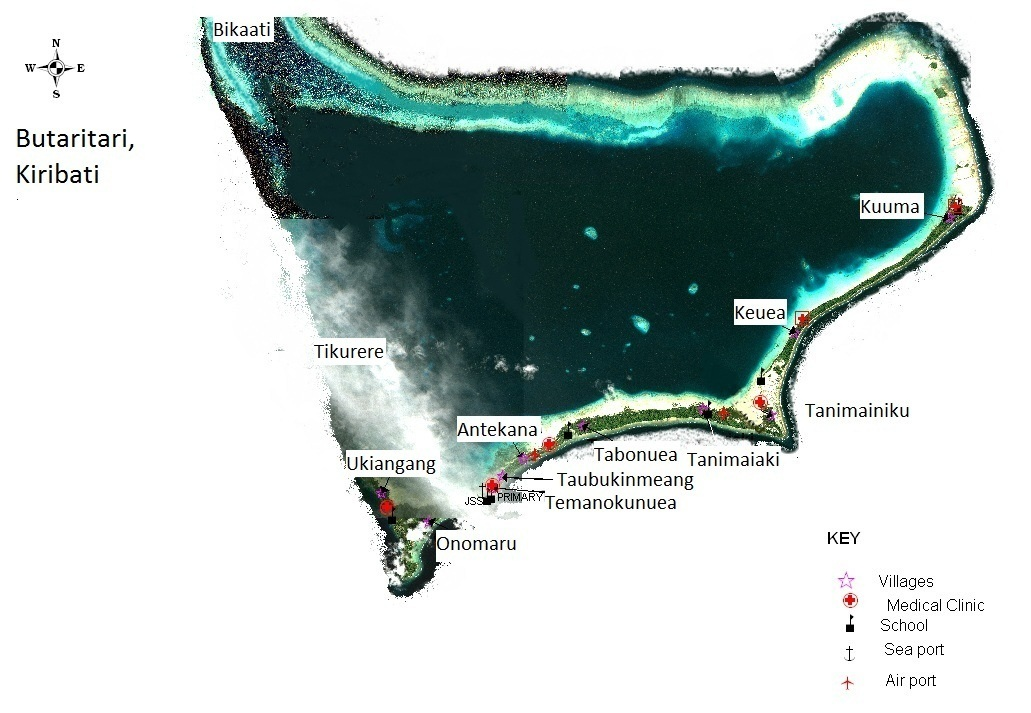
Butaritari, 2012. At the time Kakiaba lived, the main village of Butaritari had the same name as the island. This village is not shown on this map because it was later divided into several different villages, including Antekana, Taubukinmeang and Temanokunuea.

The following details come from Nei Biria's account. After Kakiaba acceded to the chieftainship, his eldest son, Bunatao, decided to consolidate power. Bunatao wiped out the subordinate chiefly families of Makin and the villages of Kuma, Keuea, and Tanimaiaki on Butaritari. Na Atanga had given the progenitors of these four families these lands in return for their aid in conquering Makin and Butaritari. Bunatao spared Tebai and Mataianti, two Kuma chiefs who alone knew the magic connected to male initiation rites, but killed all the others, including the children. After the purge, Bunatao settled on Makin, while Kakiaba and his six other children continued to live on Butaritari.

Kakiaba spent long periods on Bikaati, an isolated islet of Butaritari which was his favourite resting place. As he grew older, he increasingly neglected the affairs of the mainland. While he was away, an enslaved man (Note: On Makin and Butaritari, people who did not have land were dependent on their lord for food and had to catch fish, prepare food and perform other menial tasks for him. The American anthropologist Bernd Lambert described them as being in a state of "near-slavery".) named Itinua took the opportunity to stage a revolt. He and his fellow slaves stormed the main village of Butaritari (which shared its name with the island) and killed Kakiaba's wives, along with four of his children. Two of his sons, Nan Tetabakea and Nan Teitibonuea, survived because some of the rebels adopted them and concealed them from their allies. The rebels controlled the entire mainland, while Kakiaba remained on Bikaati in fear of his life.

When Bunatao found out about the massacre, he and all of his followers on Makin departed for Butaritari. Arriving at Keuea, he met Itinua in the village maneaba (meeting house), but both sides were unprepared for battle and merely exchanged a few words. Bunatao sailed southwest to the village of Butaritari and sent messengers south to Ukiangang. Within 12 hours, he had mustered his forces. After executing all the relatives of Itinua he could find in the villages of Butaritari and Ukiangang, he marched north. Meanwhile, Itinua hastily assembled his own forces and advanced south from Keuea. Clashing with Itinua's forces in northern Tanimaiaki, Bunatao emerged victorious and executed all of Itinua's remaining relatives.

== Post-reign ==
After Bunatao defeated the rebels, Kakiaba asked him to stay on Butaritari and succeed him as high chief. However, Bunatao preferred Makin to Butaritari. He returned to being a subordinate ruler on Makin, relinquishing the chieftainship of both islands to one of his brothers. In Nei Biria's telling, this brother was Nan Teitibonuea, but Bernd Lambert, an American anthropologist who had access to Na Kaiea II's compilation and counted two of its contributors as informants, stated that Nan Tetabakea was the third high chief. (Note: Nei Biria's account has another omission. Although she stated that the seventh high chief, Na Kaiea I, was directly succeeded by his brother Na Bureimoa, he was actually succeeded by Nan Teitei, another brother. Nan Teitei was succeeded by Nam Bakatokia, who was then succeeded by Na Bureimoa.) Both agree that Nan Teauoki, the son of Nan Teitibonuea, was the fourth; Lambert explained how Nan Teauoki had seized power from Nan Tetabakea's side of the family because Nan Tetabakea favored him and helped Nan Teauoki kill his own sons.

According to Nei Biria, Bunatao began to grow jealous of the new high chief despite having given up the title of his own accord. After seeing the people of Makin make offerings of food to the high chief, (Note: The people regularly offered up a portion of their produce to the high chief as confirmation of his legitimacy. Custom dictated that the high chief give most of it away again, redistributing it among his subjects.) Bunatao was so aggravated that he intended to attack his brothers. After Kakiaba travelled to Makin to dissuade him, (Note: Violence during the succession wars of Makin and Butaritari was confined to the generation of potential successors. Even when a parent took a side, he or she was never attacked.) Bunatao agreed to conquer Marakei instead, but he ended up recruiting the warriors he found on Marakei instead of fighting them. A fleet of canoes, led by Bunatao, (Note: Lambert wrote: "One dispossessed heir [to the high chieftainship of Makin and Butaritari] attacked Butaritari with a troop from the island of Marakei, but, perhaps out of shame for employing these 'mercenaries', disguised himself by blackening his face and cutting off his hair.") was soon spotted approaching Butaritari. (Note: According to Nei Biria, Bunatao's fleet were making for a place on Butaritari known as Nakiroro. In We, the Navigators (1972), David Lewis wrote that Nakiroro as a place that Kakiaba traveled to when he was high chief. Lewis cited "Kings of Butaritari and Makin" (1938), an unpublished manuscript of an oral tradition recorded by Grimble, which H. E. Maude had provided to Lewis. According to Lewis, Maude had identified Mili Atoll, in the Marshall Islands, as the likeliest match for Nakiroro.) Warriors assembled on the shoal to prevent the invaders from landing, and a violent battle unfolded in the shallows which were known as Tebikenimone. Both sides fought to exhaustion, and the fighting ceased when Bunatao accepted a truce proposed by his father and brothers. After sending his surviving men back to Marakei, Bunatao lived peacefully on Butaritari and later returned to Makin. (Note: In one of Lambert's genealogies, he indicated that Bunatao had a son, Rairaueana the Pandanus Branch, who he classified under "Unsuccessful pretenders and other rebels".)

== Bibliography ==
- Grimble, Arthur (1933). Migrations of a Pandanus People. no. 2. Polynesian Society. pp. 51–84. JSTOR 20702527.
- Lambert, Bernd (1963). Rank and Ramage in the Northern Gilbert Islands (PhD thesis). University of California, Berkeley.
- Lambert, Bernd (1978). "Uean abara: the high chiefs of Butaritari and Makin as kinsmen and office-bearers". In Gunson, Neil (ed.). The Changing Pacific. Oxford University Press. pp. 80–93. ISBN 978-0-19-550518-4.
- Lewis, David (1972). We, the Navigators. ANU Press. ISBN 0708103960.
- Nei Biria (2019) [1989]. "Settlement of Butaritari by Rairaueana". Tungaru Traditions. University of Hawaiʻi Press. pp. 99–105.
- Trussel, Stephen (1979). "The Article: Lesson 14" (PDF). Kiribati (Gilbertese): Grammar Handbook. Peace Corps. pp. 87–95.
- Trussel, Stephen; Groves, Gordon W. (2003) [1978]. "atanga". A Combined Kiribati-English Dictionary.
- Uriam, Kambati K. (1995). In Their Own Words: History and Society in Gilbertese Oral Tradition. The Journal of Pacific History. ISBN 0959547770.
