= Te Au o Tonga =

Te Au o Tonga ("the mist of the South") is a reconstruction of a vaka moana, a double-hulled Polynesian voyaging canoe. It was built in 1994 by former Cook Islands Prime Minister Thomas Davis and the Cook Islands Voyaging Society. It was used to teach polynesian navigation.

The vaka is made of laminated wood, 72 feet long, with a displacement of 10 to 12 tons, and a crew of 18. It has inspired other designs, being used by the Okeanos Foundation for the Sea as a model for a group of fibreglass-hulled replicas, including Marumaru Atua, and later by the Te Aurere Voyaging Society in New Zealand as a model for their kauri-hulled Te Aurere. It has also featured in the filmThe Legend of Johnny Lingo.

Since 2002 the vaka has been based in Aitutaki. In 2012 it completed a refit, with repairs to the hull and crossbeams. In 2014 it completed a further refit, which replaced the hull, decks, and spars. It is currently used for training and tourism trips in the Aitutaki lagoon.

== Voyages ==
- In 1995 Te Au o Tonga made an inaugural voyage to Raiatea, Tahiti, Nuku Hiva, Hawaii, Molokai and Oahu.
- In August 1995 it sailed as part of a protest fleet against a resumption of French nuclear testing at Moruroa.
- In 1996 it sailed to Samoa for the VII Pacific Arts Festival, and then to Tonga and New Zealand.
- In 1999 it sailed to Auckland, New Zealand, for the opening of the Americas's Cup challenge, and then on to Gisborne for the Millennium celebrations. It later returned to Auckland for the America's Cup regatta.
- In 2002 it sailed to Tahiti, Huahine, Raiatea, Tahaa, Borabora, and Mitiaro.
- In July 2008 it sailed to American Samoa for the Festival of Pacific Arts.
