= Thomas Davis (Cook Islands politician) =

Prime minister of the Cook Islands (1978–83, 1983–87)

Sir Thomas Davis KBE
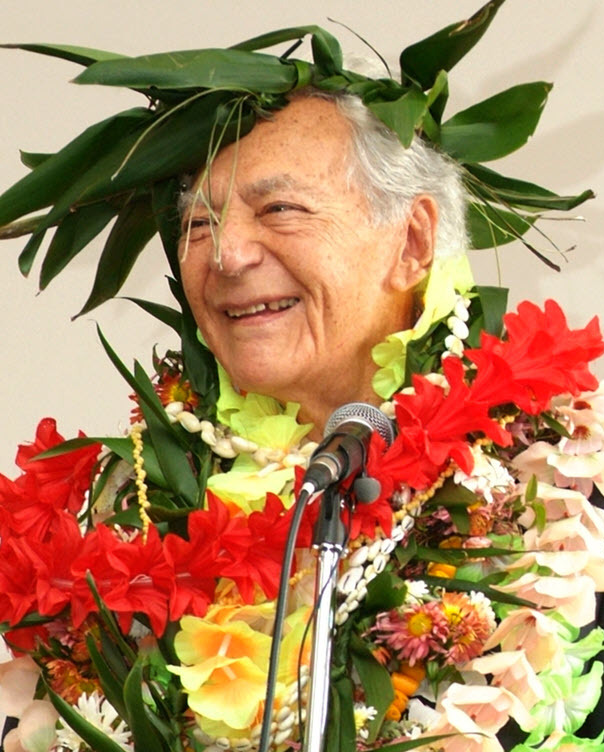
- Davis in 2005

2nd and 4th Prime Minister of the Cook Islands
- In office 16 November 1983 – 29 July 1987
- Monarch: Elizabeth II
- Deputy: Geoffrey Henry; Terepai Maoate
- Queen's Representative: Sir Gaven Donne; Graham Speight (Acting); Sir Tangaroa Tangaroa
- Preceded by: Geoffrey Henry
- Succeeded by: Pupuke Robati
- In office 25 July 1978 – 13 April 1983
- Monarch: Elizabeth II
- Deputy: Pupuke Robati
- Queen's Representative: Sir Gavin Donne
- Preceded by: Albert Henry
- Succeeded by: Geoffrey Henry

Personal details
- Born: Thomas Robert Alexander Harries Davis; 11 June 1917 Rarotonga, Cook Islands
- Died: 23 July 2007 (aged 90) Rarotonga, Cook Islands
- Party: Democratic Party
- Spouse(s): Lydia Davis; Pa Tepaeru Terito Ariki; Carla Cassata
- Education: University of Sydney, Australia; Harvard University, United States; University of Otago, New Zealand
- Occupation: Physiologist, politician

Sir Thomas Robert Alexander Harries Davis KBE (11 June 1917 – 23 July 2007) was a Cook Islands statesman, politician, sailor and medical researcher. He served as Prime Minister of the Cook Islands from 1978 to March 1983, and again from November 1983 to July 1987. He also worked as a medical officer, and as a medical researcher for the US Army and NASA. He was a founder of the Cook Islands Voyaging Society and constructed and voyaged in several replica vaka, including Tākitumu and Te Au o Tonga.

== Early life and education ==
Davis was born on the island of Rarotonga and educated at King's College, Auckland. He was the first Cook Islands medical graduate in New Zealand, finishing his studies at the University of Otago in 1945. He applied for the position of Medical Officer in the Cook Islands, and after multiple rejections due to racism from colonial officials, was eventually appointed. As Medical Officer, he reorganised the country's health system, establishing a nursing school and taking measures to control tuberculosis. In 1948, after completing a post-graduate course in tropical medicine at the University of Sydney, he was appointed Chief Medical Officer.

In 1952, he was invited to study at Harvard University in the United States. He made the journey with his wife and children in a yacht, via Peru and the Panama Canal. The journey was documented by his wife, Lydia Davis, in a series of articles published in New Zealand newspapers. She reported that they were "welcomed at Boston like heroes".

At Harvard Davis completed a Master of Public Health, before joining the United States Department of Nutrition and working for the US armed forces. In 1958 he was appointed Director of the Division of Environmental Medicine at the US Army's Fort Knox medical research laboratory. He later joined NASA to work on the space programme before working for Arthur D. Little (a consulting firm) as a research physician.

== Political career ==
Davis returned to the Cook Islands in 1971 to enter politics. He founded the Cook Islands Democratic Party in 1971, and was elected to the Legislative Assembly at the 1972 election, becoming leader of the opposition. He was proposed as Vice-Chancellor of the University of the South Pacific in 1974, ultimately losing to James Maraj. He was re-elected to the Assembly in the 1974 election.

He initially lost his seat in the 1978 election, but was reinstated after an election petition found that Prime Minister Albert Henry had corruptly used government money to fly in voters and secure a majority. Davis was subsequently asked to form a government and was sworn in as Prime Minister. One of his first actions as Prime Minister was to ban Czech-born "cancer therapist" Milan Brych from Rarotonga hospital and bar him from returning to the Cook Islands. As Prime Minister he pursued economic independence, reduced the government deficit, and unsuccessfully explored joining the Lomé Convention to obtain aid from the European Economic Community.

In 1979, he replaced the old flag of the Cook Islands of 15 yellow stars on a green background with the Cook Islands Blue Ensign. In 1982, "Te Atua Mou E" was adopted as the national anthem of the Cook Islands, replacing "God Defend New Zealand". Davis wrote the music to "Te Atua Mou E" and his wife wrote the lyrics.

After being defeated in the March 1983 election, Davis became leader of the opposition again. The defection of cabinet minister Tapui Henry from the government six months later forced a second election, which returned Davis to power. In 1984, the defection of Vincent Ingram forced Davis' democrats into an uncomfortable coalition with the Cook Islands Party under Geoffrey Henry. Henry subsequently left the coalition, but five MPs remained, providing Davis with a majority.

In 1985 at a South Pacific Forum meeting he announced, mostly to gain local electoral kudos and in "bone-headed stupidity", that the Cook Islands would reconsider the relationship with New Zealand. NZ Prime Minister David Lange, who disliked Davis, then said if the Cook Islands wanted independence, he would cut aid and remove New Zealand citizenship rights. Lange also said "We can probably throw in a second-hand Orion at a knock down rate so you can do your own maritime surveillance." Following the collapse of ANZUS over New Zealand's anti-nuclear policy, Davis declared the Cook Islands' neutrality as New Zealand would be unable to defend it. Davis subsequently opposed a New Zealand offer to hold military exercises in the Cook Islands to demonstrate its ability, but his opposition was overturned by Cabinet.

On 3 August 1986 Davis became the first head of government to formally consult with the Universal House of Justice, the supreme governing institution of the Baháʼí Faith.

He was ousted as Prime Minister on 29 July 1987 after failing three times to pass a budget through Parliament. He resigned as Democratic Party leader after losing his seat in parliament at the 1994 election.

After leaving politics, Davis advocated for a Polynesian Economic Community. In 2004, he was appointed the Cook Islands' High Commissioner to New Zealand.

== Personal life ==
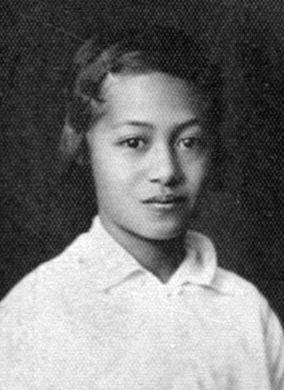
Davis's second wife, Pa Tepaeru Terito Ariki, as a child in 1934

Davis co-authored the autobiographical Doctor to the Islands (1955) and the novel Makutu (1960) with his first wife, New Zealander Lydia Davis. After divorcing her in June 1978, he married Pa Tepaeru Terito Ariki, the paramount chief of the Takitumu tribe in the Cook Islands, in 1979. She had nine children, three boys and six girls, from a previous marriage to George Ani Rima Peyroux. Pa Terito had become a Baháʼí in the 1950s; sometime after 1986, Davis joined the Baháʼí Faith. In 2000, Davis married for a third time, to American Carla Cassata, but they separated ten months before his death.

Davis was a keen sailor since childhood and was interested in Polynesian navigation. In 1992, he built a replica of the vaka Tākitumu for the 6th Festival of Pacific Arts. he later sailed it to Tahiti. He was a founder of the Cook Islands Voyaging Society and in 1994 led the design and construction of the vaka Te Au o Tonga, which he then sailed to Samoa. In 1998 he sailed aboard Nokia in the 1998 Sydney to Hobart Yacht Race.

Davis died in 2007 in Rarotonga, aged 90.

== Honours and awards ==
In 1977, Davis was awarded the Queen Elizabeth II Silver Jubilee Medal. He was appointed a Knight Commander of the Order of the British Empire, for services to medicine and the people of the Cook Islands, in the 1981 New Year Honours. The University of Otago awarded him an honorary Doctor of Laws degree in 2005.
