= Nan Tetabakea =

High Chief of Makin and Butaritari
- Reign: 18th century
- Predecessor: Kakiaba
- Successor: Nan Teauoki
- Issue: Na Kautuntebuka; Nan Teakamatang; Nei Tebabuti and others
- Father: Kakiaba

Nan Tetabakea (Note: Lambert (1963) spelled the name "Nan Tetab'akea", which indicates that the b is velarised. In the modern orthography, the name would be written as "Nan Tetabwakea".) was the third high chief of Makin and Butaritari in the Gilbert Islands. According to oral tradition, Nan Tetabakea was a son of Kakiaba, the second high chief, and succeeded him after Bunatao, his elder brother, relinquished his claim to the high chieftainship. He reigned during the 18th century.

When Nan Tetabakea grew old and fell ill, Nan Teauoki, his nephew, took care of him and allowed him to sleep with his wives. In return, Nan Tetabakea supported Nan Teauoki in pursuing the high chieftainship. With Nan Tetabakea's approval, Nan Teauoki killed each of his sons—Nan Teauoki's cousins—until he had eliminated all other contenders to the high chieftainship. When Nan Tetabakea died, Nan Teauoki became the new high chief.

== Sources ==
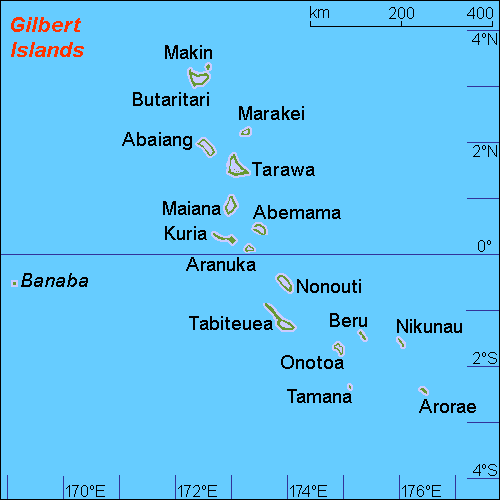
Gilbert Islands

A compilation of oral tradition, Ana Boki ni Karaki Na Kaeia (Na Kaiea's Book of Stories), was prepared for Na Kaiea II, (Note: In the Gilbertese language, personal articles are sometimes used before names. For males, the articles Na, Nan, Nam and Nang are used in the Butaritari–Makin dialect. On other islands, the articles Te, Ten, Tem or Teng are used instead. Which variant is used depends on the letter that the name starts with. For females, the article is Nei and is the same for all dialects. Personal articles are most often used when the name is also a word in Gilbertese, e.g. Tetabakea also refers to a style of maneaba.) the twelfth high chief of Makin and Butaritari in the Gilbert Islands (in what is now Kiribati), in the 1950s. The book contains extensive information on the five earliest high chiefs. Bernd Lambert, an American anthropologist who wrote about the social organisation of Makin and Butaritari, had access to this book and to two of its contributors.

Arthur Grimble recorded another oral tradition from Butaritari, Nei Biria's "Settlement of Butaritari by Rairaueana", that mentions Nan Tetabakea. It was published in Grimble's Tungaru Traditions (1989). Kambati K. Uriam, an I-Kiribati reverend who studied I-Kiribati oral tradition, wrote that Nei Biria's account was one of the major traditions that might be accepted as containing reliable historical information.

== Life ==
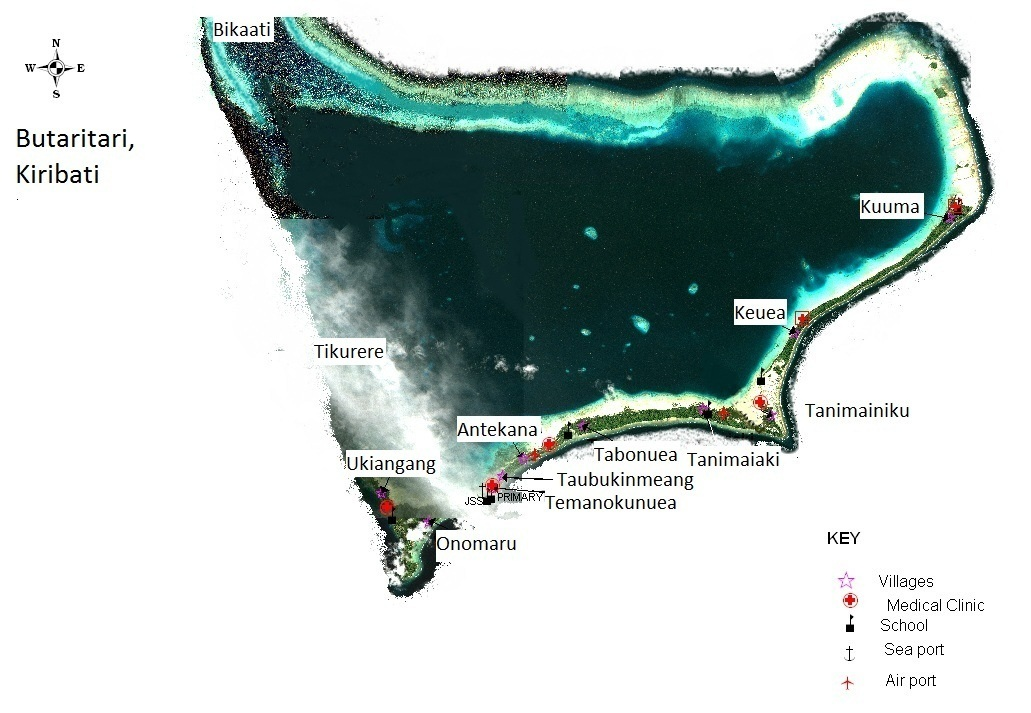
Butaritari, 2012. At the time Kakiaba lived, the main village of Butaritari had the same name as the island. This village is not shown on this map because it was later divided into several different villages, including Antekana, Taubukinmeang and Temanokunuea.

Based on genealogical information, Nan Tetabakea reigned during the 18th century. (Note: Based on genealogical information, Uriam estimated that Kakiaba, Nan Tetabakea's father, was born c. 1690 and Nan Teitibonuea, Nan Tetabakea's younger brother, was born c. 1720. Lambert considered it probable that Nan Teauoki, the successor of Nan Tetabakea, reigned during the last quarter of the 18th century, based on the length of the genealogies and the fact that his grandson was reigning when the United States Exploring Expedition charted Makin and Butaritari in 1841.) According to Nei Biria, he was one of seven children of Kakiaba, the second high chief of Makin and Butaritari. While Kakiaba was sojourning on Bikaati, rebels stormed the main village of Butaritari (which shared its name with the island), killing his wives and four of his children. Nan Tetabakea and his younger brother, Nan Teitibonuea, survived because some of the rebels adopted them and concealed them from the others.

Bunatao, Kakiaba's eldest son and his subordinate on Makin, rushed to Butaritari when he heard the news and defeated the rebels. Afterwards, Kakiaba offered Bunatao the high chieftainship, but Bunatao preferred Makin to Butaritari and gave up his claim to the high chieftainship by patrilineal primogeniture. Kakiaba instead abdicated in favour of one of Bunatao's younger brothers. Although Nei Biria said that this brother was Nan Teitibonuea, Na Kaiea II's book, per Lambert, stated that Nan Tetabakea was the third high chief. (Note: Nei Biria's account has another omission. Although she states that Na Bureimoa succeeded his brother, Na Kaiea I, directly, Na Kaiea I was actually succeeded by his other brother Nan Teitei, who was then succeeded by their brother Nam Bakatokia, before Na Bureimoa came to power.)

Nei Biria's account continues with Bunatao becoming jealous of the new high chief and deciding to wage war on his brothers. After recruiting warriors from Marakei, Bunatao attacked Butaritari. Both sides fought to exhaustion without a clear result, and Bunatao's father and brothers proposed a truce, which he accepted. Afterwards, Bunatao lived at peace with his father and brothers and later returned to Makin. (Note: In one of Lambert's genealogies, he indicated that Bunatao had a son, Rairaueana the Pandanus Branch, who he classified under "Unsuccessful pretenders and other rebels".)

According to Lambert, Nan Tetabakea had numerous children, including Na Kautuntebuke, his eldest son; Nan Teakamatang; and Nei Tebabuti, who married Nam Manarara, one of Nan Teitibonuea's sons. Lambert, citing Na Kaiea II's compilation, described how the high chieftainship passed from Nan Tetabakea to Nan Teitibonuea's side of the family. When Nan Tetabakea grew old and fell ill, Nan Teitibonuea told Nan Teauoki, his eldest son and Nan Tetabakea's nephew, to win the high chief's favour. Nan Teauoki sent his wives to have sex with his uncle, and later took him to his lands to convalesce. At the time, a man who has had sex with the wife of his kinsman from the next generation was expected to give him a gift known as te bora. While common examples of te bora included a plot of land or a babai (Cyrtosperma merkusii) garden, Nan Tetabakea's gift to his nephew was the high chieftainship.

With his tacit support, Nan Teauoki began killing each of Nan Tetabakea's sons, the other contenders for the high chieftainship. At each new moon, there was another death, and Nan Tetabakea would take another pebble out of his coconut shell. At first, the people thought that the murders were due to conflicts between kinsmen. When Nan Tetabakea's surviving sons suspected that Nan Teauoki wanted to be high chief, war ensued. Most people fought for Nan Tetabakea's sons, who were seen as the legitimate heirs. After several battles and a long exile, Nan Teauoki prevailed, killing Na Kautuntebuke and assuring himself of the chieftainship.
