= Dorice Reid =

Cook Islander businesswoman, judge (1943–2011)

Te Tika Mataiapo Dorice Reid
- Born: June 1943; Rarotonga, Cook Islands
- Died: 16 June 2011 (aged 67); Auckland, New Zealand
- Occupations: Tourism official, businesswoman, judge
- Known for: Reintroduction of the raui system; tourism development in the Cook Islands
- Title: Te Tika Mataiapo

Dorice Reid (June 1943 – 16 June 2011), also known by the chiefly title Te Tika Mataiapo Dorice Reid, was a Cook Islander tourism official, businesswoman and judge. Reid enjoyed a long career in Cook Island business, politics and tourism from the 1970s until her death in 2011.

== Biography ==
Dorice Reid was born to parents Leo Morrel and Ruby Peyroux (née Matamua), on Rarotonga, Cook Islands. She moved from Rarotonga to New Zealand when she was eight years old.

Reid became very influential among Cook Islanders living in Auckland, New Zealand. She initially worked as a sales representative for Air New Zealand, a Radio Pacific talk show host and a journalist and reporter for South Pacific Television. Reid later became the first woman of Pacific Island descent to be nominated for a seat in the Parliament of New Zealand by a national political party.

Reid moved back from New Zealand to her birthplace of Rarotonga in 1983, residing in Kauare. She took a position with the Cook Islands Tourist Authority as a sales manager and marketer. In 1985 she and her sister, Jeannine Peyroux, acquired the Little Polynesian Resort in Rarotonga. They renovated the small resort and it won two World Travel Awards.

The members of the Takitumu council, one of the three Vaka councils on Rarotonga, bestowed the chiefly title Te Tika Mataiapo on Reid during the late 1980s. The title, which is named for the Cook Islands warrior Te Tika, was granted to Reid at a ceremony in Marae Te Pou Toru. Reid declined multiple requests to run for the Cook Islands Parliament, citing incongruity of engaging in politics while bearing a traditional title.

Reid became an advocate for tourism and the preservation of Cook Islands culture. Reid made several pilgrimages to Taputapuatea marae, a traditional religious centre of eastern Polynesia located in the commune of Taputapuatea, Raiatea, with other Polynesian chiefs. She was also an active member of the Cook Islands Voyaging Society. In 1995, Reid served as the only female crew member on board the Te Au O Tonga, which sailed to Raiatea, Tahiti, Nuku Hiva and Hawaii during a three and a half-month voyage. In 2002, she completed a second sailing voyage aboard the Te Moana Nui O Kiva from her home in Rarotonga to Tahiti, Huahine, Raiatea, Tahaa, Bora Bora and Mitiaro.

Additionally, Reid was a member five separate Cook Islands environmental agencies and served as a judge for the country. She is credited with the reintroduction of the raui system to the Cook Islands, a traditional system forbidding access to or use of a resource, such as to a fishing lagoon or shellfish, for a certain period of time. The system is traditionally used to preserve scarce food resources and also encourages the protection of the environment.

In April 2011, Deputy Prime Minister and Foreign Minister Tom Marsters announced Reid's appointment as High Commissioner of the Cook Islands to New Zealand, based in Wellington. She was meant to take office in July 2011.

In June 2011, Dorice Reid collapsed while attending a tourism conference in Auckland, and died at Auckland Hospital on 16 June 2011, aged 67.
