= Lydia Davis (Cook Islands writer) =

Myra Lydia Davis (1919–2000) was a writer in the Cook Islands. She is known for writing, alongside her husband Thomas Davis, the 1960 novel Makutu, thought to be "perhaps the first novel by South Pacific Island writers."

== Biography ==
Lydia Davis was born Myra Lydia Henderson in 1919 in New Zealand, where she grew up in Dunedin. She studied law at the University of Otago for a period, then trained as a nurse at Dunedin Hospital.

In 1940, she married Thomas Davis, a medical student at the time, in a secret ceremony due to her wealthy parents' disapproval. The couple had three sons: John, Timothy, and Bobby.

She moved with Thomas to his native Rarotonga, in the Cook Islands, where she wrote for various newspapers and magazines in New Zealand, Australia, and the United States. She was influenced and supported in her writing by the American travel writer Robert Dean Frisbie. In 1952, she drew attention for sailing from New Zealand to the United States in a yacht alongside her husband and two children—while pregnant with their third—a journey she catalogued in dispatches to New Zealand newspapers as well as the Saturday Evening Post.

Davis co-wrote with her husband the autobiographical Doctor to the Islands, documenting their experiences during Thomas's career as a medical officer, which was published in 1955 and later adapted into a program for the BBC. The New York Herald Tribune named it an outstanding book of the year. In 1960, they jointly published Makutu, which has been described as the first known novel by writers in the South Pacific islands.

Lydia and Thomas divorced in 1978, the year he became prime minister of the Cook Islands. She died in 2000.
