= O Tahiti Nui Freedom =

O Tahiti Nui Freedom is a single-hulled Polynesian outrigger canoe. Constructed in 2010 by Hiria Ottino, it voyaged from Tahiti to Shanghai as an expedition in which she reversed the path of the Lapita culture and Polynesian expansion through the South Pacific.

== Construction ==
Form:	1 principal hull, 1 outrigger, 2 beams
Sails:	mixed fore-and-aft + jib
Dimensions:	principal hull: 15.25 metres (50.0 ft) outrigger: 14.5 metres (48 ft)
Crew:	6 people

The design of the O Tahiti Nui Freedom was inspired by a historical plan drawn in Tahiti by Admiral Paris around 1820 (standard plank of wood and stitch construction). The design was then reviewed and modernized by a group of naval architects in order to meet the standards of modern safety while respecting the line and form of Paris' 1820 plan. This modified design was then sent to all of the intended ports of call to assure compliance with local standards.

== The expedition ==
The O Tahiti Nui Freedom left Tahiti with a crew of six on July 27, 2010. It arrived in Rarotonga on 4 August, and after repairs, continued on through Tonga, Fiji, Vanuatu, Solomons, Papua New Guinea and the Philippines, Palau, before arriving in Shanghai in November.

Koronui of the Cook Islands served as the wayfinder. Apart from Hiria Ottino, who carried a GPS for the log and a compass, the crew relied entirely on traditional Polynesian navigation. They sought to live as authentically as possible—eating traditional foods, hauling their own water, and surviving on the fish they caught along the way. The story of the voyage, drawn from Ottino’s journal, is told in Michèle Lewon’s book De Tahiti à Shanghai, dans le sillage des tupuna.
