= Cook Islands Voyaging Society =

Non-profit organisation in the Cook Islands

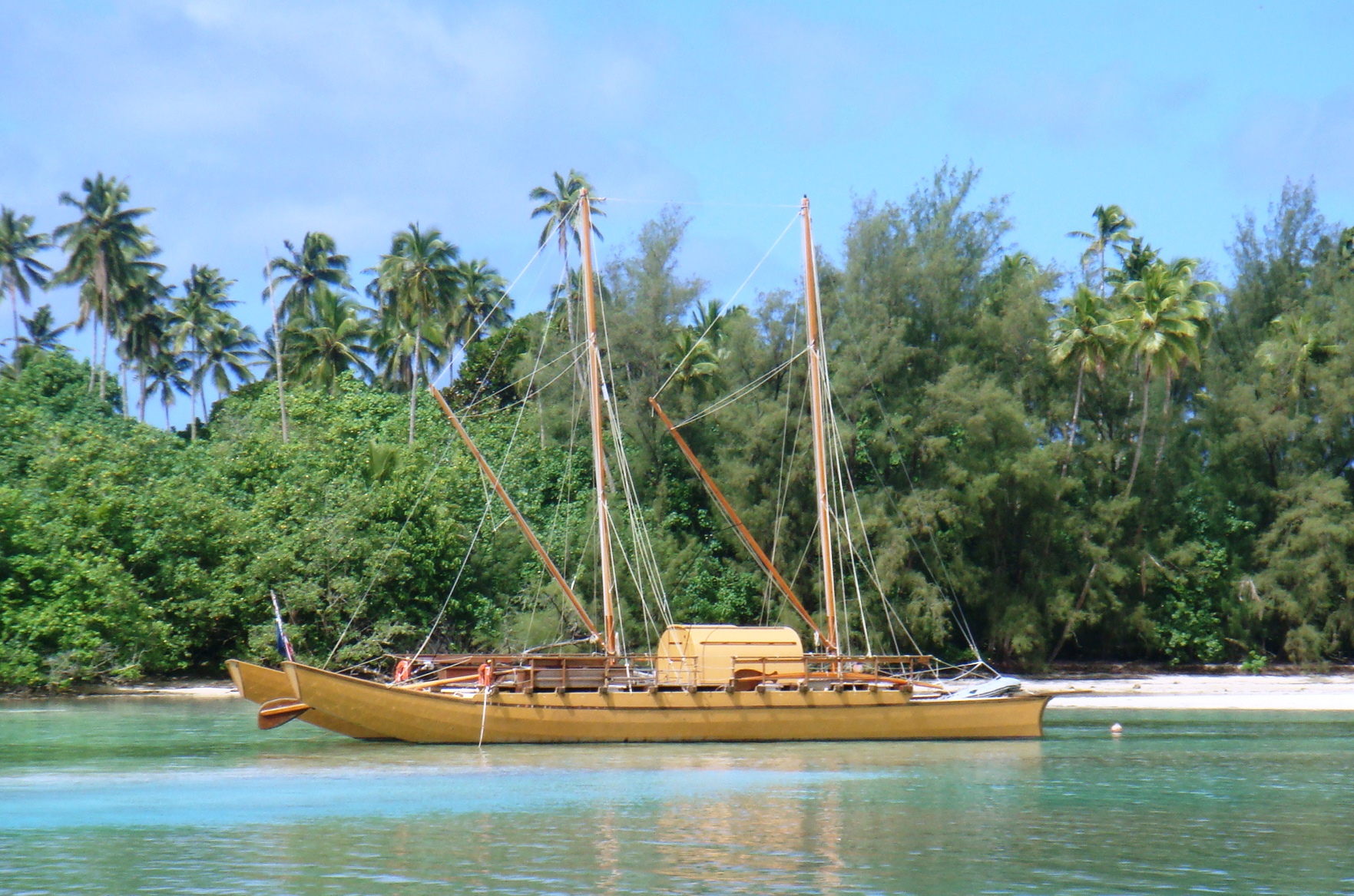
Marumaru Atua, Rarotonga 2010

The Cook Islands Voyaging Society Inc. (CIVS) is a non-profit organisation in the Cook Islands dedicated to the promotion of Polynesian navigation, cultural ancestry, and environmental knowledge for future generations. It builds and sails replicas of traditional double-hulled voyaging canoes, undertaking voyages throughout Polynesia using traditional navigation techniques.

The society was established in 1992, and formally incorporated in 1993. It was initially led by former Cook Islands prime Minister Tom Davis. In 1994, Davis led the design and construction of the society's first replica voyaging canoe, Te Au o Tonga. Te Au o Tonga was later used by the Okeanos Foundation for the Sea as a model for a group of fiberglass-hulled replicas, including Marumaru Atua. Marumaru Atua was gifted to the society in 2014.

Since 2018, the society has collaborated with NGO Korero te Orau to run a school holiday program on traditional voyaging and vaka knowledge.

In December 2019 the society was featured in an exhibit at the Cook Islands National Museum on the revival of voyaging in the Cook Islands. In 2022 the society celebrated its 30th anniversary.

In September 2022 the society partnered with woodcarver Mike Tavioni for the Te Mana O te Vaka boat building and sailing project, to construct six double-hulled vaka using traditional methods. The project resulted in the construction of nine vaka, which were launched in March 2023.

The society is funded by the Cook Islands government, international NGOs, and private donations.
