= Te Atua Mou E =

National anthem of the Cook Islands

Te Atua mou ē
English: To God Almighty
- National anthem of the Cook Islands
- Lyrics: Pa Tepaeru Terito Ariki, Lady Davis
- Music: Sir Tom Davis
- Adopted: 1982

Audio sample
- U.S. Navy Band instrumental version: file; help

"Te Atua mou ē" ("To God Almighty") is the national anthem of the Cook Islands. It was adopted in 1982, replacing "God Defend New Zealand", the New Zealand anthem.

== History ==
The music was written by Sir Tom Davis, then Prime Minister of the Cook Islands. The lyrics are by his wife, Pa Tepaeru Terito Ariki, Lady Davis. In 1982, article 76(D) of the constitution of the Cook Islands declared the song the official anthem of the Cook Islands. The country used "God Defend New Zealand", the New Zealand national anthem, before that.

In 2017, the House of Ariki proposed to change two words from the song, replacing pa enua ("all the islands of the sea") with Kuki Airani (Cook Islands). The change was heavily disliked by residents of the islands. They pointed out the new words were not part of their language, Cook Islands Māori (te reo Māori), and claimed the change was offensive towards Sir Tom Davis and Pa Tepaeru Ariki, Lady Davis.

== Text and melody ==
Te Atua mou ē
Ko koe rāi te pū
O te pā 'enua ē.

'Akarongo mai
I tō mātou nei reo
Tē kāpiki atu nei.

Pāruru mai
I a mātou nei
'Omai te korona mou

Kia ngāteitei
Kia vai rāi te aro'a
𝄆 O te pā 'enua ē. 𝄇

To God almighty,
ruler of the isles
of the sea.

Hearken
our
call.

Protect us
Crown us
With liberty

May peace and love
reign supreme
Throughout the lands.
