= Na Atanga =

High Chief of Makin and Butaritari
- Successor: Kakiaba
- Born: 17th century Gilbert Islands
- Issue: Kourabi; Kakiaba; Nei Mauriteuea
- Father: Teimauri
- Mother: Nei Rakentai

Na Atanga (Note: In the Gilbertese language of Kiribati, personal articles are sometimes used before names. A personal article is usually used when the name is also a word in its own right, e.g. atanga can also mean an "upper plank in a canoe." In the Makin–Butaritari dialect, the masculine personal articles, i.e. those used before the names of males, are Na, Nan, Nam and Nang. The variant used depends on the sound that the name begins with. Outside of Makin and Butaritari, the articles Te, Ten, Tem, and Teng are used. The feminine personal article, i.e. the article used before the names of females, is Nei. It is the same in all dialects of Gilbertese.) was the first high chief of Makin and Butaritari in the Gilbert Islands (in modern-day Kiribati). He probably reigned during the 17th century.

According to oral tradition, Na Atanga was the second-eldest of three brothers on Tarawa. When he came of age, his elder brother, Rairaueana the Warrior, developed an uncontrollable desire for violence and threatened even his own brothers' lives. Their mother, Nei Rakentai, told Rairaueana to leave Tarawa and conquer Makin and Butaritari, the northernmost islands in the Gilberts. When he was still not satiated, Nei Rakentai told him to go even further north. After Rairaueana left the Gilberts, Nei Rakentai installed Na Atanga as the high chief of Makin and Butaritari. His descendants reigned until 1963, when the British colonial administration abolished the dynasty.

== Early life ==
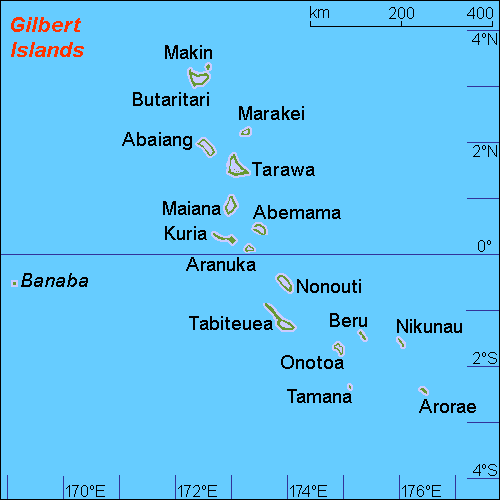
Gilbert Islands

According to oral tradition, Na Atanga was the second eldest of three brothers. His parents, Teimauri and Nei Rakentai, were married on Tabiteuea and moved to Tarawa, where he grew up. His elder brother was Rairaueana the Warrior and his younger brother was Mangkia. (Note: According to a composer and storyteller from Buota, North Tabiteuea, they also had a sister, Nei Tiringatuntai.)

When Rairaueana grew up, he developed an uncontrollable desire for violence and threatened the lives of numerous people on Tarawa. To put an end to this, Nei Rakentai told Rairaueana to leave Tarawa and conquer Makin and Butaritari, the northernmost of the Gilbert Islands. It was arranged that Teimauri, Nei Rakentai, Na Atanga and Mangkia would move to Butaritari after he had finished.

When they arrived, Rairaueana had indeed subjugated Makin and Butaritari, but he was still not satisfied and wanted to kill his own brothers. Nei Rakentai chastised him, saying that if he could not control himself, he should leave and find new places to conquer even further north. Rairaueana never returned to the Gilberts. In his absence, Nei Rakentai installed Na Atanga as the first high chief of Makin and Butaritari.

== Reign ==
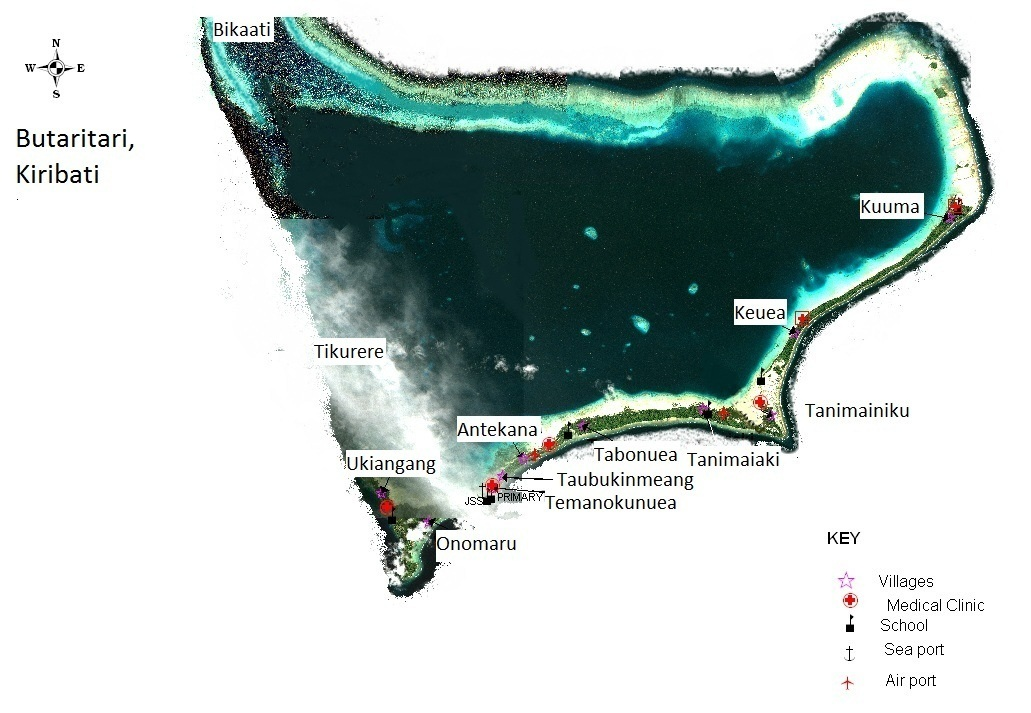
Butaritari, 2012. Na Atanga and Mangkia claimed all of the land south of Tanimaiaki and settled in the main village, which shared its name with the island. This village is not shown on this map because it was later divided into several different villages, including Antekana, Taubukinmeang and Temanokunuea.

After his accession, Na Atanga divided Makin and Butaritari between himself and the four war captains who served under Rairaueana during the conquest. Makin and the villages of Kuma, Keuea, and Tanimaiaki on Butaritari were each given to one of these four captains, and would remain in the possession of their descendants. Na Atanga and Mangkia reserved the section of Butaritari south of Tanimaiaki for themselves, and settled in the main village, which had the same name as the island.

Meanwhile, Kaitu and Uakeia, "probably the most renowned characters in Gilbertese history", had set out from Beru leading dozens of canoes. The fleet proceeded northwards and conquered each island it landed on. The warriors had overrun Maiana, Tarawa, Abaiang and Marakei and were planning a final assault on Makin and Butaritari when Na Atanga sent a delegation out to them. Mangkia, the leader of the delegation, had grown up to become a giant, and his crew was made up of men of similar size. He bore several gifts for the warriors of Beru.

After meeting with the delegates, the warriors agreed not to attack Makin and Butaritari, for fear that the warriors there were all giants like Mangkia. Makin and Butaritari became the sole islands that Kaitu and Uakeia spared. One of the terms of the agreement was that Mangkia, who was detested on Butaritari because of his predilection for human flesh, should be given land on Abemama. Mangkia never returned to Butaritari. The high chiefs of Abemama, Kuria and Aranuka, including the 19th-century despots Tem Baiteke and Tem Binoka, were descendants of Mangkia.

== Legacy ==
Na Atanga had two sons, Kourabi and Kakiaba, and a daughter, Nei Mauriteuea. Kourabi was unpopular with women, whereas Kakiaba had numerous wives and followers. A jealous Kourabi waged an unsuccessful war on his brother before fleeing to Abaiang, where his descendants still live. In 1933, Arthur Grimble reported that the dynasty of high chiefs on Abaiang were descendants of Na Atanga. (Note: For more information on the high chiefs of Abaiang, see Rennie (1989) and Roberts (1953), p. 275.)

Because of Kourabi's absence, Kakiaba succeeded Na Atanga after his death. During Kakiaba's reign, the chiefly families of Makin, Kuma, Keuea and Tanimaiaki, descended from the four war captains who received demesnes from Na Atanga, were purged. All but two of the Kuma chiefs—descendants of Toanuea—were killed. As a result, the villagers of Kuma still trace their descent to Toanuea.

Based on genealogical information, Na Atanga became high chief during the 17th century. (Note: Uriam assumed an approximate birthdate of 1900 for Na Kaiea II, a direct descendant of Kakiaba, and estimated that each generation in an I-Kiribati genealogy lasted 30 years. Kakiaba lived seven generations before Na Kaiea II, so he would have been born around 1690.) Although the British Empire annexed the Gilbert Islands in 1892, Na Atanga's descendants continued to reign until the Resident Commissioner abolished the chieftainship in 1963. In total, there were 14 high chiefs from the first high chief, Na Atanga, to the last, Na Uraura (r. 1959–1963).
