= David Lewis (adventurer) =

Sailor, doctor, and Polynesian scholar

David Lewis DCNZM
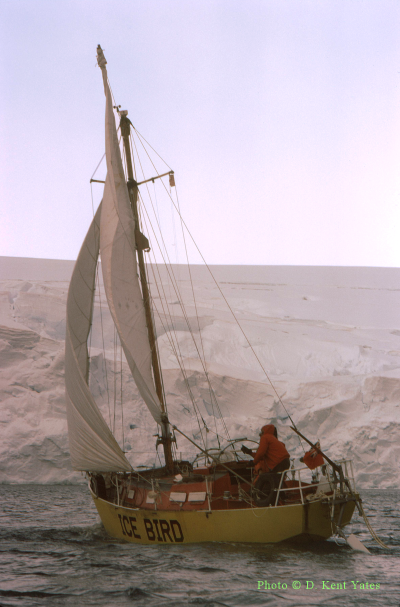
- Born: David Henry Lewis; 1917; Plymouth, England
- Died: 23 October 2002 (aged 84–85); Tin Can Bay, Queensland, Australia
- Occupations: Sailor, author, doctor

David Henry Lewis DCNZM (1917 – 23 October 2002) was a sailor, adventurer, doctor, and scholar of Polynesian culture. He is best known for his studies on the traditional systems of navigation used by the Pacific Islanders. His studies, published in the book We, the Navigators, made these navigational methods known to a wide audience and helped to inspire a revival of traditional voyaging methods in the South Pacific.

== Early life ==
Lewis was born in Plymouth, England, and raised in New Zealand and Rarotonga. He was sent to the Polynesian school in Rarotonga, where he apparently developed his appreciation for Polynesian identity and culture. He remained a New Zealander throughout his life, though he eventually retired to Queensland.

After an adventurous childhood and teenage years including mountaineering and skiing in New Zealand, and a multi-hundred mile kayak journey, he traveled to England in 1938 for medical training at the University of Leeds, and served in the British army as a medical officer. After the war, he worked as a doctor in London, and was involved in setting up the National Health Service.

== Sailing ==
With the announcement in 1960 of the first single-handed trans-Atlantic yacht race (from Plymouth, UK to the US East Coast), Lewis decided to enter in a small 25-foot boat. Following a series of accidents, including a dismasting shortly after leaving, he finished third (Francis Chichester came first), as described in his book The Ship Would Not Travel Due West.

He later decided to sail around the world with his second wife and two small daughters, and built the ocean cruising catamaran Rehu Moana, for this purpose. After an initial voyage towards Greenland, he entered the 1964 single-handed trans-Atlantic race and picked up his family in the United States. They circumnavigated by way of the Strait of Magellan, the South Pacific and the Cape of Good Hope. (See his book Daughters of the Wind.) This was the world's first circumnavigation by multihull.

Following his longstanding interest in old navigational methods used to explore and populate the Pacific, he employed stellar navigation for the Tahiti-Rarotonga-New Zealand leg of the Rehu Moana voyage without using a compass, sextant or marine chronometer.

== Research and literary career ==
See also: Polyesian navigation Micronesian navigation

In 1967, Lewis acquired another boat, Isbjorn, to embark on further field studies of traditional navigation techniques of Pacific islanders. With a research grant from the Australian National University and with his second wife, two daughters and 19-year-old son, he set out for the Pacific again to study traditional navigation techniques. While there, he was welcomed into the cultures of various Pacific Islanders such as Hipour, who taught him their navigational lore, heretofore largely unrecognized by those outside Polynesia. Lewis chronicled this voyage and research in various articles and in his books We, the Navigators and The Voyaging Stars. The title of the former plays on We the Tikopia, a classic study by New Zealand anthropologst Raymond Firth of a tiny South Pacific island of that name, whose Polyesian inhabitants are gifted navigators. Lewis was also one of the first academics to document te lapa, an unexplained light phenomenon used by Polynesians to navigate.

David Lewis also sought out navigators of the Caroline Islands, Santa Cruz Islands and Tonga to confirm that traditional techniques had been retained by navigators from Polynesia, Micronesia and Melanesia. The voyages of Lewis on his ketch Isbjorn included: Tevake navigating between the Santa Cruz Islands; and Hipour of Puluwat navigating in the Caroline Islands; and also conversations with Fe’iloakitau Kaho, Ve’ehala and Kaloni Kienga from Tonga; Temi Rewi of Beru and Iotiabata Ata of Tarawa in the Gilbert Islands; and Yaleilei of Satawal in the Caroline Islands.

Lewis' voyages and resulting books gave inspiration to the revival in traditional Polynesian canoe building and voyaging. In 1976, Lewis joined Polynesian Voyaging Society's first experimental voyage from Hawaii to Tahiti on Hokule'a. The team successfully navigated using traditional methods to Tahiti. Lewis departed from Hokule'a in Tahiti and went on to work in his own research.

Along with Dr. Marianne (Mimi) George, he identified that traditional Polynesian navigational techniques were still preserved in the Polynesian outlier Taumako.

Lewis's next adventure in 1972 was an attempt at circumnavigating Antarctica single-handed. For this he acquired a small steel yacht, named Ice Bird. Facing treacherous conditions in the Southern Ocean after departing, Lewis was not heard from for 13 weeks but eventually managed to sail the Ice Bird to the Antarctic Peninsula under a jury rig after dismasting. Lewis was rescued by personnel from the Antarctic research outpost Palmer Station, who subsequently repaired the Ice Bird while Lewis spent the Antarctic winter in Australia. He also met Calypso during Jacques Cousteau's Antarctica expedition and was greeted by Cousteau and crew onboard who helped him as much as he could and also contacted Lewis' family in Australia.

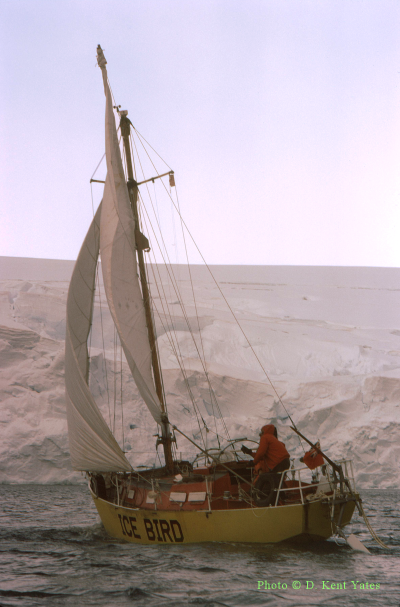
Ice Bird trials off Palmer Station, 1973

After returning eight months later, Lewis left Palmer station to complete the voyage, but that very same day was caught in a heavy ice field and had to be towed to open water by the R.V. Hero. Later, Lewis capsized again and eventually brought the boat to Cape Town, South Africa. Edited aspects of these events are described in his bestselling book, Ice Bird.

His son, Barry, sailed the yacht back to Sydney from South Africa where it underwent extensive work to prevent further corrosion. In 1982, Dr. Lewis donated Ice Bird to the Powerhouse Museum in Sydney, Australia.

After the Ice Bird voyage, Lewis was involved in setting up the Oceanic Research Foundation with the aim of sending private expeditions to the Antarctic. In a 17.4-metre (57 ft) Alan Payne-designed steel yacht named "Solo" with seven other crew, Lewis made a summer expedition to Antarctica and wintered over there, 1977–78. Lewis spent some of his later years conducting research into traditional navigation techniques of the Inuit on the Bering Strait region. One obituary said of Lewis that he "always brought his crews home intact. He was a typical Polynesian sailor, getting into trouble through haste and neglect, then, with near superhuman courage and seamanship, fighting his way out of it".

Following this, he retired to New Zealand to write his autobiography, Shapes on the Wind; one of 12 books he wrote. In the 2001 Queen's Birthday Honours, Lewis was appointed a Distinguished Companion of the New Zealand Order of Merit, for services to yachting and exploration. He finally retired to Australia, and died at Gympie, Queensland.

== See also ==
- Celestial navigation
- Polynesian navigation
- Micronesian navigation

== Publications ==
1. The Ship Would Not Travel Due West, by David H. Lewis, 1961
2. Dreamers of the Day, by David H. Lewis, 1964
3. Daughters of the Wind, by David H. Lewis, 1967
4. Children Of Three Oceans, by David H. Lewis, 1969
5. We, The Navigators, by David H. Lewis, 1972
6. Ice Bird, by David H. Lewis, 1976
7. The Voyaging Stars, by David H. Lewis, 1978
8. Voyage To The Ice. The Antarctic Expedition of Solo, by David H. Lewis, 1979
9. Icebound In Antarctica, by David H. Lewis with Mimi George, 1988
10. Lewis, David (1994), We the Navigators: The Ancient art of Landfinding in the Pacific, University of Hawaii Press
11. Shapes on the Wind, by David H. Lewis, 2000
