= Polynesian navigation =

Methods to navigate the Pacific Ocean

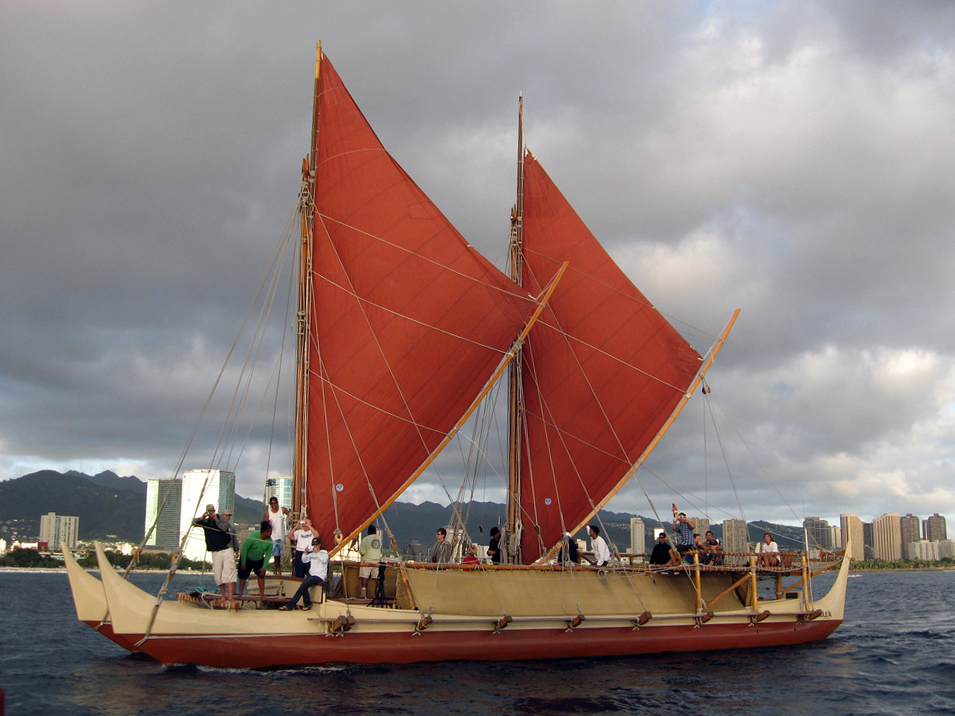
Hōkūleʻa, a fibreglass-hulled replica of a Hawaiian double-hulled canoe sailing off Honolulu, 2009

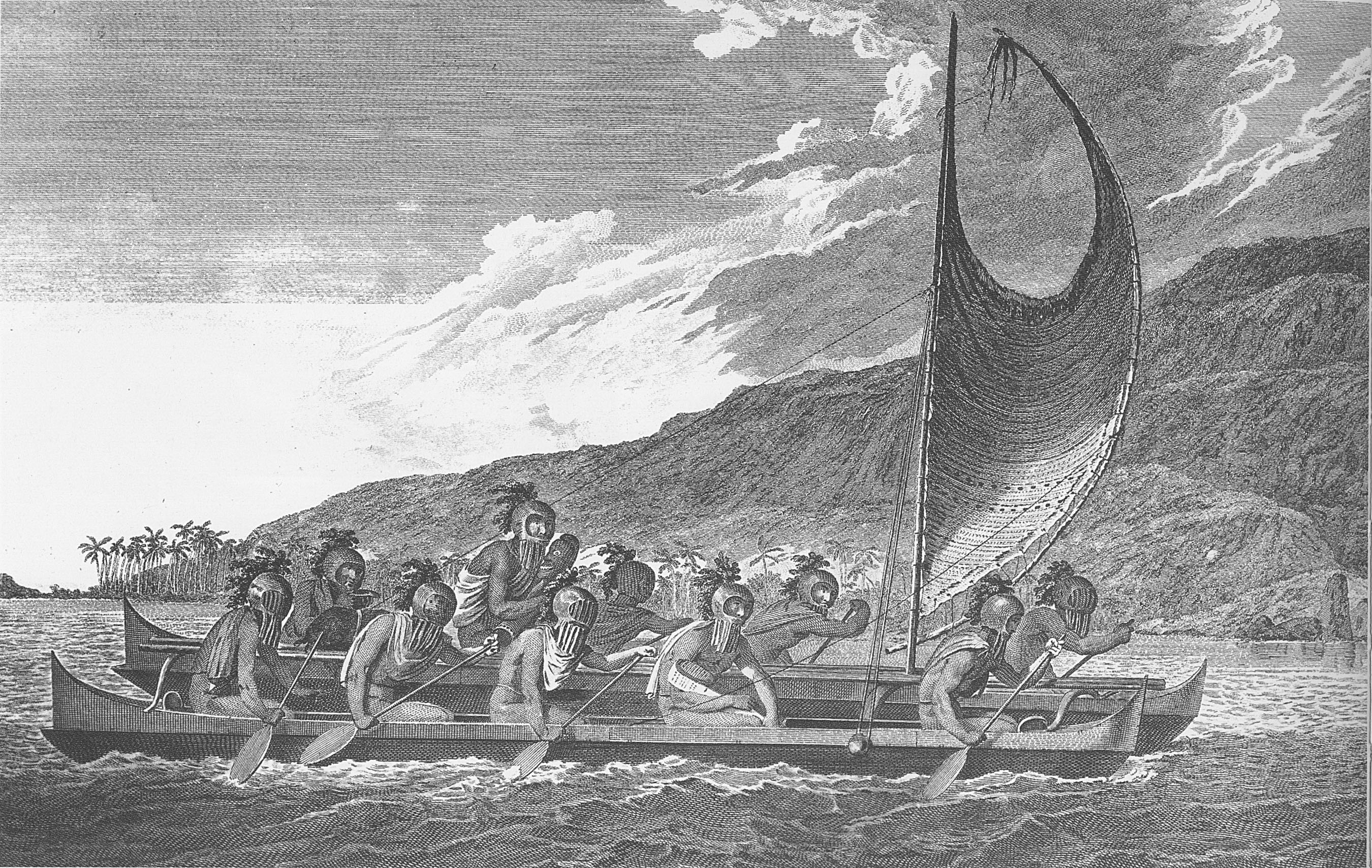
Hawaiians sailing a double-hulled canoe, c. 1781

Polynesian navigation or Polynesian wayfinding was used for thousands of years to enable long voyages across thousands of kilometres of the open Pacific Ocean. Polynesians made contact with nearly every island within the vast Polynesian Triangle, using outrigger canoes or double-hulled canoes. The double-hulled canoes were two large hulls, equal in length, and lashed side by side. The space between the paralleled canoes allowed for storage of food, hunting materials, and nets when embarking on long voyages. Polynesian navigators used wayfinding techniques such as the navigation by the stars, and observations of birds, ocean swells, and wind patterns, and relied on a large body of knowledge from oral tradition. This island hopping was a solution to the scarcity of useful resources, such as food, wood, water, and available land, on the small islands in the Pacific Ocean. When an island’s required resources for human survival began to run low, the island's inhabitants used their maritime navigation skills and set sail for new islands. However, as an increasing number of islands in the South Pacific became occupied, and citizenship and national borders became of international importance, this was no longer possible. People thus became trapped on islands that lacked the ability to support them.

Navigators travelled to small inhabited islands using wayfinding techniques and knowledge passed by oral tradition from master to apprentice, often in the form of song. Generally, each island maintained a guild of navigators who had very high status; in times of famine or difficulty, they could trade for aid or evacuate people to neighbouring islands. As of 2014, these traditional navigation methods are still taught in the Polynesian outlier of Taumako in the Solomons and by voyaging societies throughout the Pacific.

Both wayfinding techniques and outrigger canoe construction methods have been kept as guild secrets, but in the modern revival of these skills, they are being recorded and published.

== History ==
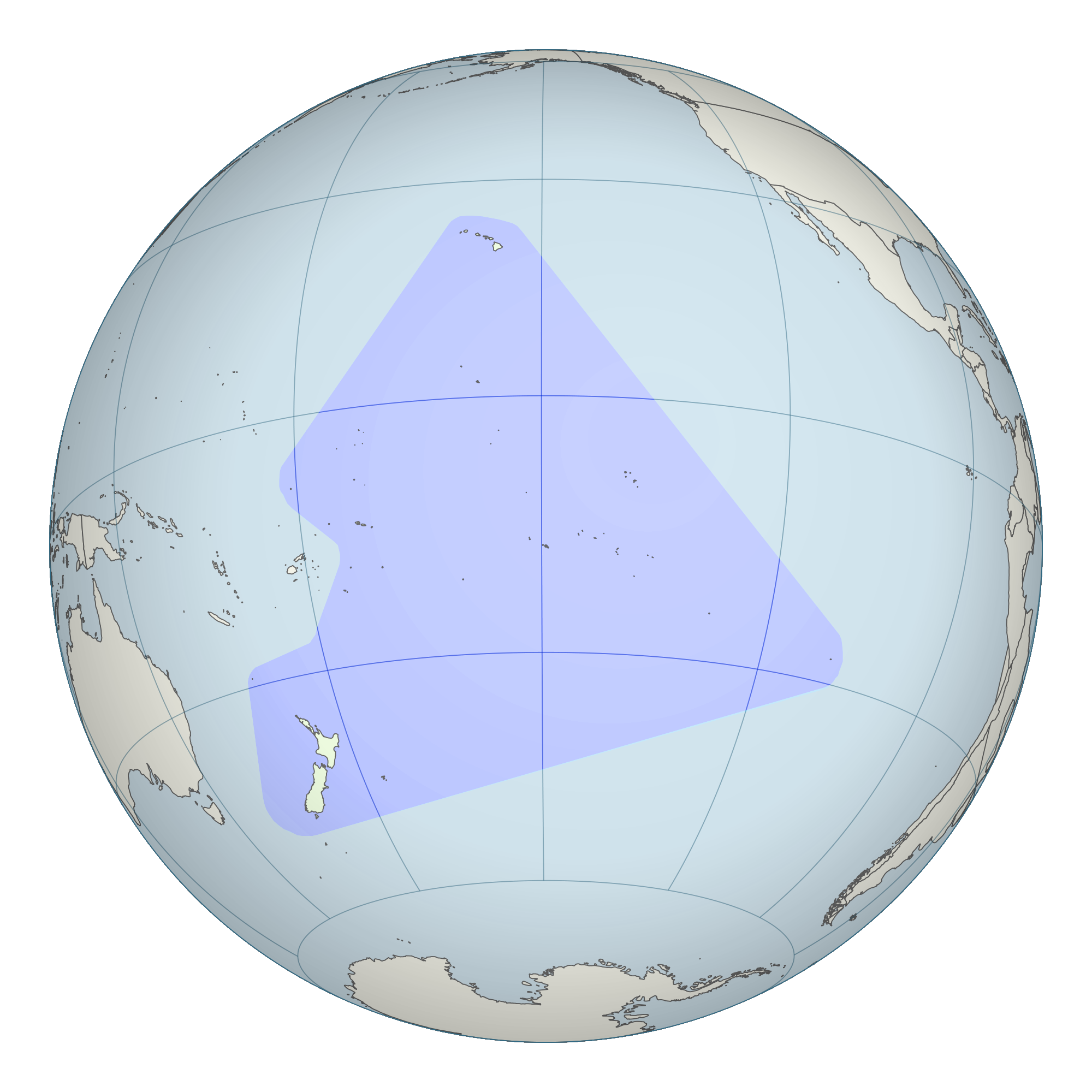
The Polynesian triangle

Between about 3000 and 1000 BC speakers of Austronesian languages spread through the islands of Southeast Asia – most likely starting out from Taiwan, as tribes whose natives were thought to have previously arrived from mainland South China about 8000 years ago – into the edges of western Micronesia and on into Melanesia, through the Philippines and Indonesia. In the archeogenetic record, there are well-defined traces of this expansion that allow the path it took to be followed and dated with a degree of certainty. In the mid-2nd millennium BC, a distinctive culture appeared suddenly in north-west Melanesia, in the Bismarck Archipelago, the chain of islands forming a great arch from New Britain to the Admiralty Islands.

This culture, known as Lapita, stands out in the Melanesian archeological record, with its large permanent villages on beach terraces along the coasts. Particularly characteristic of the Lapita culture is the making of pottery, including a great many vessels of varied shapes, some distinguished by fine patterns and motifs pressed into the clay. Between about 1300 and 900 BC, the Lapita culture spread 6,000 km (3,700 mi) farther to the east from the Bismarck Archipelago, until it reached as far as Tonga and Samoa. Lapita pottery persisted in places such as Samoa, Tonga, and Fiji for many years after its introduction to Western Polynesia but eventually died out in most of Polynesia due to the scarcity of clay. Although the production of ceramics did not travel beyond Western Polynesia, some ceramic materials have been recovered through archeological excavations in the Central Polynesia but have been attributed to trade.

In accordance with Polynesian oral tradition, the geography of Polynesian navigation pathways is said to resemble the geometric qualities of an octopus with head centred on Ra'iātea (French Polynesia) and tentacles spread out across the Pacific. In oral tradition the octopus is known by various names such as Taumata-Fe'e-Fa'atupu-Hau (Grand Octopus of Prosperity), Tumu-Ra'i-Fenua (Beginning-of-Heaven-and-Earth) and Te Wheke-a-Muturangi (The Octopus of Muturangi).

Specific chronology of the discovery and settlement of specific island groups within Eastern and Central Polynesia is hotly debated among archeologists, but a generally accepted timeline puts the initial settlement of the Cook Islands before 1000 AD. From this point, navigation branched out in all directions with Eastern Polynesia (including the Society Islands and the Marquesas Islands) settled first followed by more remote regions such as Hawaii, Easter Island, and New Zealand peopled later. The pattern of settlement also extended to the north of Samoa to the Tuvaluan atolls, with Tuvalu providing a stepping stone to the founding of Polynesian Outlier communities in Melanesia and Micronesia. The natives of Easter Island likely originated from Mangareva. They discovered the island by using the flight path of the sooty tern. When the first European to visit the island, Jacob Roggeveen, landed on Easter Island, he found no evidence of navigation. Instead, he noticed that there were not enough trees to build seaworthy canoes and the rafts the natives were using were not seaworthy either.

The archeological record supports oral histories of the first peopling of region including both the timing and geographical origins of Polynesian society.

== Navigational techniques ==
Polynesian navigation relies heavily on constant observation and memorization. Navigators have to memorize where they have sailed from in order to know where they are. The sun was the main guide for navigators because they could follow its exact points as it rose and set. Once the sun had set they would use the rising and setting points of the stars. When there were no stars because of a cloudy night or during daylight, a navigator would use the winds and swells as guides.

Through constant observation, navigators were able to detect changes in the speed of their canoes, their heading, and the time of day or night. Polynesian navigators thus employed a wide range of techniques including the use of the stars, the movement of ocean currents and wave patterns, the patterns of bioluminescence that indicated the direction in which islands were located, the air and sea interference patterns caused by islands and atolls, the flight of birds, the winds and the weather.

=== Bird observation ===
Certain seabirds such as the white tern and noddy tern fly out to sea in the morning to hunt fish, then return to land at night. Navigators seeking land sail opposite the birds' path in the morning and with them at night, especially relying on large groups of birds, and keeping in mind changes during nesting season.

Harold Gatty suggested that long-distance Polynesian voyaging followed the seasonal paths of bird migrations. In The Raft Book, a survival guide he wrote for the U.S. military during World War II, Gatty outlined various Polynesian navigation techniques for shipwrecked sailors or aviators to find land. There are some references in their oral traditions to the flight of birds, and Gatty claimed that departing voyages used onshore range marks pointing to distant islands in line with their flight paths. A voyage from Tahiti, the Tuamotus or the Cook Islands to New Zealand might have followed the migration of the long-tailed cuckoo (Eudynamys taitensis), just as a voyage from Tahiti to Hawaiʻi would coincide with the track of the Pacific golden plover (Pluvialis fulva) and the bristle-thighed curlew (Numenius tahitiensis).

It is also believed that Polynesians, like many seafaring peoples, kept shore-sighting birds. One theory is that voyagers took a frigatebird (Fregata) with them. This bird's feathers become drenched and useless if it lands on water, so voyagers would release it when they thought they were close to land, and would follow it if it did not return to the canoe.

=== Navigation by the stars ===
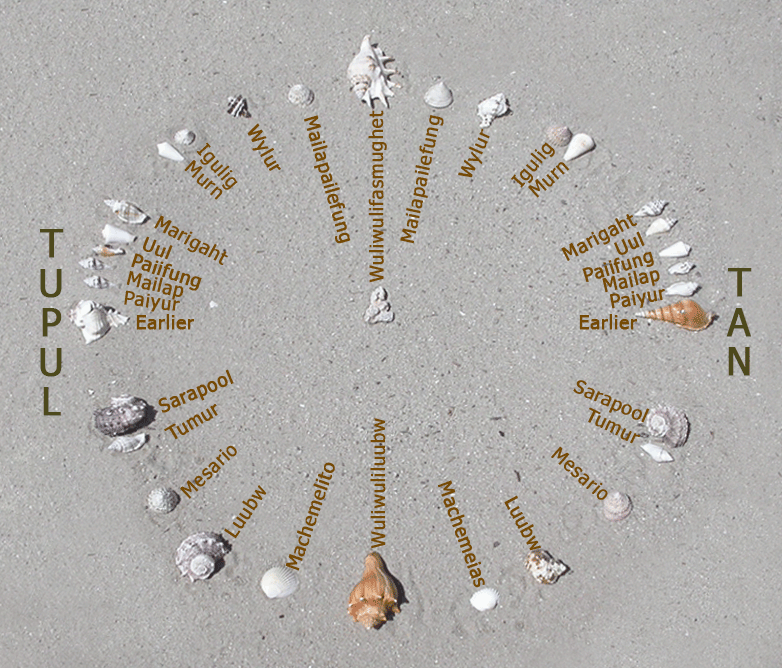
Star compass of Mau Piailug taught in the Caroline Islands, with North at top. Re-creation with shells on sand, with Satawalese (Chuukic) text labels, from the Polynesian Voyaging Society. See annotations on Commons.

The positions of the stars helped guide Polynesian voyages. Stars, as opposed to planets, hold fixed celestial positions year-round, changing only their rising time with the seasons. Each star has a specific declination, and can give a bearing for navigation as it rises or sets. Polynesian voyagers would set a heading by a star near the horizon, switching to a new one once the first rose too high. A specific sequence of stars would be memorized for each route. The Polynesians also took measurements of stellar elevation to determine their latitude. The latitudes of specific islands were also known, and the technique of "sailing down the latitude" was used. That is, Polynesians navigated by the stars through knowledge of when particular stars, as they rotated through the night sky, would pass over the island to which the voyagers were sailing. Also knowledge that the movement of stars over different islands followed a similar pattern (that is, all the islands had a similar relationship to the night sky) provided the navigators with a sense of latitude, so that they could sail with the prevailing wind, before turning east or west to reach the island that was their destination.

Some star compass systems specify as many as 150 stars with known bearings, though most systems have only a few dozen (illustration at right). The development of sidereal compasses has been studied and hypothesized to have developed from an ancient pelorus instrument.

For navigators near the equator, celestial navigation is simplified, given that the whole celestial sphere is exposed. Any star that passes through the zenith (overhead) moves along the celestial equator, the basis of the equatorial coordinate system.

=== Swell ===
The Polynesians also used wave and swell formations to navigate. Many of the habitable areas of the Pacific Ocean are groups of islands (or atolls) in chains hundreds of kilometres long. Island chains have predictable effects on waves and currents. Navigators who lived within a group of islands would learn the effect various islands had on the swell shape, direction, and motion, and would have been able to correct their path accordingly. Even when they arrived in the vicinity of an unfamiliar chain of islands, they may have been able to detect signs similar to those of their home.

Once they had arrived fairly close to a destination island, they would have been able to pinpoint its location by sightings of land-based birds, certain cloud formations, as well as the reflections of shallow water made on the undersides of clouds. It is thought that the Polynesian navigators may have measured sailing time between islands in "canoe-days".

The energy transferred from the wind to the sea produces wind waves. The waves that are created when the energy travels down away from the source area (like ripples) are known as swell. When the winds are strong at the source area, the swell is larger. The longer the wind blows, the longer the swell lasts. Because the swells of the ocean can remain consistent for days, navigators relied on them to carry their canoe in a straight line from one house (or point) on the star compass to the opposite house of the same name. Navigators were not always able to see stars; because of this, they relied on the swells of the ocean. Swell patterns are a much more reliable method of navigation than waves, which are determined by the local winds. Swells move in a straight direction which makes it easier for the navigator to determine whether the canoe is heading in the correct direction.

=== Clouds, reflections off clouds, and the colour of the sky ===
Polynesian navigators could identify the clouds that resulted from the white sand of coral atolls reflecting heat into the sky. Subtle differences in the colour of the sky also could be recognised as resulting from the presence of lagoons or shallow waters, as deep water was a poor reflector of light while the lighter colour of the water of lagoons and shallow waters could be identified in the reflection in the sky.

In Eastern Polynesia, navigators sailing from Tahiti to the Tuamotus would sail directly east towards Anaa atoll, which has a shallow lagoon that reflects a faint green colour on to the clouds above the atoll. If the navigator drifted off their course, they could correct their course when they sighted the reflection of the lagoon in the clouds in the distance.

=== Te lapa ===
David Lewis was one of the first academics, along with Marianne George, to document an unexplained light phenomenon. Te lapa is a burst of light in a straight line occurring on, or just below, the water surface, and originates from islands. It is used by Polynesians to reorient themselves out at sea or to find new islands.

=== Navigational devices ===
There is currently no evidence of historic Polynesian navigators using navigational devices on board vessels. However, the Micronesian people of the Marshall Islands have a history of using a stick chart onshore, to serve as spatial representations of islands and the conditions around them. Micronesian navigators created charts using the rib of coconut leaves attached to a square frame, with the curvature and meeting-points of the coconut ribs indicating the wave motion that was the result of islands standing in the path of the prevailing wind and the run of the waves.

=== Comparison with other navigators ===
When European navigators first learnt of the navigational skills of Polynesians, they compared them to their own methods, which relied on, among other things, the compass, charts, astronomical tables, the sextant (or an earlier instrument with the same role) and, in later phases of European exploration, chronometers. The interest shown by European navigators, such as James Cook and Andia y Varela was heightened by their lack of knowledge of environmental navigation techniques used by their European predecessors. Non-instrumental-based navigation had been carried out in many parts of the world, having occurred in the Indian Ocean, the Mediterranean and the European Atlantic. The details of these techniques varied to suit the latitude and the usual weather patterns. One such difference is that the zone in which most Polynesian voyaging was carried out was within 20° of the equator, so rising and setting stars did so at an angle that was close to vertical relative to the horizon. This is helpful to the technique of marking directions with the rising and setting points of identified stars.

== Extent of voyaging ==
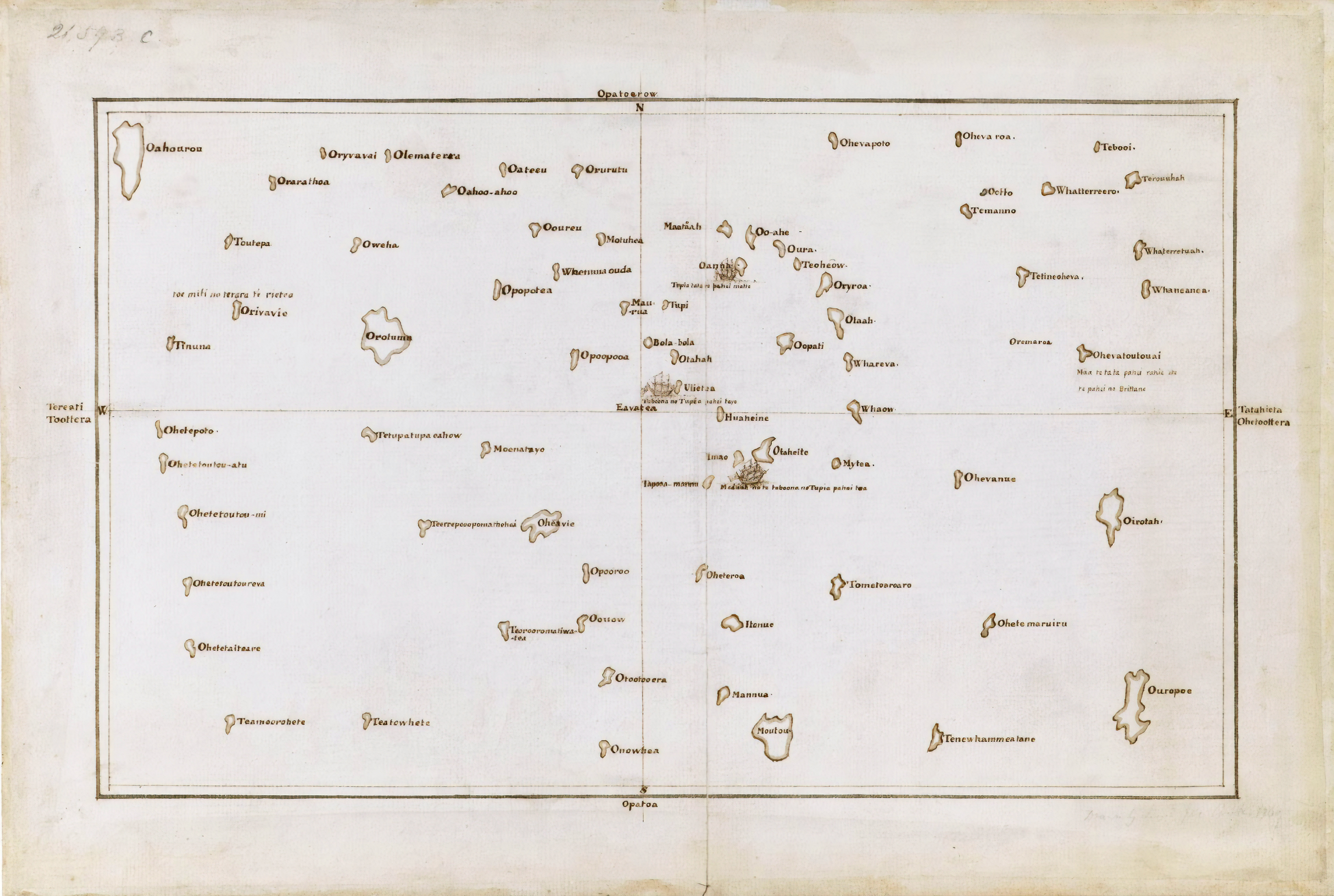
Tupaia's chart of Polynesia within 3200km of Ra'iatea. 1769, preserved in the British Museum.

On his first voyage of Pacific exploration, Captain James Cook had the services of a Polynesian navigator, Tupaia, who drew a chart of the islands within a 2,000 miles (3,200 km) radius (to the north and west) of his home island of Ra'iatea. Tupaia had knowledge of 130 islands and named 74 on his chart. Tupaia had navigated from Ra'iatea in short voyages to 13 islands. He had not visited western Polynesia, as since his grandfather's time the extent of voyaging by Raiateans had diminished to the islands of eastern Polynesia. His grandfather and father had passed to Tupaia the knowledge as to the location of the major islands of western Polynesia and the navigation information necessary to voyage to Fiji, Samoa and Tonga. Tupaia was hired by Joseph Banks, the ship's naturalist, who wrote that Cook ignored Tupaia's chart and downplayed his skills as a navigator.

However, in February 1778, Cook recorded his impressions of the dispersal and settlement of Polynesian people across the Pacific Ocean in favorable terms:

How shall we account for this nation's having spread itself, in so many detached islands, so widely disjoined from each other in every quarter of the Pacific Ocean? We find it, from New Zealand, in the South, as far as the Sandwich Islands (Hawaiʻi), to the North, and, in another direction, from Easter Island, to the Hebrides (Vanuatu); that is, over an extent of sixty degrees of latitude, or twelve hundred leagues north and south, and eighty-three degrees of longitude, or sixteen hundred and sixty leagues east and west! How much farther in either direction its colonies reach is not known; but what we know already; in consequence of this and our former voyage, warrants our pronouncing it to be, though perhaps not the most numerous, certainly by far the most extensive, nation upon earth.

=== Subantarctic and Antarctica ===
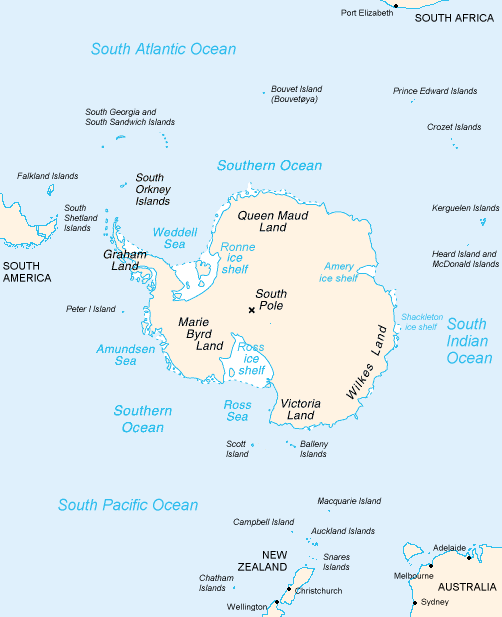
Antarctica and surrounding islands, showing the Auckland Islands just above (south of) New Zealand, at the center bottom of the image

There is academic debate on the furthest southern extent of Polynesian expansion.

The islands of New Zealand, along with a series of outlying islands, have been labelled 'South Polynesia' by New Zealand archaeologist Atholl Anderson. These islands include the Kermadec Islands, the Chatham Islands, the Auckland Islands and Norfolk Island. In each of these islands there is radiocarbon dating evidence of visits from Polynesians by 1500. The remains of an oceangoing waka found on Chatham Island in 2024 has been dated to 1440 to 1470.The material evidence of Polynesian visits to at least one of the subantarctic islands to the south of New Zealand consists of the remains of a settlement. This evidence from Enderby Island in the Auckland Islands has been radiocarbon dated back to the 13th Century. Absence of remains further south than the Auckland Islands may imply there was a 2000 kilometre boundary around Antarctica that Polynesian peoples may not have crossed.

Descriptions of a shard of early Polynesian pottery buried on the Antipodes Islands are unsubstantiated, and the Museum of New Zealand Te Papa Tongarewa, where it was supposedly stored, has stated that "The Museum has not been able to locate such a shard in its collection, and the original reference to the object in the Museum's collection documentation indicates no reference to Polynesian influences."

Oral history describes Ui-te-Rangiora, around the year 650, leading a fleet of Waka Tīwai south until they reached, "a place of bitter cold where rock-like structures rose from a solid sea". The brief description might match the Ross Ice Shelf or possibly the Antarctic mainland, but may be a description of icebergs surrounded by sea ice found in the Southern Ocean.

=== Pre-Columbian contact with the Americas ===
In the mid-20th century, Thor Heyerdahl proposed a new theory of Polynesian origins (one which did not win general acceptance), arguing that the Polynesians had migrated from South America on balsa-log boats.

The presence in the Cook Islands of sweet potatoes, a plant native to the Americas (called kūmara in Māori), which have been radiocarbon-dated to 1000 CE, has been cited as evidence that Native Americans could have traveled to Oceania. The current thinking is that sweet potato was brought to central Polynesia circa 700 CE and spread across Polynesia from there, possibly by Polynesians who had traveled to South America and back. An alternative explanation posits biological dispersal; plants and/or seeds could float across the Pacific without any human contact.

A 2007 study published in the Proceedings of the National Academy of Sciences examined chicken bones at El Arenal, Chile, near the Arauco Peninsula. The results suggested Oceania-to-America contact. The domestication of chickens originated in southern Asia, whereas the Araucana breed of Chile is thought to have been introduced to the Americas by Spaniards around 1500. The bones found in Chile were radiocarbon-dated to between 1304 and 1424, prior to the documented arrival of the Spanish. DNA sequences taken were exact matches to the sequences of chickens from the same period in American Samoa and Tonga, both over 5000 miles (8000 kilometers) away from Chile. The genetic sequences were also similar to those found in Hawaiʻi and Easter Island, the closest Polynesian island, at only 2500 miles (4000 kilometers). The sequences did not match any breed of European chicken. Although this initial report suggested a Polynesian pre-Columbian origin, a later report looking at the same specimens concluded:

A published, apparently pre-Columbian, Chilean specimen and six pre-European Polynesian specimens also cluster with the same European/Indian subcontinental/Southeast Asian sequences, providing no support for a Polynesian introduction of chickens to South America. In contrast, sequences from two archaeological sites on Easter Island group with an uncommon haplogroup from Indonesia, Japan, and China and may represent a genetic signature of an early Polynesian dispersal. Modeling of the potential marine carbon contribution to the Chilean archaeological specimen casts further doubt on claims for pre-Columbian chickens, and definitive proof will require further analyses of ancient DNA sequences and radiocarbon and stable isotope data from archaeological excavations within both Chile and Polynesia.

However, in a later study, the original authors extended and elaborated their findings, concluding:

This comprehensive approach demonstrates that the examination of modern chicken DNA sequences does not contribute to our understanding of the origins of Chile's earliest chickens. Interpretations based on poorly sourced and documented modern chicken populations, divorced from the archeological and historical evidence, do not withstand scrutiny. Instead, this expanded account will confirm the pre-Columbian age of the El Arenal remains and lend support to our original hypothesis that their appearance in South America is most likely due to Polynesian contact with the Americas in prehistory.

In 2005, a linguist and an archeologist proposed a theory of contact between Hawaiians and the Chumash people of Southern California between 400 and 800 CE. The sewn-plank canoes crafted by the Chumash and neighboring Tongva are unique among the indigenous peoples of North America, but similar in design to larger canoes used by Polynesians and Melanesians for deep-sea voyages. Tomolo'o, the Chumash word for such a craft, may derive from tumula'au/kumula'au, the Hawaiian term for the logs from which shipwrights carve planks to be sewn into canoes. The analogous Tongva term, tii'at, is unrelated. If it occurred, this contact left no genetic legacy in California or Hawaii. This theory has attracted limited media attention within California, but most archaeologists of the Tongva and Chumash cultures reject it on the grounds that the independent development of the sewn-plank canoe over several centuries is well-represented in the material record.

Polynesian contact with the prehispanic Mapuche culture in central-south Chile has been suggested because of apparently similar cultural traits, including words like toki (stone axes and adzes), hand clubs similar to the Māori wahaika, the dalca –a sewn-plank canoe as used on Chiloe Archipelago, the curanto earth oven (Polynesian umu) common in southern Chile, fishing techniques such as stone wall enclosures, palín –a hockey-like game– and other potential parallels. Some strong westerlies and El Niño wind blow directly from central-east Polynesia to the Mapuche region, between Concepción and Chiloe. A direct connection from New Zealand is possible, sailing with the Roaring Forties. In 1834, some escapees from Tasmania arrived at Chiloe Island after sailing for 43 days.

A Mangarevan legend tells of Anua Matua who sailed in south-west direction reaching southernmost South America.

== Post-colonial research history ==
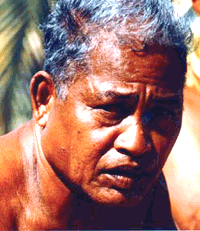
Navigator Mau Piailug (1932–2010) of Satawal island, Micronesia

Knowledge of the traditional Polynesian methods of navigation was widely lost after contact with and colonization by Europeans. This caused debates over the reasons for the presence of the Polynesians in such isolated and scattered parts of the Pacific. According to Andrew Sharp, the explorer Captain James Cook, already familiar with Charles de Brosses's accounts of large groups of Pacific islanders who were driven off course in storms and ended up hundreds of miles away with no idea where they were, encountered in the course of one of his own voyages a castaway group of Tahitians who had become lost at sea in a gale and blown 1000 miles away to the island of Atiu. Cook wrote that this incident "will serve to explain, better than the thousand conjectures of speculative reasoners, how the detached parts of the earth, and, in particular, how the South Seas, may have been peopled".

By the late 19th century to the early 20th century, a more generous view of Polynesian navigation had come into favor, creating a much romanticized view of their seamanship, canoes, and navigational expertise. Late 19th- and early 20th-century writers such as Abraham Fornander and Percy Smith told of heroic Polynesians migrating in great coordinated fleets from Asia far and wide into present-day Polynesia.

Another view was presented by Andrew Sharp, who challenged the "heroic vision" hypothesis, asserting instead that Polynesian maritime expertise was severely limited in the field of exploration, and that as a result, the settlement of Polynesia had been the result of luck, random island sightings, and drifting, rather than as organized voyages of colonization. Thereafter, the oral knowledge passed down for generations allowed for eventual mastery of traveling between known locations. Sharp's reassessment caused a huge amount of controversy and led to a stalemate between the romantic and the skeptical views.

== Re-creation of voyages ==
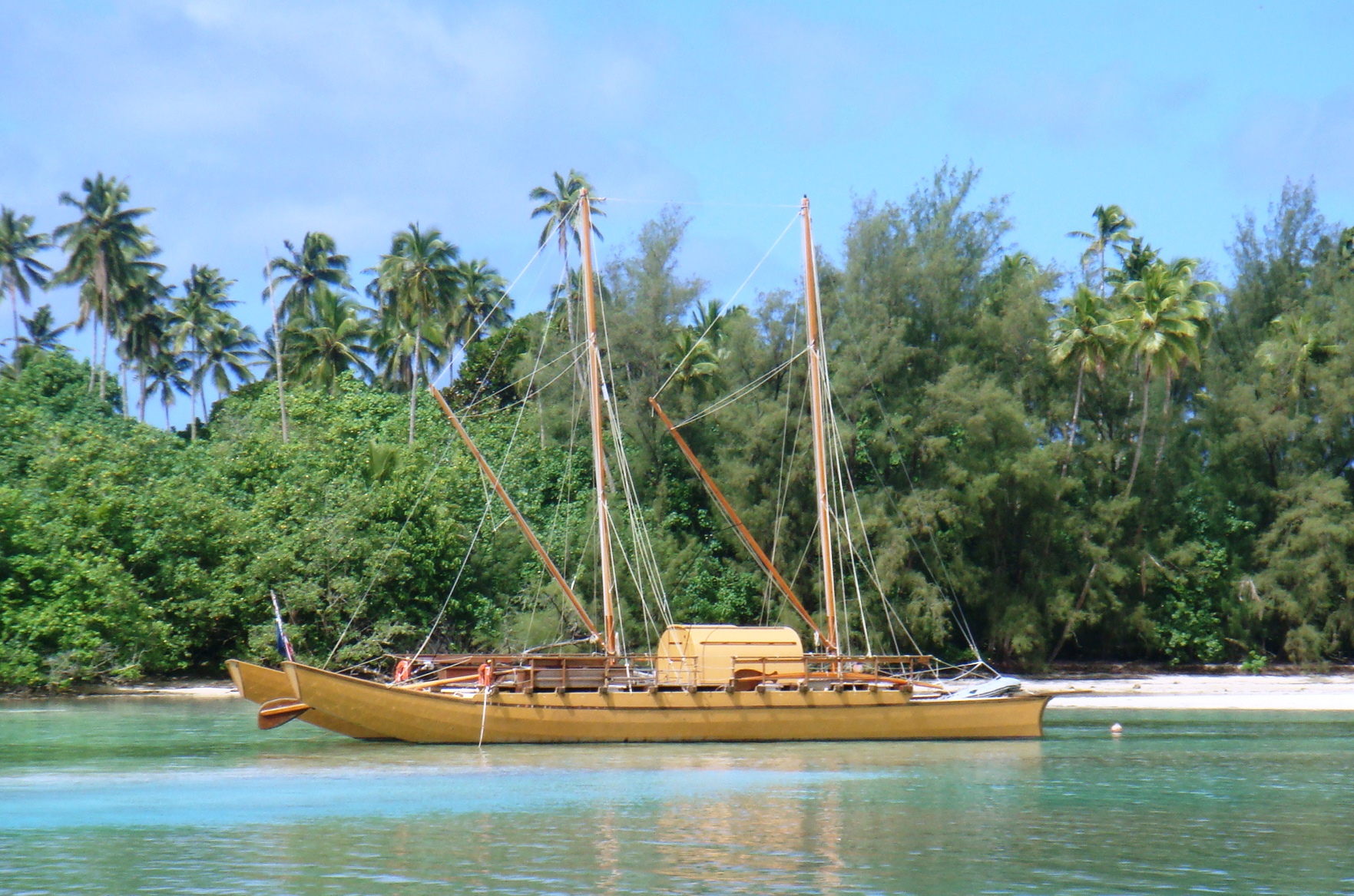
Marumaru Atua in Rarotonga, 2010.

In the 1960s David Lewis sailed his catamaran from Tahiti to New Zealand, via Rarotonga using stellar navigation without instruments. Lewis sought out navigators of the Caroline Islands, Santa Cruz Islands and Tonga to confirm that traditional techniques had been retained by navigators from Polynesia, Micronesia and Melanesia. Voyages on his ketch Isbjorn included: Tevake navigating between the Santa Cruz Islands; and Hipour of Puluwat navigating in the Caroline Islands; and also conversations with Fe'iloakitau Kaho, Ve'ehala and Kaloni Kienga from Tonga; Temi Rewi of Beru and Iotiabata Ata of Tarawa in the Gilbert Islands; and Yaleilei of Satawal in the Caroline Islands. He wrote We the Navigators in 1972 about his experiences, the title a play on the classic We the Tikopia by New Zealand anthropologist Raymond Firth, about the island of that name, whose inhabitants were gifted navigators.

Ethnographic research in the Caroline Islands in Micronesia brought to light the fact that traditional stellar navigational methods were still very much in everyday use there. The building and testing of proa canoes (wa) inspired by traditional designs, the harnessing of knowledge from skilled Micronesians, as well as voyages using stellar navigation, allowed practical conclusions about the seaworthiness and handling capabilities of traditional Polynesian canoes and allowed a better understanding of the navigational methods that were likely to have been used by the Polynesians and of how they, as people, were adapted to seafaring. Recent re-creations of Polynesian voyaging have largely used Micronesian methods and the teachings of a Micronesian navigator, Mau Piailug.

Anthropologist and historian Ben Finney built Nalehia, a 40-foot (12 m) replica of a Hawaiian double canoe. Finney tested the canoe in a series of sailing and paddling experiments in Hawaiian waters. In 1973, he established the Polynesian Voyaging Society to test the contentious question of how Polynesians found their islands. The team claimed to be able to replicate ancient Hawaiian double-hulled canoes capable of sailing across the ocean using strictly traditional voyaging techniques.

In 1978, the Hōkūleʻa was capsized en route to Tahiti. Eddie Aikau, a world champion surfer, and part of the crew, attempted to paddle his surfboard to the nearest island to find help. He was never seen again, but the crew was rescued.

In 1980, a Hawaiian named Nainoa Thompson invented a new method of non-instrument navigation (called the "modern Hawaiian wayfinding system"), enabling him to complete the voyage from Hawaiʻi to Tahiti and back. In 1987, Matahi Whakataka-Brightwell and his mentor Francis Cowan sailed from Tahiti to New Zealand without instruments in the waka Hawaiki-nui.

In New Zealand, a leading Māori navigator and ship builder was Hector Busby, who was also inspired and influenced by Nainoa Thompson and Hokulea's voyage there in 1985.

In 2008, the Lapita expedition sailed two catamarans from their construction in the Philippines to Tikopia and Anuta, Polynesian outliers of the Solomon Islands. British-based catamaran designers Hanneke Boon and James Wharram closely followed the hull shape of the traditional Tikopia craft, as represented by Rakeitonga, a 9 m outrigger canoe acquired by the Auckland Museum in 1916. The expedition used Polynesian navigation to sail along the coast of Northern New Guinea and then sailed 150 miles to an island for which they had modern charts, proving that it is possible to sail a modern catamaran along the path of the Lapita Pacific migration. The 'Lapita Tikopia' and its sistership 'Lapita Anuta' took five months to sail to the islands, following the ancient migration route of the Lapita people into the Pacific. This voyage of maritime archaeology culminated in the gift of these boats to the islanders, with the intention of ending " an era of being cut off from the surrounding islands and their extended family connections" and allowing deep-sea fishing once more. Unlike many other modern Polynesian "replica" voyages, the Wharram catamarans were at no point towed or escorted by a modern vessel with modern GPS navigation system, nor were they fitted with a motor.

In 2010, O Tahiti Nui Freedom, an outrigger sailing canoe, retraced the path of the Polynesian migration by sailing from Tahiti to China via the Cook Islands, Tonga, Fiji, Vanuatu, Solomons, Papua New Guinea, Palau, and the Philippines in 123 days.

In 2013, a modern, non-instrument voyage was launched called Mālama Honua. It traveled across the world leaving Hilo, Hawaii, initially. This was not a re-creation of a known historical voyage. The spirit of the voyage was to spread the message of conservation. In fact, "mālama honua" means, roughly, to care for Earth, in Hawaiian. The journey was made on two vessels: the Hōkūle'a and the Hikianalia. Nainoa Thompson was on the crew.

== See also ==
- Fautasi – Samoan longboat
- Māori migration canoes
