= Hōkūleʻa =

Polynesian double-hulled voyaging canoe

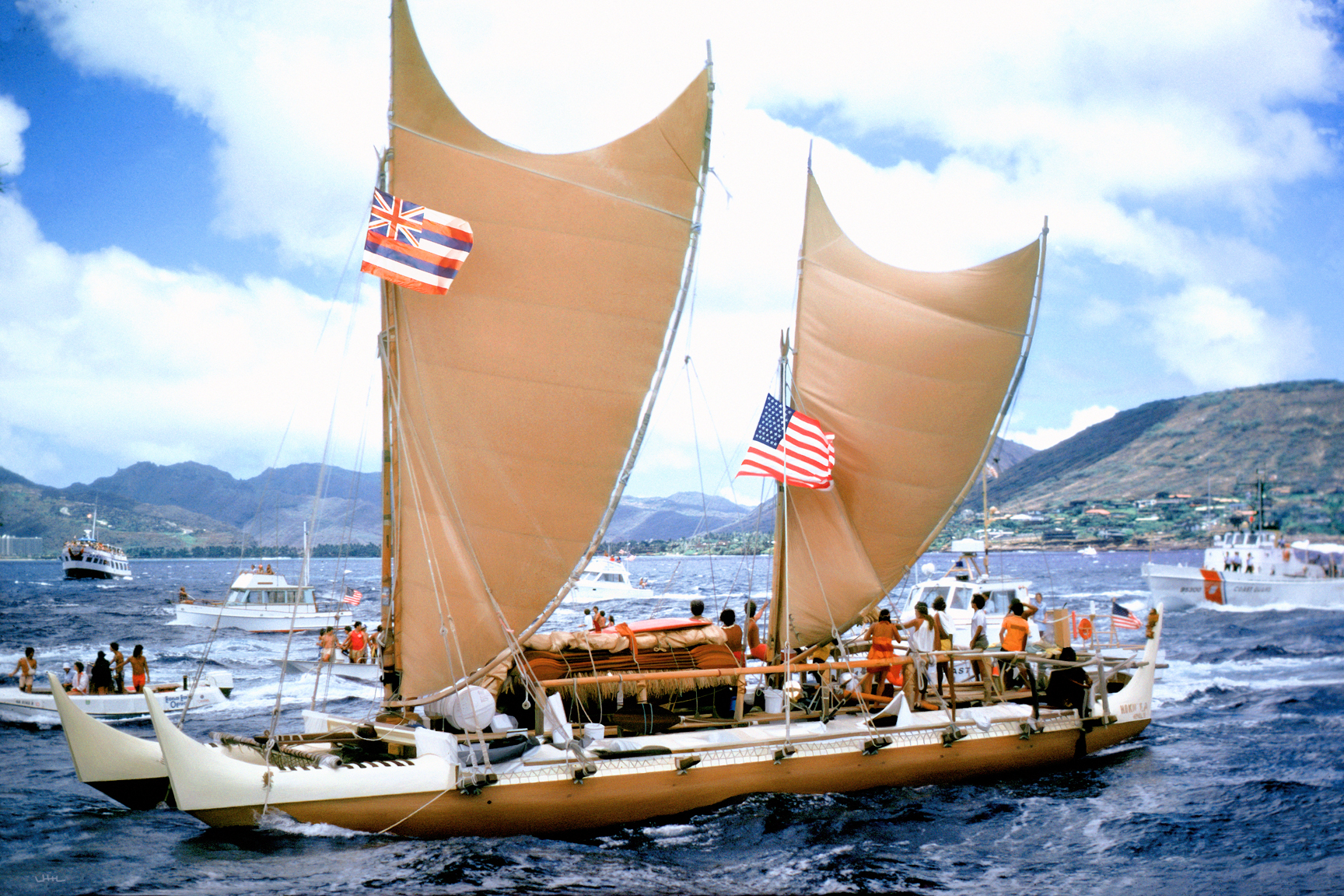
- Hōkūleʻa arrival in Honolulu from Tahiti in 1976

History

Hawaiʻi, United States
- Name: Hōkūleʻa
- Namesake: The star Hōkūleʻa (Arcturus), which travels directly above the latitude of Hawaiʻi
- Owner: Polynesian Voyaging Society
- Launched: 8 March 1975
- Identification: MMSI number: 376616230; Callsign: WDH4295
- Status: Active
- Notes: A reconstruction of a traditional Hawaiian bluewater vessel

General characteristics
- Class & type: waʻa kaulua
- Displacement: 27,000 lb (12 t)
- Length: 62 1/3 ft (19.0 m) overall
- Beam: 17.5 ft (5.3 m)
- Draught: 2.5 ft (0.76 m)
- Propulsion: Sail
- Sail plan: waʻa kaulua, crabclaw sails
- Complement: 12
- Notes: Hōkūleʻa has, in the past, been Bermuda-rigged for some passages.

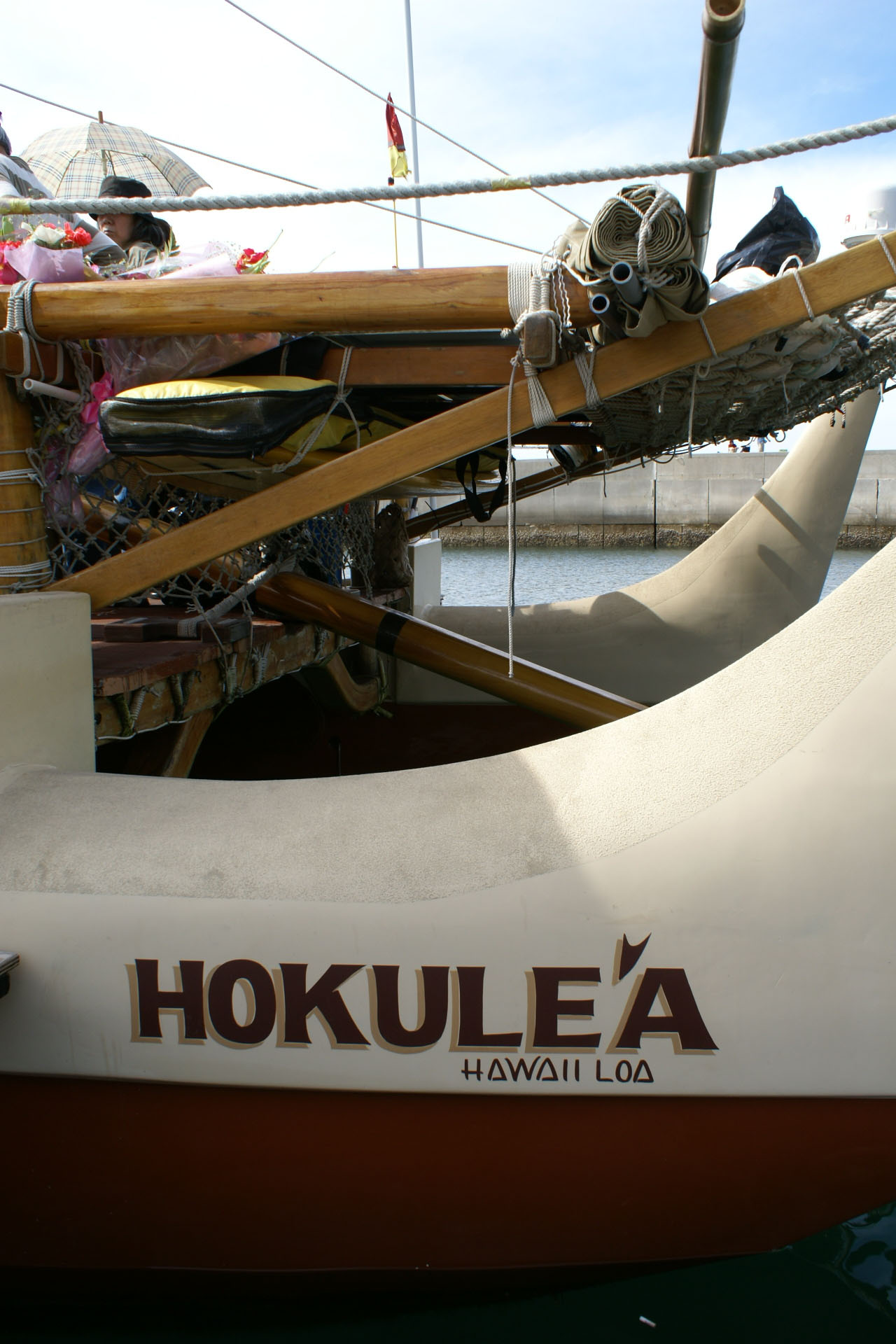
Stern of portside hull and center steering oar

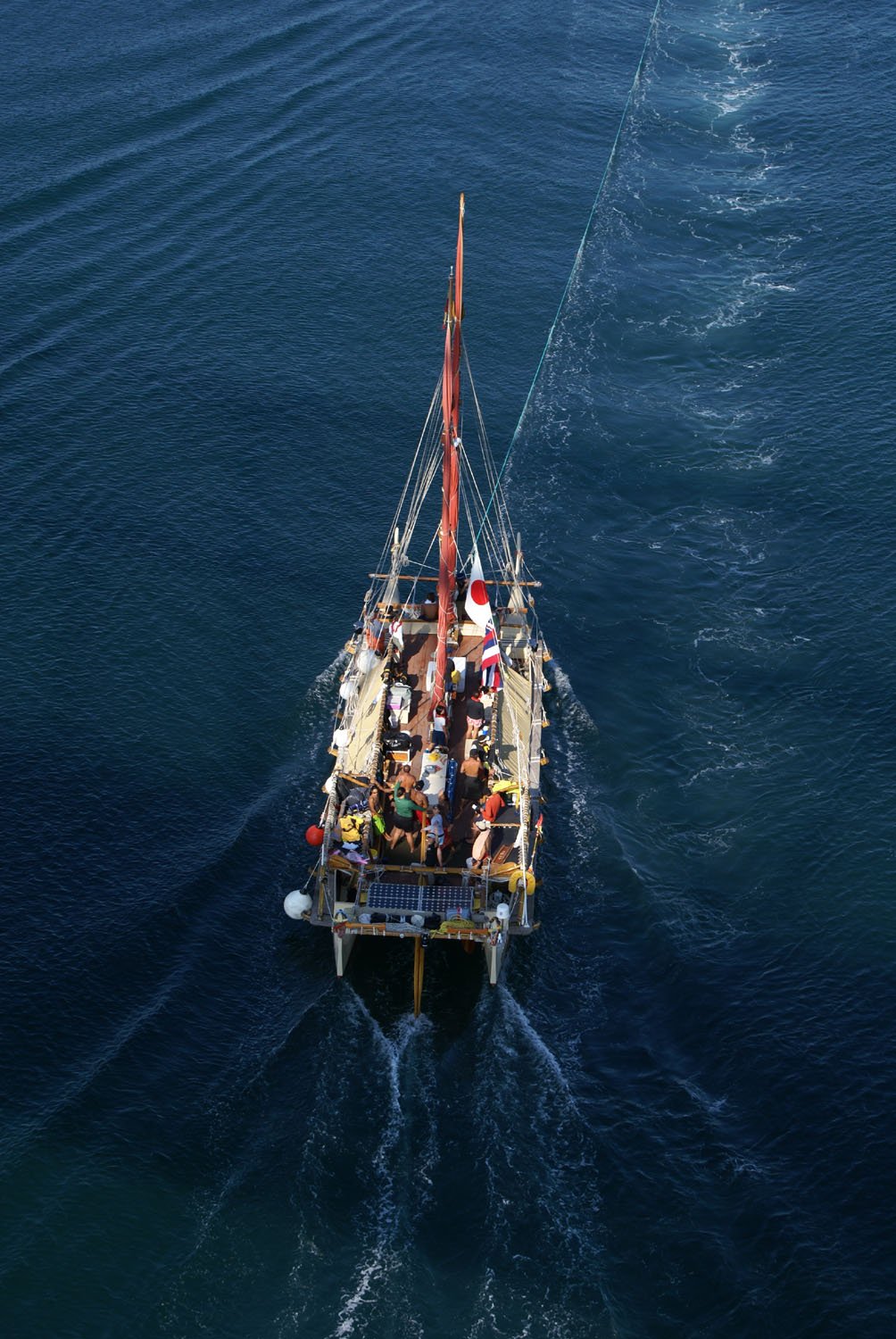
Hōkūle‘a, under tow, in Ōshima channel, Yamaguchi-prefecture, Japan

Hōkūleʻa (Hawaiian pronunciation: [ˈhoːkuːleʔɐ]) is a performance-accurate waʻa kaulua, a Polynesian double-hulled voyaging canoe. Launched on 8 March 1975 by the Polynesian Voyaging Society, it is best known for its 1976 Hawaiʻi to Tahiti voyage completed with exclusively traditional navigation techniques. The primary goal of the voyage was to explore the anthropological theory of the Asiatic origin of native Oceanic people (Polynesians and Hawaiians in particular) as the result of purposeful trips through the Pacific Ocean, as opposed to passive drifting on currents or sailing from the Americas. DNA analysis supports this theory. A secondary project goal was to have the canoe and voyage "serve as vehicles for the cultural revitalization of Hawaiians and other Polynesians."

Between the 1976 voyage and 2009, Hōkūle‘a completed nine additional voyages to Micronesia, Polynesia, Japan, Canada and the mainland United States, all using ancient wayfinding techniques of celestial navigation. On 19 January 2007, Hōkūle‘a left Hawaiʻi with the voyaging canoe Alingano Maisu on a voyage through Micronesia (map) and ports in southern Japan. The voyage was expected to take five months. On 9 June 2007, (Note: Due to the International Date Line, the voyage was completed on 8 June, Hawaiʻi time.) Hōkūle‘a completed the "One Ocean, One People" voyage to Yokohama, Japan. On 5 April 2009, Hōkūle‘a returned to Honolulu following a roundtrip training sail to Palmyra Atoll, undertaken to develop skills of potential crewmembers for Hōkūle‘a's eventual circumnavigation of the Earth.

On 18 May 2014 Hōkūle‘a and its sister vessel, Hikianalia, embarked from Oahu for "Malama Honua," a three-year circumnavigation of the earth. It returned to port in Hawaii on 17 June 2017. The journey covered 47,000 nautical miles with stops at 85 ports in 26 countries.

In between voyages, Hōkūle‘a is moored at the Marine Education Training Center (METC) of Honolulu Community College in Honolulu Harbor.

On 23 June 2023, Hōkūleʻa officially launched its 15th major voyage named Moananuiākea from Juneau, Alaska. The voyage will circumnavigate the entire Pacific Ocean and take four years to cover the 43,000 mile voyage. As of January 2026, Hōkūle'a is in Auckland, New Zealand undergoing routine maintenance mid-voyage.

== Construction ==
Polynesian voyaging canoes were made from wood, whereas Hōkūle‘a incorporates plywood, fiberglass and resin. Hōkūle‘a measures 61 feet 5 inches (18.7 m) LOA, 15 feet 6 inches (4.72 m) at beam, displaces 16,000 pounds (7,260 kg) when empty and can carry another 11,000 pounds (4,990 kg) of gear, supplies and 12 to 16 crew. Fully laden, with its 540-square-foot (50.2 m^{2}) sail area, it is capable of speeds of 4 to 6 knots (5 to 7 mph; 7 to 10 km/h).

Wright Elemakule Bowman Sr., a Hawaiian master woodcarver had built the crossbars for the hull. The twin wood masts were built by LeVan Keola Sequeira. They are rigged either crab claw or Marconi style with a small jib. It is steered with a long paddle. It has no auxiliary motor. Its escort vessel tows it into harbor when necessary. Its name means "star of gladness" in Hawaiian, which refers to Arcturus, a guiding zenith star for Hawaiian navigators. Arcturus passes directly overhead at Hawaiʻi's latitude, helping sailors find the island.

== Pius "Mau" Piailug ==
Hōkūle‘a navigates without instruments. In 1975, no living Hawaiian knew the ancient techniques for blue water voyaging. To enable the voyage, the Polynesian Voyaging Society recruited the Satawalese Master Navigator Mau Piailug (of the Weriyeng school in the Caroline Islands (map) of the Federated States of Micronesia (map)) to share his knowledge of non-instrument navigation. While as many as six Micronesian navigators had mastered these traditional methods as of the mid-1970s, only Mau was willing to share his knowledge.

Mau, who "barely spoke English", decided that by reaching beyond his own culture, sharing what had been closely guarded knowledge, he could possibly save it from extinction. Through this collaboration, Mau's mentorship helped "spark pride in the Hawaiian and Polynesian culture", leading to "a renaissance of voyaging, canoe building, and non-instrument navigation that has continued to grow, spreading across Polynesia (map) and reaching to its far corners of Aotearoa, New Zealand and Rapanui, Easter Island".

== Voyages ==
=== Inaugural voyage (1976) ===
Led by Captain Elia David Kuʻualoha "Kawika" Kapahulehua^{*} and Navigator Pius "Mau" Piailug, a Carolinian master navigator^{*}, Hōkūleʻa departed Honolua Bay, Maui, Hawaiʻi for Papeʻete, Tahiti, (voyage map) as part of the celebration of the United States Bicentennial. Mau navigated from Hawaii to Tahiti without instruments. Due to a conflict between crew members which escalated into physical violence, Mau abruptly returned home to Micronesia after reaching Tahiti. Hōkūleʻa had to be navigated back using western instruments (compass, nautical charts, sextant, chronometer, dividers, parallel rulers, pencil, nautical almanac).

On board the inaugural voyage was Hoku, a golden hair Hawaiian Poi Dog backbred by Jack L. Throp of the Honolulu Zoo. Razor-backed pigs and Polynesian chickens were also bred at the zoo for the voyage, but the director would not part with them at the last minute. Instead, the voyage hurriedly brought a white domesticated pig from Kōkeʻe, Kauai named Maxwell, and a cock and hen. The purpose of the animals was to study how to feed and care for these animals, which had been transported by the Polynesians during their voyages.

Honolua Bay, Maui, Hawaiʻi (map), United States – Papeʻete, Tahiti (map), Society Islands (map), French Polynesia (map)
1 May 1976 to 4 June 1976
The crew for this leg was as follows: 'Navigator: Mau Piailug; Captain: "Kawika" Kapahulehua; Crew: Clifford Ah Mow^{*}, Milton "Shorty" Bertelmann, Ben R. Finney, Charles Tommy Holmes^{*}, Sam Kalalau^{*}, Boogie Kalama, Buffalo Keaulana, John Kruse, Douglas "Dukie" Kuahulu^{*}, David Henry Lewis^{*}, David B. K. "Dave" Lyman III^{*}, William "Billy" Richards, Rodo Tuku Williams.^{*}
Papeʻete, Tahiti, French Polynesia – Hawaiʻi, United States
5 July 1976 to 26 July 1976
The crew for the return voyage was: Navigator: James "Kimo" Lyman; Captain: "Kawika" Kapahulehua; Crew: Abraham "Snake" Ah Hee, Andy Espirto^{*}, Mel Kinney, Francis Kainoa Lee, Gordon Piʻianaiʻa, Leonard Puputauiki, Penny Rawlins, Keani Reiner^{*}, Charles Nainoa "Nainoa" Thompson, Maka'ala Yates, Ben Young.

=== Kealaikahiki project (1977) ===
In English, the Hawaiian "Ke ala i kahiki" means "the path to Tahiti." The "Kealaikahiki Project" recreated the traditional Kealaikahiki Point departure of ancient voyages to Tahiti. Gordon Piʻianaiʻa's idea to recreate traditional departures took Hōkūleʻa southeast, across Kealaikahiki Channel between Lānaʻi and Kahoʻolawe Islands, past Kealaikahiki Point, into the ʻAlenuihāhā Channel and the northeast trade winds. The object was to determine whether Hōkūleʻa, departing from west of the 1976 departure point, would bisect the more easterly 1976 voyage track, and so likely reach Tahiti were it to continue. After heading south for two days, Hōkūleʻa did not bisect the 1976 voyage track, but likely would have (further south than anticipated). It came about and returned to Hawaiʻi. The traditional departure point would be used for subsequent sailings to Tahiti.

==== Legs ====
- Honolulu, Oʻahu – Manele Bay, Lānaʻi – Kealaikahiki Point, Kahoʻolawe, Hawaiʻi (map), United States – a point at sea, ninety miles south of Ka Lae, Hawaiʻi Island – Honolulu, Hawaiʻi, United States: 1 April 1977 to 10 April 1977

===== Crew =====
Navigator: Nainoa Thompson; Captain: Dave Lyman; Crew: Teené Froiseth, Sam Kaʻai, Sam Kalalau, John Kruse, "Kimo" Lyman, Jerome "Jerry" Muller, Gordon Piʻianaiʻa, Norman Piʻianaiʻa, Michael A. Tongg^{*}, Makaʻala Yates

=== Tahiti voyage (1978) ===
Following the 1976 voyage, Nainoa Thompson attempted to teach himself how to navigate without instruments, using only the position of stars and ocean cues, based on information he learned from books, planetarium observations, and short voyages in Hawaiian waters. In 1978, the crew of Hōkūleʻa attempted a second voyage to Tahiti, which was aborted when Hōkūleʻa capsized in high wind and seas southwest of the Island of Molokaʻi, five hours after departing Honolulu's Ala Wai Harbor. The crew hung on to the capsized canoe through the night.

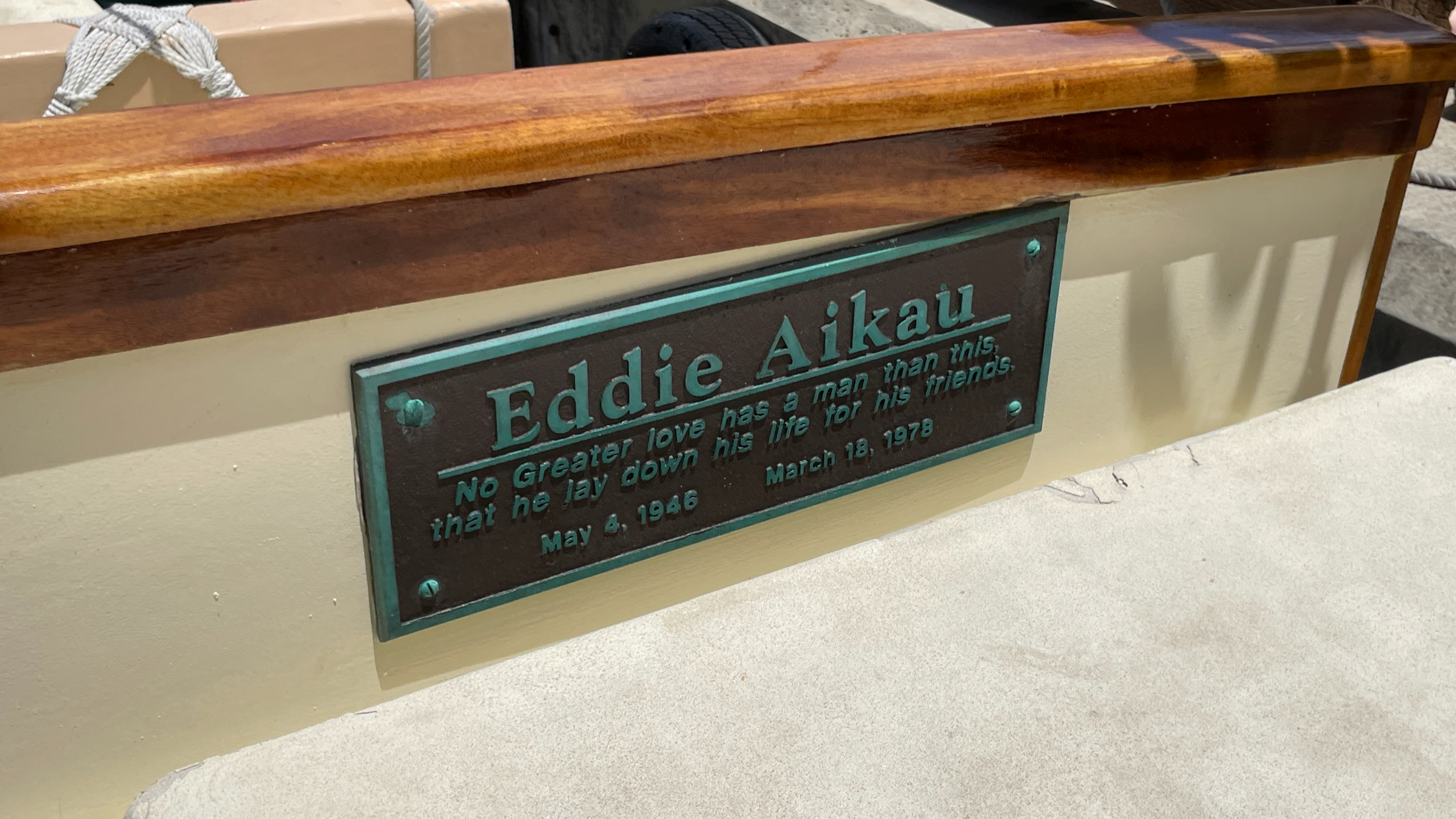
Plaque honoring Eddie Aikau's sacrifice aboard Hokule'a

Flares were unseen by passing aircraft; the emergency radio reached no help. By mid-morning, with no sign of imminent rescue and the capsized canoe drifting farther from land, Eddie Aikau, a North Shore, Oʻahu, lifeguard and big-wave surfer, volunteered to paddle a surfboard 12–15 miles (19–24 km) to Lānaʻi for help. About nine hours later, flares launched by the crew were spotted by a Hawaiian Airlines flight which circled Hōkūleʻa and radioed the United States Coast Guard (USCG). Half an hour later, a USCG search and rescue helicopter was hovering overhead; Hōkūleʻa crew was rescued. The following morning, the USCGC Cape Corwin towed the vessel, from 22 miles southwest of Lāʻau Point, Molokaʻi, back to Honolulu. Despite intensive land, air and sea search, Eddie Aikau was never seen again. Hōkūleʻa carries a plaque in his memory. Subsequent voyages were accompanied by an escort vessel. The event is documented in the 2013 ESPN film Hawaiian: The Legend of Eddie Aikau.

==== Ala Wai Harbor, Honolulu, Hawaiʻi, United States bound for Papeʻete, Tahiti, French Polynesia: 16 March 1978 to 18 March 1978 (recovery followed by USCG investigation) ====
Navigator: Nainoa Thompson; Captain: Dave Lyman; First Mate: Leon Paoa Sterling^{*}; "Snake" Ah Hee, Edward Ryon Makua Hanai "Eddie" Aikau^{*}, Charman Akina, M.D., Wedemeyer Au, Bruce Blankenfeld, Kilila Hugho, Sam Kaʻai, John Kruse, Marion Lyman, (Note: Later Marion Lyman-Mersereau) Buddy McGuire, Norman Piʻianaiʻa, Curt Sumida, Teikiheʻepo "Tava" Taupu.

=== Tahiti voyage (1980) ===
After the 1978 disaster, Mau returned and gave Nainoa further training on traditional navigation techniques. In 1980, Nainoa Thompson recreated the 1976 voyage to Tahiti to become the first Native Hawaiian in modern times to navigate a canoe thousands of miles without instruments. Mau sailed as an observer. After 29 days at sea, before sighting Mataiva on the way to Tahiti, Mau offered Nainoa only one correction; of Nainoa's interpretation of sighting a land-based seabird in mid-morning flight. Such birds generally fly seaward for food at morning and return to land in the evening. While it can usually be assumed that land lies opposite the birds' morning flight direction, this bird spotted mid-morning (during nesting season), carried a fish in its beak. (Note: Nainoa explains in Wayfinding that Mau had not previously shared this detail. The delicacy of Mau's signal reading demonstrates the navigator's intimate connection to his environment.) This detail suggested to Mau that the bird's morning flight was not away from land but toward it. The bird was not flying seaward to find more fish, but rather, was returning to land, to feed its young. (Note: In Wayfinding, Dennis Kawaharada quotes Nainoa Thompson sharing knowledge of how to read birds for navigation, learned from Mau.) Leading up to the voyage, an extensive, formal crew training program helped to ensure a safe voyage. Escort boat Ishka followed for safety.

==== Hilo, Hawaiʻi Island, United States – Papeʻete, Tahiti, Society Islands, French Polynesia: 15 March 1980 to 17 April 1980 ====
Navigator: Nainoa Thompson; Captain: Gordon Piʻianaiʻa; Chad Kalepa Baybayan, "Shorty" Bertelmann, Harry Ho, Sam Kaʻai, Michael "Buddy" McGuire, Marion Lyman-Mersereau, Mau Piailug, Steve Somsen, Joanne Kahanamoku Sterling^{*}, Leon Paoa Sterling, "Tava" Taupu; Patrick Koon Hung Piʻimauna Charles "Pat" Aiu, MD^{*}

==== Papeʻete, Tahiti, French Polynesia – Honolulu, Hawaiʻi, United States: 13 May 1980 to 6 June 1980 ====
Navigator: Nainoa Thompson; Captain: Gordon Piʻianaiʻa; Wedemeyer Au, Chad Baybayan, Bruce Blankenfeld, "Snake" Ah Hee, John Kruse, Kainoa Lee, James "Kimo" Lyman, Mau Piailug, Steven Somsen, Leon Paoa Sterling, Michael Tongg, Nathan Wong.

=== Voyage of Rediscovery (1985–1987) ===
In the "Voyage of Rediscovery", Hōkūleʻa traveled 12,000 miles (19,000 km) to destinations throughout Polynesia. Inviting fellow Polynesians to join the crew on legs of the voyage extended Hōkūleʻa's success in revitalizing interest in Polynesian culture. For instance, professional Tongan sea captain Sione Taupeamuhu was aboard during a night passage from Tongatapu to Nomuka in the northerly Haʻapai Islands group of Tonga (map). He was skeptical that Hōkūleʻa navigator Nainoa Thompson could find Nomuka without instruments. When Nomuka appeared on the horizon at dawn as anticipated, Taupeamuhu remarked, "Now I can believe the stories of my ancestors." Dorcas and Maalea served as escort vessels.

==== Hawaiʻi Island, United States – Papeʻete, Society Islands, French Polynesia: 10 July 1985 to 11 August 1985 ====
Navigator: Nainoa Thompson; Captain: "Shorty" Bertelmann; Crew: Clay Bertelmann^{*}, Dennis Chun, Richard Tai Crouch, Harry Ho, Dr. Larry Magnussen, "Buddy" McGuire, Mau Piailug, Thomas Reity (Satawal), James Shizuru, "Tava" Taupu.

==== Papeʻete, Tahiti, French Polynesia – Rarotonga, Cook Islands (map): 30 August 1985 to 14 September 1985 ====
Navigator: Nainoa Thompson; Captain: Gordon Piʻianaiʻa; Crew: "Snake" Ah Hee, Dr. Pat Aiu, Chad Baybayan, Karim Cowan (Tahiti), Bob Krauss, John Kruse, Vic Lipman, Mel Paoa, Mau Piailug, Abraham Piʻianaiʻa, Chad Piʻianaiʻa, Michael Tongg, Andrew Tutai (Cook Islands), Peter Sepelalur (Satawal), Leon Paoa Sterllng, Puaniho Tauotaha (Tahiti), Cliff Watson. (Bob Krauss, journalist; Karim Cowan, and Puaniho Tauotaha were crew members only from Tahiti to Raʻiatea)

==== Rarotonga, Cook Islands – Waitangi, North Island, New Zealand (map): 21 November 1985 to 7 December 1985 ====
Navigator: Nainoa Thompson; Captain and 1st Watch Captain: "Shorty" Bertelmann; 2nd Watch Captain: Leon Paoa Sterling; 3rd Watch Captain: "Tava" Taupu (Marquesas); Crew: Dr. Pat Aiu, Chad Baybayan, Bruce Blankenfeld, Stanley Conrad (New Zealand), Dr. Ben Finney, Harry Ho, "Buddy" McGuire, "Billy" Richards, James Shizuru, Michael Tongg

==== Waitangi, New Zealand – Nukuʻalofa, Tongatapu Island, Kingdom of Tonga : 1 May 1986 to 11 May 1986 ====
Navigator: Nainoa Thompson; Captain: Leon Paoa Sterling; Crew: "Snake" Ah Hee, Dr. Pat Aiu, Carlos Andrade, Chad Baybayan, Philip Ikeda*, John Keolanui, "Kimo" Lyman, Mau Piailug, Scott Sullivan, Michael Tongg, Sione Uaine Ula (Tonga)

==== Nukuʻalofa, Tonga – Pago Pago, Tutuila Island, American Samoa (map): 23 May 1986 to 25 May 1986 ====
Navigator: Nainoa Thompson; Captain: Leon Paoa Sterling; Crew: Dr. Pat Aiu, Carlos Andrade, Gilbert Ane, Gail Evenari (California), Chad Baybayan, Hector Busby (New Zealand), Philip Ikeda*, Sam Kaʻai, John Keolanui, "Kimo" Lyman, Mau Piailug, Scott Sullivan, Jo Anne Sterling, Sione Taupeamuhu (Tonga), Michael Tongg, Sione Uaine Ula (Tonga)

==== Ofu Island, American Samoa – Aitutaki, Cook Islands: 7 July 1986 to 16 July 1986 ====
Navigator: Nainoa Thompson; Captain: "Shorty" Bertelmann; Crew: Clay Bertelmann, Harry Ho, Pauahi Ioane, Bernard Kilonsky, Ben Lindsey, Mel Paoa, Mau Piailug, Tua Pittman (Cook Islands), "Tava" Taupu (Marquesas)

==== Aitutaki – Rarotonga: 10 August 1986 to 11 August 1986 ====
Navigator and Captain: Nainoa Thompson; Crew: Dr. Pat Aiu, Chad Baybayan, Dede Bertelmann, Bruce Blankenfeld, "Wally" Froseith, Pauahi Ioane, "Jerry" Muller, Mau Piailug, Tua Pittman (Rarotonga), Rio Tuiravakai (Aitutaki), Raukete Tuiravakai (Aitutaki)

==== Rarotonga, Cook Islands – Tautira, Tahiti Iti, Society Islands, French Polynesia: 12 August 1986 to 21 August 1986 ====
Navigator and Captain: Nainoa Thompson; Crew: "Snake" Ah Hee, Dr. Pat Aiu, Chad Baybayan, Bruce Blankenfeld, Wallace "Wally" Froiseth, Harry Ho, Glen Oshiro, Mau Piailug, Richard Rhodes, Michael Tongg, Aaron Young

==== Tautira – Papeʻete, Tahiti Nui – Tautira: 27 March 1987 to 29 March 1987 ====
Navigator and Captain: Nainoa Thompson; Crew: U.S. Senator Daniel Akaka, Chad Baybayan; "Wally" Froiseth, Harry Ho, Kilo Kaina, Michele Kapana, Will Kyselka, Russell Mau, Honolulu City Councilman Arnold Morgado; Abraham Piʻianaiʻa, Tutaha Salmon (Tahiti), Cary Sneider (California), "Tava" Taupu (Marquesas), Michael Tongg, Aaron Young. Senator Akaka and Councilman Morgado joined the crew in Papeʻete.

==== Tautira, Tahiti Iti, Society Islands – Rangiroa Atoll, Tuamotus (map): 2 April 1987 to 4 April 1987 ====
Navigator and Captain: Nainoa Thompson; Crew; Chad Baybayan, Clay Bertelmann, "Wally" Froiseth, Rey Jonsson, Solomon Kahoʻohalahala, Will Kyselka, Charles Larson, Mel Paoa, Cary Sneider (California), "Tava" Taupu, Tracy Tong, Michael Tongg, Clifford Watson, Dr. Nathan Wong, Elisa Yadao, Aaron Young

==== Rangiroa, Tuamotus, French Polynesia – Kualoa, Oʻahu (map), Hawaiʻi, United States: 24 April 1987 to 23 May 1987. ====
Navigator: Nainoa Thompson; Captain: "Shorty" Bertelmann; Crew: "Snake" Ah Hee, Dr. Pat Aiu, Chad Baybayan, Bruce Blankenfeld, Stanley Conrad (New Zealand), Eni Hunkin (Samoa), Tua Pittman (Cook Islands), Dixon Stroup, Puaniho Tauotaha (Tahiti), Sione Taupeamuhu (Tonga), "Tava" Taupu (Marquesas), Michael Tongg, Clifford Watson, Elisa Yadao

=== No Nā Mamo ('For the Children') (1992) ===
Hōkūleʻa sailed to Tahiti, Raʻiatea, and on to Rarotonga for the Sixth Festival of Pacific Arts, then, via Tahiti, sailed back to Hawaiʻi. This voyage, known as "No Nā Mamo" or "For the Children", was designed to train a new generation of voyagers to sail Hōkūleʻa, to share values and knowledge of voyaging and to celebrate the revival of canoe building and non-instrument navigation. The voyage included an educational component allowing Hawaiian students to track the progress of the canoe through daily radio reports. Kama Hele escorted the voyage.

==== Honaunau, Hawaiʻi Island, United States – Papeʻete, Tahiti, Society Islands, French Polynesia: 17 June 1992 to 15 July 1992 ====
Crew: Nainoa Thompson, Sailing master; Chad Baybayan, Co-navigator; "Shorty" Bertelmann, Co-navigator; Clay Bertelmann, Captain; Nailima Ahuna, Fisherman; Dennis J. Chun, Historian; Maulili Dixon, Cook; Kainoa Lee; Liloa Long; Jay Paikai; Chadd Kaʻonohi Paishon; Ben Tamura, M.D.; "Tava" Taupu.

==== Papeʻete – Raʻiatea: 10 September 1992 to 16 September 1992 ====
Crew: Nainoa Thompson, Sailing master; Chad Baybayan, Navigator; Keahi Omai, Navigator; "Billy" Richards, Captain; Gilbert Ane; John Eddy, Film Documentation; Clement "Tiger" Espere^{*}; Brickwood Galuteria, Communications; Harry Ho; Sol Kahoohalahala; Dennis Kawaharada, Communications; Reggie Keaunui; Keone Nunes, Oral Historian; Eric Martinson; Nalani Minton, Traditional Medicine; Esther Mookini, Hawaiian Language; Mel Paoa; Cliff Watson, Film Documentation; Nathan Wong, M.D.

==== Raʻiatea, Society Islands, French Polynesia – Mauke, Cook Islands – Aitutaki – Rarotonga: 20 September 1992 to 16 October 1992 ====
Crew: Nainoa Thompson, Sailing master; Chad Baybayan, Navigator; Gordon Piʻianaiʻa, Captain; Moana Doi, Photo Documentation; John Eddy, Film Documentation; Ben Finney, Scholar; "Wally" Froseith, Watch Captain; Brickwood Galuteria, Communications; Harry Ho; Kaʻau McKenney; Keahi Omai; Keone Nunes, Oral Historian; "Billy" Richards, Watch Captain; Cliff Watson, Film Documentation. Cook Islands Additional Crew: Clive Baxter (Aitutaki); Tura Koronui (Atiu); Dorn Marsters (Aitutaki); Tua Pittman (Rarotonga); Nga Pouʻaʻo (Mitiaro); Maʻara Tearaua (Mangaia); Peʻia Tuaʻati (Mauke).

==== Rarotonga, Cook Islands – Papeʻete, Tahiti, Society Islands, French Polynesia – Honaunau, Hawaiʻi Island, United States: 26 October 1992 to 1 December 1992 ====
Co-navigators: Bruce Blankenfeld, "Kimo" Lyman; Captain: Michael Tongg; Sailing Master: Nainoa Thompson; Watch Captain and Cook: "Snake" Ah Hee; Watch Captain: Aaron Young; Ship's Doctor: Pat Aiu, M.D; Historian: Carlos Andrade; Fisherman: Terry Hee; Communications: Scott Sullivan; Crew: Archie Kalepa, Suzette Smith, Wallace Wong, Gary Yuen.

=== Nā ʻOhana Holo Moana ('The Voyaging Families of the Vast Ocean') (1995) ===
==== Spring voyage segment ====
In the spring, Hōkūleʻa, along with sister ships Hawai‘iloa and Makali‘i, sailed from Hawaiʻi to Tahiti. They participated in a gathering of voyaging canoes from across Oceania at nearby Marae Taputapuatea, Raʻiatea, which led to the lifting of a six-centuries-old tapu on voyaging from Raʻiatea. Then all the canoes returned to Tahiti, sailed to Nuku Hiva in the Marquesas and on to Hawaiʻi. This was only the first part of a voyage spanning spring and summer known as "Nā ʻOhana Holo Moana" or The Voyaging Families of the Vast Ocean. Hōkūleʻa was escorted by Gershon II under Steve Kornberg; Rizaldar, under Randy Wichman, also escorted.

==== Hilo, Hawaiʻi Island, United States – Papeʻete, Tahiti, Society Islands, French Polynesia: 11 February 1995 to 4 March 1995 ====
Sailing Master: Nainoa Thompson; Navigators: Kaʻau McKenney, Keahi Omai; Crew: Shantell Ching, Junior Coleman, Catherine Fuller, Harry Ho, Mau Piailug, Sesario Sewralur (son of Mau Piailug), Ben Tamura, MD; "Tava" Taupu, Michael Tongg, Kamaki Worthington. After Hōkūleʻa sighted Tikehau on 2 March 1995, Navigators Kaʻau McKenney and Keahi Omai turned over navigation to their apprentices, Junior Coleman and Sesario Sewralur, who guided the vessel to landfall in Papeʻete, Tahiti.

==== Tautira, Tahiti – Fare, Huahine – Marae Taputapuatea, Raʻiatea – Tahaʻa – Tautira, Tahiti: 16 March 1995 to 24 March 1995 ====
The crew may be the same as on the previous leg, but this is speculation.

==== Tautira, Tahiti, Society Islands – Taiohae Bay, Nuku Hiva, Marquesas Islands: 6 April 1995 to 15 April 1995 ====
Navigator and Captain: Chad Baybayan;

==== Taiohae Bay, Nuku Hiva, Marquesas, French Polynesia – Hilo, Hawaiʻi Island, United States: 20 April 1995 to 7 May 1995 ====
Navigator and Captain: Chad Baybayan; Co-assistant navigators: Moana Doi, Piʻikea Miller; Watch Captains: "Snake" Ah Hee, "Tava" Taupu, Michael Tongg; Medical Officer: Mel Paoa; Fisherman and Teacher: Nainoa Thompson; Cook: Gary Yuen; Crew: Clyde Aikau, Sam Pautu, Mau Piailug, Sesario Sewralur, Gary Suzuki

==== Summer voyage segment ====
In the summer: Hōkūleʻa and Hawai‘iloa sailed the West Coast of the United States. Both vessels were shipped from Hawaiʻi to Seattle, Washington, after which they sailed to Vancouver, British Columbia. They visited intermediate ports, where local American Indian tribes often hosted them to a dinner and gift exchange. From Vancouver, Hawai‘iloa sailed as far north as Haines, Alaska. (Note: Hawai‘iloa was built of traditional materials, with the sponsorship of the Bishop Museum's Native Hawaiian Culture and Arts Program in response to the Hōkūleʻa voyages' revival of interest in Native Hawaiian culture. But no healthy koa trees large enough for its hulls could be found in Hawaiʻi's forests. This dilemma led to action to help Hawaiʻi's environment including planting koa seedlings for future generations, because traditional Hawaiian culture and Hawaiʻi's environment interdepend. (See Sam Low, Sacred Forests on Polynesian Voyaging Society web site, Accessed 7 August 2008 quoting Nainoa Thompson about "Mālama Hawaiʻi") So, to build Hawai‘iloa without having to wait several centuries for the koa to grow, the Polynesian Voyaging Society accepted a gift of two enormous 400-year-old Sitka spruce logs from the forests of the Tsimshian, Haida, and Tlingit Native Alaskans. Hawai‘iloa's voyage through Southeast Alaska was to thank these people for their kindness and to recognize their contribution to Hawaiian native culture (See Northwest-Alaska 1995 Home on Polynesian Voyaging Society web site, Accessed 7 August 2008)) Hōkūleʻa sailed south to San Diego via Portland, Oregon, and the California ports of San Francisco, Santa Barbara, and Long Beach. The voyaging canoes were shipped back to Hawaiʻi: Hōkūleʻa from San Pedro; Hawai‘iloa from Seattle. This summer part of the voyage promoted cultural and educational exchanges with Hawaiians (some of whom had never been to Hawaiʻi), Native Americans, and other people living on the United States West Coast.

Crew: Captains: Gordon Piʻianaiʻa, "Kimo" Lyman, Michael Tongg, Chad Baybayan; Crew: Gil Ane, Beth Atuatasi (née Saurer), Moana Doi, Laulima Lyman, Leon Sterling, Matthew Tongg

==== Stops in the Puget Sound and Straits of Georgia and Juan de Fuca area ====
Hōkūleʻa visited:

- Pier 57, Seattle, Washington, United States: 19 May 1995 to 26 May 1995
  Hōkūleʻa crew participated in National Maritime Week festivities and shared a dinner hosted by the Muckleshoot, Puyallup, Suquamish nations and Wayfinders of the Pacific.
- Golden Gardens, Shilshole Bay: 27 May 1995 to 28 May 1995
  A potlatch with First Nations was shared with hoʻolauleʻa (celebration); Hōkūleʻa supported the Polynesian Youth Games hosted by Seattle Parks and Recreation
- Chinook Landing Marina, Puyallup Nation, Tacoma: 28 May 1995 to 1 June 1995
  As well as sharing educational outreach and cultural exchange, crew shared in a luau.
- Suquamish Reservation: 1 June 1995 to 2 June 1995
- Lummi Nation, Bellingham: 3 June 1995 to 4 June 1995
- Squalicum Harbor, Bellingham: 5 June 1995
- Swinomish Reservation, Skagit, Washington, United States: 6 June 1995
- Vancouver Maritime Museum, Vancouver, British Columbia, Canada: 7 June 1995 to 8 June 1995
  Exchange with the Assembly of First Nations
- Makah Nation, Neah Bay, Washington, United States: 9 June 1995 to 11 June 1995

==== Neah Bay – Portland, Oregon: 12 June 1995 to 15 June 1995; Columbia River ====
Hōkūleʻa visited:

- Kalama, Washington where crew shared a dinner with Kalama ʻOhana: 16 June 1995
- Fort Vancouver, Washington public dock where Hōkūleʻa was part of a festival and the rededication of Kanaka Village: 17 June 1995 to 20 June 1995

==== Portland, Oregon – San Francisco, California: 21 June 1995 to 29 June 1995 ====
Hōkūleʻa visited:

- Hyde Street Pier arrival for 1 July 1995 welcoming ceremony and festival at Crissy Field, 2 July 1995 Long Boat Regatta on the bay, Hawaiian music concert and Polynesian festival at Lawrence Hall of Science.

==== San Francisco – Santa Barbara: 3 July 1995 to 9 July 1995 ====
Hōkūleʻa visited:

- Santa Barbara Harbor Marina: 10 July 1995 to 11 July 1995, interchange with the Santa Barbara Outrigger Canoe Club, Cousteau Institute, and the Santa Barbara Museum of Natural History

==== Santa Barbara – Long Beach: 11 July 1995 to 12 July 1995 ====
Hōkūleʻa visited:

- Gabrieleño/Tongva Tribal Council, Kalifornia Outrigger Association, Hawaiian Civic Clubs, the Rapa Nui Outrigger Club, and the City of Long Beach, on 12 July 1995;
- A two-day symposium with scholars, scientists, and master artisans called Century of the Pakipika, 13 July 1995 to 14 July 1995;
- A Hawaiian and Pacific Island Festival with teachers' workshops, the annual Long Beach Hoʻolauleʻa Canoe Regatta and a farewell dinner and ceremonies, 13 July 1995 to 19 July 1995

==== Long Beach – San Diego: 20 July 1995 ====
Hōkūleʻa visited:

- Embarcadero, San Diego, there was a welcoming ceremony, 22 July 1995,
- A Hawaiian and Pacific Islands festival, and an exhibition, called:
- Hale Naua, or "Turning Back the Sky," at the San Diego Museum of Man, 23 July 1995 to 25 July 1995

=== Closing the Triangle (1999–2000) ===
Hōkūleʻa sailed from Hawaiʻi to Rapa Nui (Easter Island) and back, via the Marquesas Islands of French Polynesia. While in the Marquesas, short trips were made between principal islands of the group (map). A brief stop was made at Pitcairn Island on the Mangareva – Rapa Nui leg. A technically challenging voyage due to Rapa Nui's isolation and location over 1,000 miles upwind; it is known as "Closing the Triangle" because it took the canoe to the southeastern Pacific for the first time. Kama Hele escorted the voyage.

==== Hilo, Hawaiʻi Island, United States – Nuku Hiva, Marquesas Islands, French Polynesia: 15 June 1999 to 13 July 1999 ====
Navigator and Captain: Bruce Blankenfeld; Apprentice Navigator: Piʻikea Miller; Watch Captains: Dennis Chun, Terry Hee, Leon Paoa Sterling; Crew: Russell Amimoto, Desmon Antone, Darcy Attisani, Kekama Helm, Kaʻau McKenney, Atwood Makanani, Hauʻoli Smith, Wallace Wong

==== Nuku Hiva – Ua Pou – Ua Huka – Tahuata – Fatu Hiva – Hiva Oa – Mangareva, Gambier Islands: 2 August 1999 to 29 August 1999 ====
Navigator and Captain: Chad Baybayan; Apprentice Navigators: Moana Doi, Catherine Fuller; Student Navigator: Aldon Kim; Watch Captains: Terry Hee, Mel Paoa, "Tava" Taupu; Protocol Officer: Kaniela Akaka; Crew: Tim Gilliom, Kealoha Hoe, Aeronwy Polo, Mona Shintani, Gary Suzuki, Nalani Wilson, Gary Yuen

==== Mangareva, French Polynesia – Pitcairn, Pitcairn Islands – Rapa Nui (Easter Island), Territory of Chile: 21 September 1999 to 9 October 1999 ====
Navigator and Captain: Nainoa Thompson; Navigators: Bruce Blankenfeld, Chad Baybayan; Medical Officer: Ben Tamura, MD; Photographer and Videographer: Sonny Ahuna; Crew: Shantell Ching, Terry Hee, Mel Paoa, "Tava" Taupu, Michael Tongg, Max Yarawamai, Aaron Young

==== Rapa Nui (Easter Island), Territory of Chile – Tahiti, French Polynesia: 9 November 1999 to 3 December 1999 ====
Navigator: Bruce Blankenfeld; Captain: "Wally" Froiseth; Crew: Naʻalehu Anthony, Bob Bee, Blane Chong, Dennis Chun, Terry Hee, Nalani Kaneakua, Kawika Crivello, Kealoha Hoe, "Kimo" Lyman, Kawai Warren, Kamaki Worthington

==== Tahiti, French Polynesia – Kaunakakai, Molokaʻi, Hawaiʻi, United States: 5 February 2000 to 27 February 2000 ====
Navigator: Nainoa Thompson; Navigator: Shantell Ching; Crew: "Snake" Ah Hee, Chad Baybayan, Pomaikalani "Pomai" Bertelmann, Bruce Blankenfeld, Sam Low, Joey Mallot, Kahualaulani Mick, Kaʻiulani Murphy, Kauʻi Pelekane, "Tava" Taupu, Michael Tongg, Dr. Patrice Ming-Lei Tim Sing, Kona Woolsey

=== Navigating Change (2003–2004) ===
In 2003, Hōkūleʻa sailed to Nīhoa, the closest of the "leeward," or Northwestern Hawaiian Islands (maps: small and large scale), to set the stage for the 2004 voyage to the furthest, most westerly of them, Kure Atoll. Hōkūleʻa's 2004 voyage took the canoe through the area now comprising the Papahānaumokuākea Marine National Monument to promote stewardship and awareness of this area. Hōkūleʻa participated in an interagency initiative with this voyage named after it, called "Navigating Change". Upon reaching the remote islands, the crew helped remove hundreds of pounds of washed-up fishing nets that threatened Hawaiian monk seals and Hawaiian Green sea turtles and also helped with plant conservation. About 1,600 schoolchildren linked to the vessel by daily satellite phone calls. Teachers prepared with curriculum guides, video and web resources. Navigating Change was supported by US Fish & Wildlife Service, Polynesian Voyaging Society, Bishop Museum, National Oceanic and Atmospheric Administration, Hawai'i Department of Education, Hawai'i Department of Land and Natural Resources, Hawaiʻi Maritime Center, University of Hawaiʻi, The Nature Conservancy, Western Pacific Regional Fishery Management Council, Coastal Zone Management Hawaiʻi, National Fish and Wildlife Foundation, Harold K.L. Castle Foundation and the Pacific American Foundation. Kama Hele escorted the voyage.

==== Oahu – Kauaʻi: 7 September 2003 to ? ====
Captain: Bruce Blankenfeld; Crew: Carey Amimoto, Anela Benson, Leimomi Dierks, Timmy Gilliom, Kiki Hugho, Nohea Kaiaokamalie, Jerry Muller, Dean Nikaido, Mel Paoa, Ronson Sahut, Jan TenBruggencate, Boyd Yap

==== Kauaʻi – Nīhoa: 9 September 2003 to ? ====
Captain: Nainoa Thompson; Crew: Russell Amimoto, Naʻalehu Anthony, Bruce Blankenfeld, Nohea Kaiaokamalie, Cindy Macfarlane, Mel Paoa, Jan TenBruggencate, Kana Uchino, Alex Wegman, ʻAulani Wilhelm

==== ʻ Harbor, ʻ, Hawaiʻi – ʻ, Kauaʻi: 2 May 2004 to 3 May 2004 ====
Navigator: Kaʻiulani Murphy; Captain: Russell Amimoto; Crew: Jan TenBruggencate,

==== ʻ Bay, Kauaʻi – Nīhoa Island – Tern Island, French Frigate Shoals – Laysan Island – Lisianski Island – Pearl and Hermes Atoll – Green Island, Kure Atoll – Midway Atoll: 23 May 2004 to 9 June 2004 ====
Navigator: Kaʻiulani Murphy; Captain: Nainoa Thompson; Sailing Master: Bruce Blankenfeld; Watch Captain: Russell Amimoto; Crew: Naʻalehu Anthony, Ann Bell; Leimomi Kekina Dierks, Randy Kosaki, Keoni Kuoha, Cherie Shehata, MD, "Tava" Taupu, Jan TenBruggencate, Kanako Uchino, Kaleo Wong

==== Midway Atoll – ʻ: 11 June 2004 to 22 June 2004 ====
Navigator: Bruce Blankenfeld; Captain: Mel Paoa; Terry Hee, Kealoha Hoe, Nohea Kaiaokamalie, Keoni Kuoha, Kaʻiulani Murphy, "Tava" Taupu, Mike Taylor, Gary Yuen

==== ʻ – ʻ, ʻ,: 23 June 2004 to 24 June 2004 ====
Captain: Russell Amimoto; Gerald Aikau

=== One Ocean, One People (2007) ===
The One Ocean, One People theme united two voyages in celebration of Pacific voyaging, Pacific Islands, and cultural ties, in passages to Micronesia and Japan. These voyages were named Kū Holo Mau and Kū Holo Lā Komohana. Kama Hele escorted the voyage.

==== Kū Holo Mau ====
Accompanied by the canoe Alingano Maisu and specialized escort boat Kama Hele, (photo below, in gallery) Hōkūleʻa sailed from Hawaiʻi to the Federated States of Micronesia, 23 January to 7 April 2007. This voyage is known as "Kū Holo Mau", or "Sail On, Sail Always, Sail Forever." While on the island of Satawal, the crew of the Hōkūleʻa presented the Alingano Maisu to Mau Piailug. While at Satawal, some Hōkūleʻa navigators who had proven their mastery of non-instrument sailing and navigation over many ocean passages were inducted into Pwo, pronounced "poh." This was the first Pwo ceremony on Satawal in five decades, and the first time Polynesians were inducted.

==== Kawaihae, Hawaiʻi Island, United States – Majuro, Republic of the Marshall Islands: 23 January 2007 to 18 February 2007 ====
Navigator and Captain: Bruce Blankenfeld; Watch Captains: Tim Gilliom, Attwood Makanani, Kaʻiulani Murphy; Medical Officer: Dr. Ben Tamura; Crew: Russell Amimoto, Bob Bee, Terry Hee, Nohea Kaiʻokamalie, Kaleo Wong, Palani Wright

==== Marshall Islands, Republic of the Marshall Islands – Federated States of Micronesia, Federated States of Micronesia: 21 February 2007 to 28 February 2007 ====
Navigator and Captain: Bruce Blankenfeld; Watch Captains: Tim Gilliom, Attwood Makanani, Kaʻiulani Murphy; Medical Officer: Dr. Gerald Akaka; Crew: Russell Amimoto, Terry Hee, Nohea Kaiʻokamalie, Gary Kubota, Kaleo Wong, Palani Wright

==== Pohnpei – Chuuk: 6 March 2007 to 9 March 2007 ====
Navigator and Captain: Nainoa Thompson; Watch Captains: Tim Gilliom, Attwood Makanani, Kaʻiulani Murphy; Medical Officer: Dr. Marjorie Mau; Crew: Naʻalehu Anthony, Pomai Bertelmann, Gary Kubota, Keoni Kuoha, Nick Marr, "Billy" Richards, Ana Yarawamai, Max Yarawamai, Pauline Yourupi

==== Chuuk – Satawal, Yap State: 11 March 2007 to 21 March 2007 ====
Navigator and Captain: Nainoa Thompson; Watch Captains: Tim Gilliom, Attwood Makanani, Kaʻiulani Murphy; Medical Officer: Dr. Marjorie Mau; Crew: Naʻalehu Anthony, Chad Baybayan, "Shorty" Bertelmann, Pomai Bertelmann, Bruce Blankenfeld, "Snake" Ah Hee, John Kruse, Gary Kubota, Keoni Kuoha, Nick Marr, "Billy" Richards, Ana Yarawamai, Max Yarawamai, Pauline Yourupi

==== Satawal – Woleai Atoll: 19 March 2007 to 21 March 2007 ====
Navigator and Captain: Nainoa Thompson; Watch Captains: Tim Gilliom, Attwood Makanani, Kaʻiulani Murphy; Medical Officer: Dr. Marjorie Mau; Crew: Naʻalehu Anthony, Chad Baybayan, "Shorty" Bertelmann, Pomai Bertelmann, Bruce Blankenfeld, "Snake" Ah Hee, John Kruse, Gary Kubota, Keoni Kuoha, Nick Marr, "Billy" Richards, Ana Yarawamai, Max Yarawamai, Pauline Yourupi

==== Woleai – Ulithi Atoll: 21 March 2007 to 23 March 2007 ====
Navigator: Kaʻiulani Murphy; Captain: Nainoa Thompson; Watch Captains: Tim Gilliom, Attwood Makanani; Medical Officer: Dr. Marjorie Mau; Crew: Naʻalehu Anthony, Chad Baybayan, Pomai Bertelmann, Gary Kubota, Keoni Kuoha, Nick Marr, "Billy" Richards, Ana Yarawamai, Max Yarawamai, Pauline Yourupi

==== Ulithi – Yap Island: 21 March 2007 to 23 March 2007 ====
Navigator and Captain: Nainoa Thompson; Watch Captains: Tim Gilliom, Attwood Makanani, Kaʻiulani Murphy; Medical Officer: Dr. Marjorie Mau; Crew: Naʻalehu Anthony, Chad Baybayan, Pomai Bertelmann, Bruce Blankenfeld, Dr. Thane Hancock, "Snake" Ah Hee, John Kruse, Gary Kubota, Keoni Kuoha, Nick Marr, "Billy" Richards, Ana Yarawamai, Max Yarawamai, Pauline Yourupi

==== Colonia, Yap Island, Federated States of Micronesia – Palau (map): 29 March 2007 to 31 March 2007 ====
Navigator and Captain: Nainoa Thompson; Watch Captains: Tim Gilliom, Attwood Makanani, Kaʻiulani Murphy; Medical Officer: Dr. Vernon Andsell; Crew: Aaron Akina, Naʻalehu Anthony, Pomai Bertelmann, Dennis Eric Co, Emily Fielding, Keoni Kuoha, Waimea McKeague, Tommy Remengesau (President of Palau), Pauline Sato, Patti Ann Solomon, Jennifer Yano

==== Palau – Colonia, Yap Island, Federated States of Micronesia: 5 April 2007 to 7 April 2007 ====
Navigator: Kaʻiulani Murphy; Captain: Naʻalehu Anthony; Watch Captains: Tim Gilliom, Attwood Makanani, Nainoa Thompson; Medical Officer: Dr. Vernon Andsell; Crew: Aaron Akina, Pomai Bertelmann, Dennis Eric Co, Emily Fielding, Keoni Kuoha, Waimea McKeague, Pauline Sato, Patti Ann Solomon

==== Kū Holo Lā Komohana ====
From Yap, the Hōkūleʻa sailed to Yokohama, Japan, from 11 April 2007 to 8 June 2007. Upon sighting Kyūshū, navigation of coastal and inland seas utilized landmarks and aids to navigation. From departure to landfall at Okinawa, Japan, Hōkūleʻa was guided by Nainoa Thompson. Chad Baybayan then guided the vessel to further stops at Amami, Uto, Nomozaki, Nagasaki, Fukuoka, Shinmoji marina in Moji-ku, Iwaishima and Suō-Ōshima (Ōshima). Nainoa Thompson resumed as captain for stops at Miyajima and Hiroshima (image). Bruce Blankenfeld took over for stops at Uwajima, Muroto, Miura and Kamakura before concluding the voyage in Yokohama. This voyage is known as "Kū Holo Lā Komohana", or Sail on to the Western Sun. While Hōkūleʻa was shipped back to Honolulu, escort vessel Kama Hele sailed back to Oʻahu under German Captain Mike Weindl with six Japanese crewmembers.

==== Yap, Federated States of Micronesia – Okinawa, Japan 11 April 2007 to 23 April 2007 ====
Navigator and Captain: Nainoa Thompson; Crew: Takuji Araki (Japan), Pomai Bertelmann, Timi Gilliom, Kaina Holomalia, Attwood Makanani, Kaʻiulani Murphy, Maile Neff, Chadd Kaʻonohi Paishon, Dr. Pete Roney, Kanaka Uchino (Japan).

==== Okinawa – Ōshima 28 April 2007 to 19 May 2007 ====
Captain: Chad Baybayan; Crew: Imaikalani P. Aiu, Takuji Araki, Kalepa "Kala" Baybayan, Stephanie M. Beeby, Anela K. Benson, Dennis J. Chun, Monte Costa, Derek Ferrar, Timmy Gilliom, Heidi K. Guth, Kaimi C. Hermosura, Kiyoko Ikeda, William Keala Kai, Attwood Makanani, Chadd Kaʻonohi Paishon, Makaʻala Rawlins, Dr. Cherie L. Shehata, Van K. Warren

==== Ōshima – Uwajima 26 May 2007 to 27 May 2007 ====
Navigator and Captain: Nainoa Thompson; Watch Captain: Kaʻiulani Murphy; Crew: Imaikalani P. Aiu, Takuji Araki, Nanea Baird, Stephanie M. Beeby, Anela K. Benson, Pomai Bertelmann, Dennis J. Chun, Monte Costa, Heidi K. Guth, Kaimi C. Hermosura, Kiyoko Ikeda, William Keala Kai, Attwood Makanani, Chadd Kaʻonohi Paishon, Dr. Cherie L. Shehata, Sky Takemoto, Kanako Uchino, Van K. Warren

==== Uwajima – Yokohama 3 June 2007 to 9 June 2007 ====
Navigator and Captain: Bruce Blankenfeld; Senior Officers: Norman Piʻianaiʻa, "Tava" Taupu; Watch Captain: Naʻalehu Anthony; Crew: Takuji Araki, Chris Baird, Dennis Kawaharada, Attwood Makanani, Dr. Cherie L. Shehata, Patti-Ann Solomon; Watch Captain: Kaʻiulani Murphy; Crew: Pomai Bertelmann, Dean Nikaido, Chadd Kaʻonohi Paishon, Leighton Tseu (representing the Royal Order of Kamehameha), Kanako Uchino, Kiyotsugu Yoshida (Sunset Films)

=== Malama Honua (worldwide voyage) (2014–2017) ===
==== Legs ====
- Polynesia, May 2014 – April 2015
  - Malama Hawaiʻi: Statewide Sail
  - Hawaiʻi – Tahiti
  - Tahiti – Samoa
  - Apia and Phoenix Islands
  - Tutuila to Aotearoa
  - Aotearoa I
- [Australia and] Indian Ocean, May 2015 – December 2016
  - Including Sydney
  - July 2015: Great Barrier Reef
  - August 2015: Bali
  - September 2015: Mauritius
  - November 2015: South Africa
- Atlantic and Caribbean, January 2016 – February 2016
  - January 2016 St. Helena, en route to Brazil
  - March 2016 US Virgin Islands in the Caribbean
  - March 2016 Havana, Cuba
- 'N. America & Canada', April 2016 – December 2016
  - April 2016 interior waterways of Florida
  - April 2016 NASA Kennedy Space Center
  - May 2016 Washington, D.C.
  - June 2016 New York City
  - June 2016 Rhode Island, Connecticut, Massachusetts, New Hampshire and Maine
  - July 2016 Mystic Seaport
  - July 2016 Martha's Vineyard
  - July 2016 Mt. Desert Island, Maine
  - August 2016 Nova Scotia and the Bay of Fundy
  - September 2016 (Great Lakes journey) Great Lakes and Ontario, Canada.
  - September 2016 Glens Falls, New York
  - October 2016 Virginia (dry docked for maintenance, and on display)
  - December 2016 Miami
  - December 2016 towards the Panama Canal
  - January 2017 'reached Panama this week'
- Pacific Return January 2017 – June 2017
  - January 2017 Back in the Pacific after two-day transit through the Panama Canal
  - February 2017 Galapagos
  - March 2017 Rapa Nui
  - April 2017 Tahiti
  - June 2017 Hawai‘i: Homecoming
  - Homecoming, Magic Island, Oʻahu, 17 June 2017.

=== Moananuiakea, a Voyage for Earth (2023–2027) ===
- The 43,000-nautical-mile, 47-month circumnavigation of the Pacific with the Hikianalia included an unplanned return to Hawaii to bring inspiration and warmth after the 2023 Hawaii wildfires. The navigator, Nainoa Thompson, gave a public talk, hosted by Loyola Marymount University in Los Angeles, while the canoe was docked in Marina del Rey, California.

==== Legs ====
- September–November 2023: West Coast of the United States
  - California: October–November 2023
    - Monterey Bay: 5–8 October
    - Morro Bay: 13–16 October
    - Ventura: 18–22 October
    - Marina del Rey: 24–30 October
    - Newport Beach: 30 October – 4 November
    - Dana Point: 4–8 November
    - San Diego: 8–14 November
- June–August 2025: French Polynesia

A re-launch occurred during favorable conditions in June 2025.

- Taputapuātea: 24 June
- Papeʻete: 28 June
- Mataiea: 6 July

- November 2025: New Zealand
  - Waitangi: 14 November

== Images ==
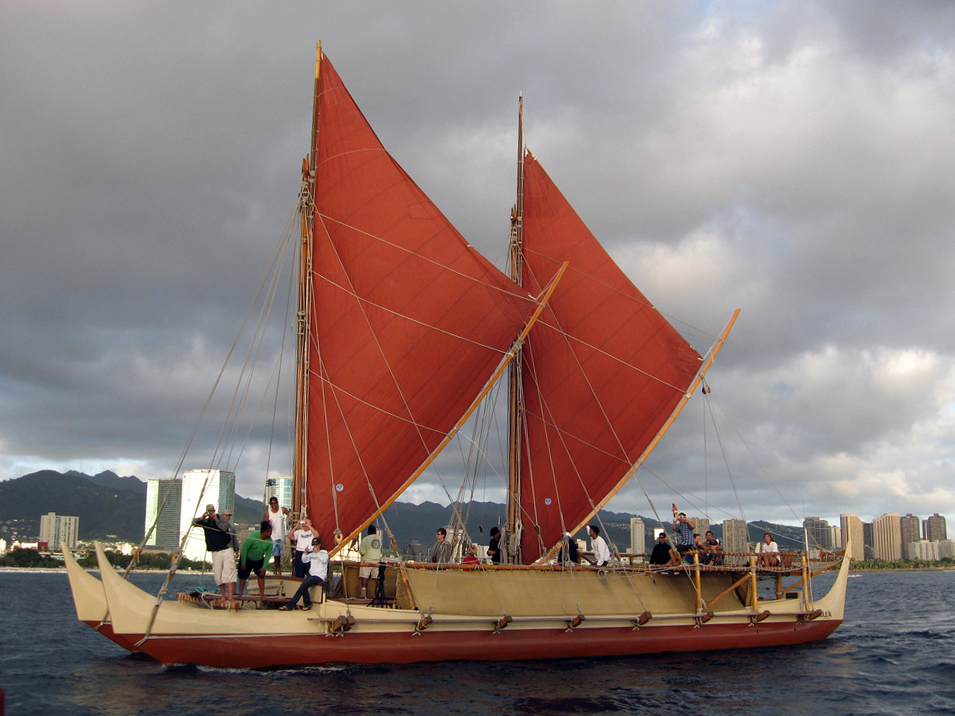
Hokule'a 2009

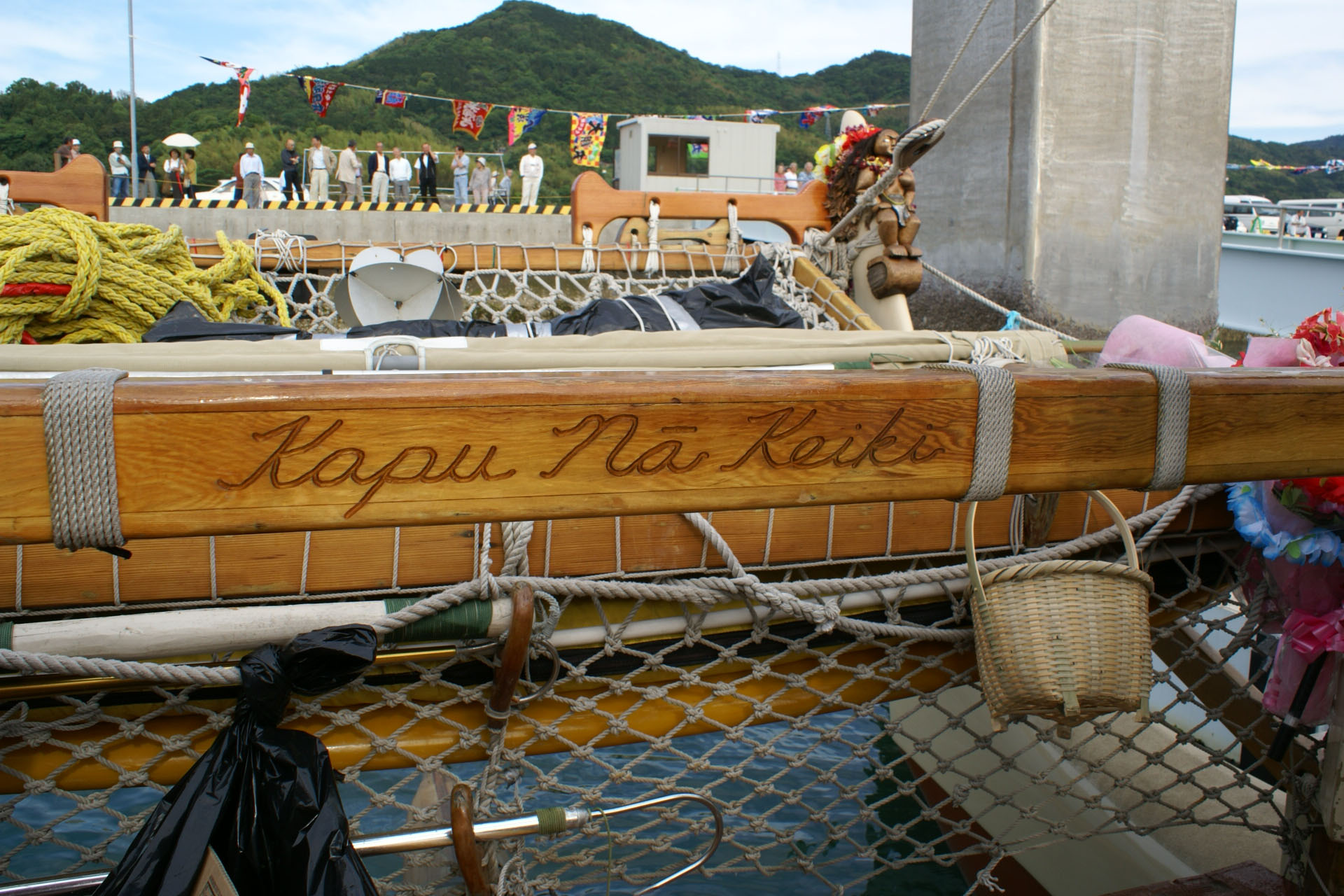
Motto, Kapu nā Keiki, engraved on a crossbeam of Hōkūle'a

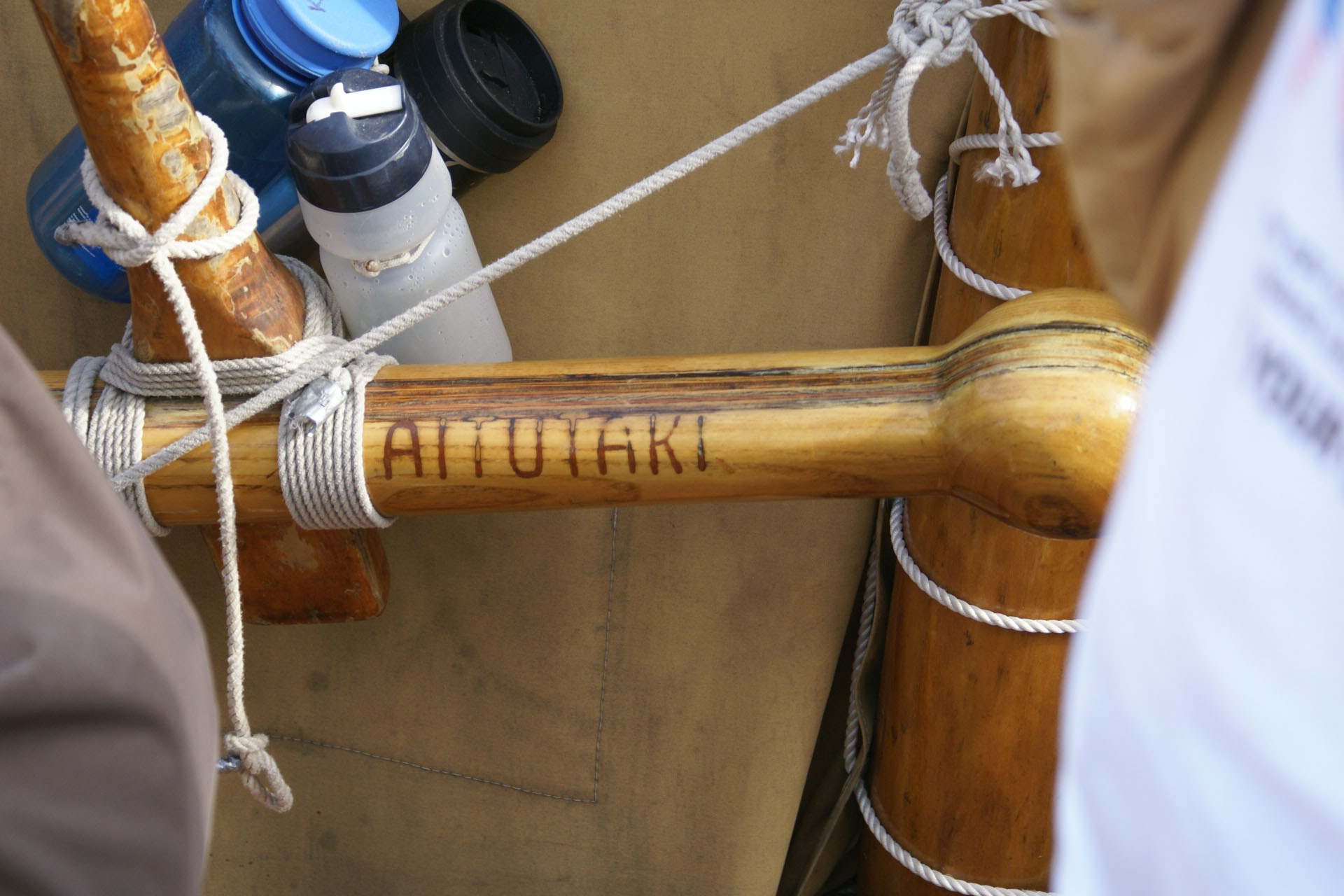
Steering sweep grip of portside

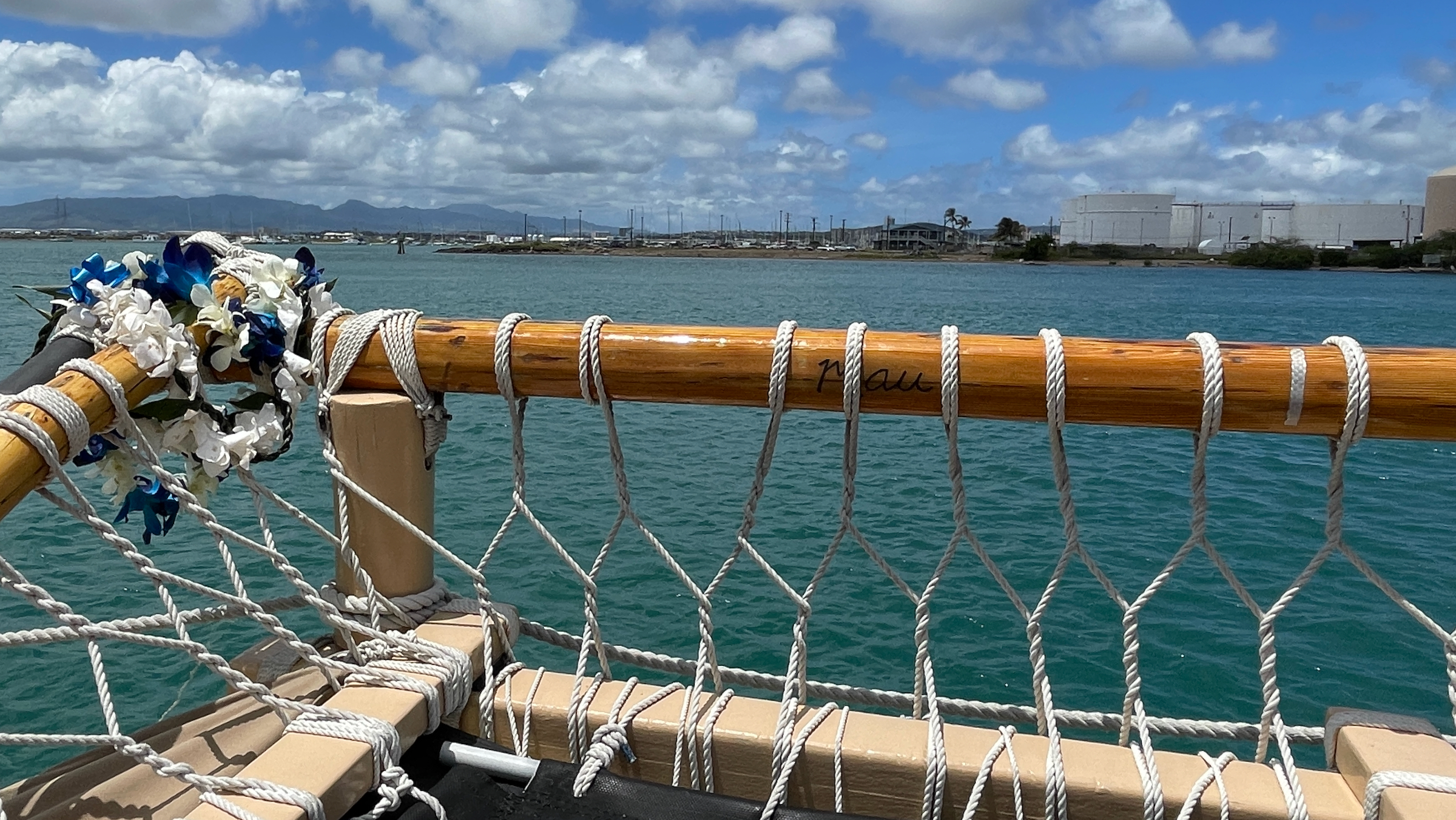
Mau's name carved into the rail at the navigator's seat on the port rear quarter of Hōkūle'a

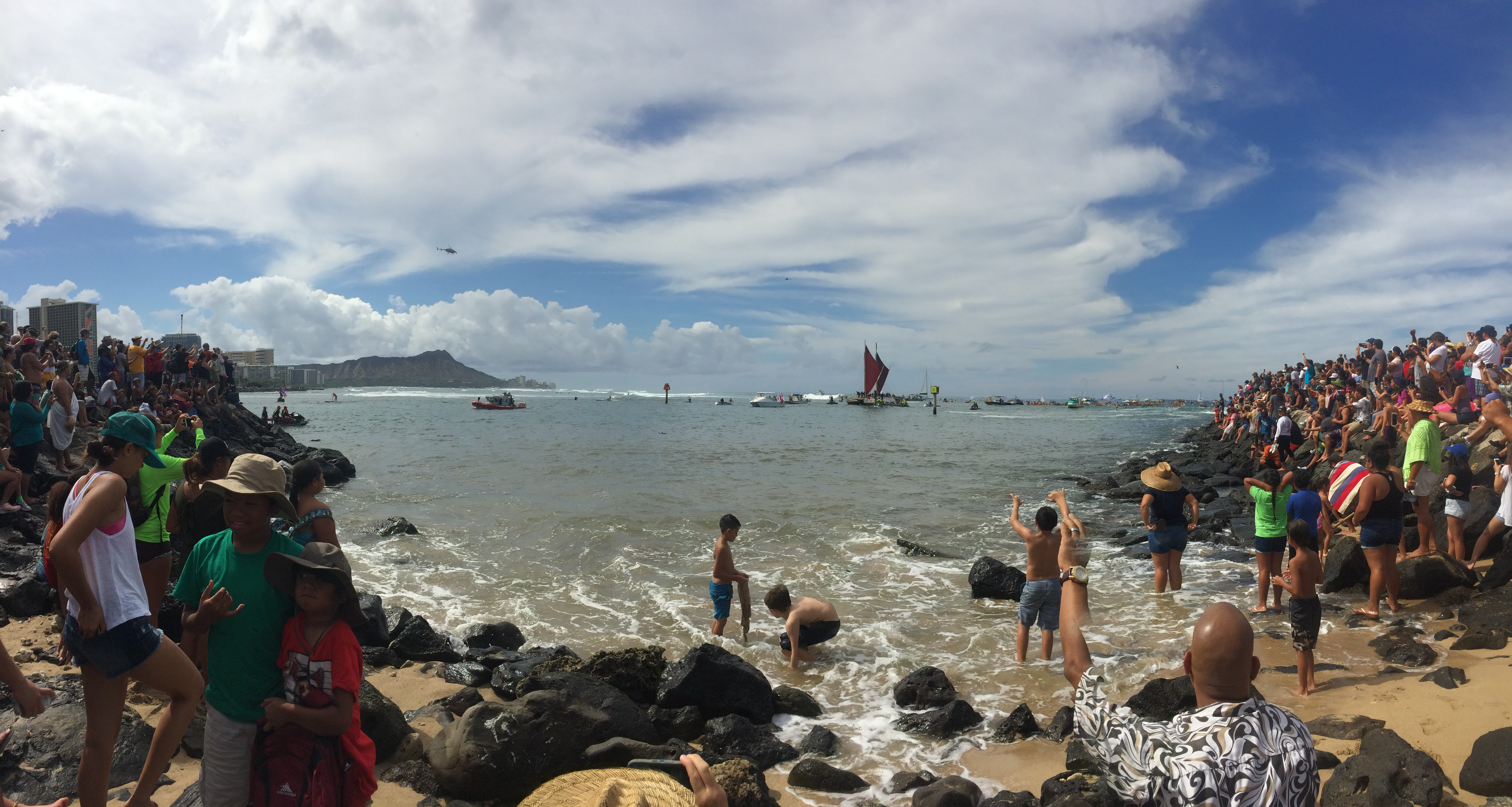
Thousands line the channel to welcome Hōkūle'a home from her worldwide voyage in June 2018

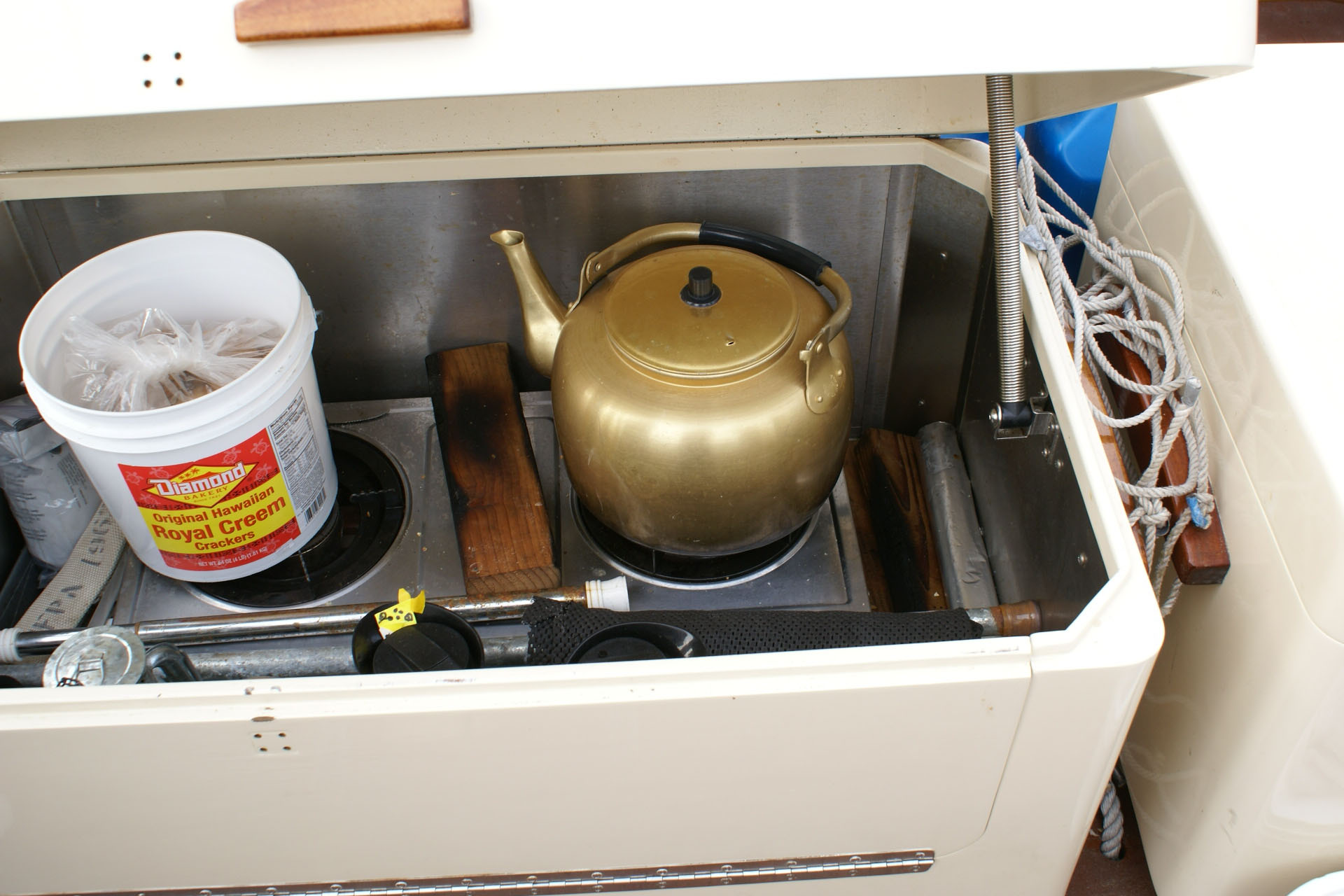
Galley

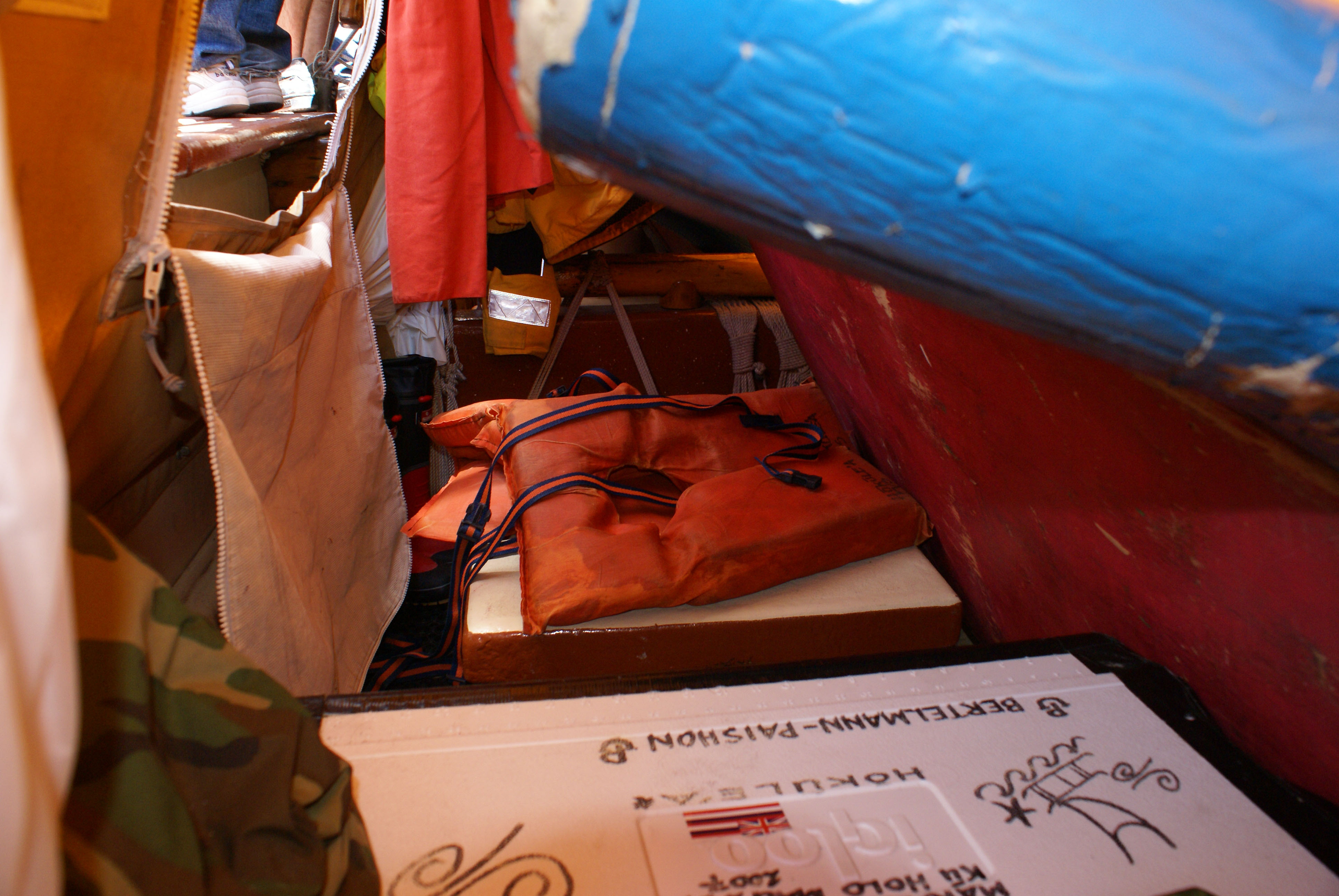
Inside a compartment

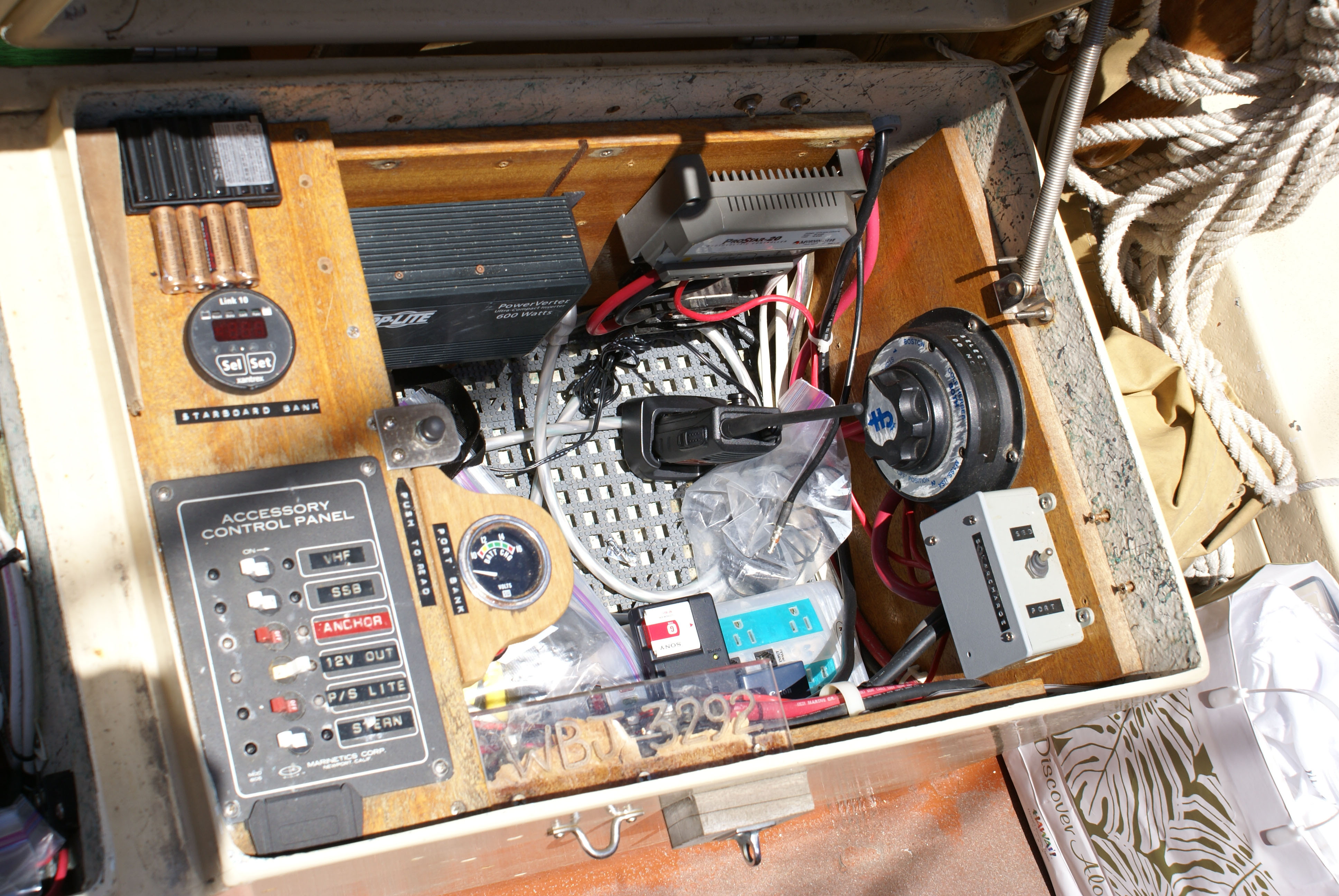
Radio system

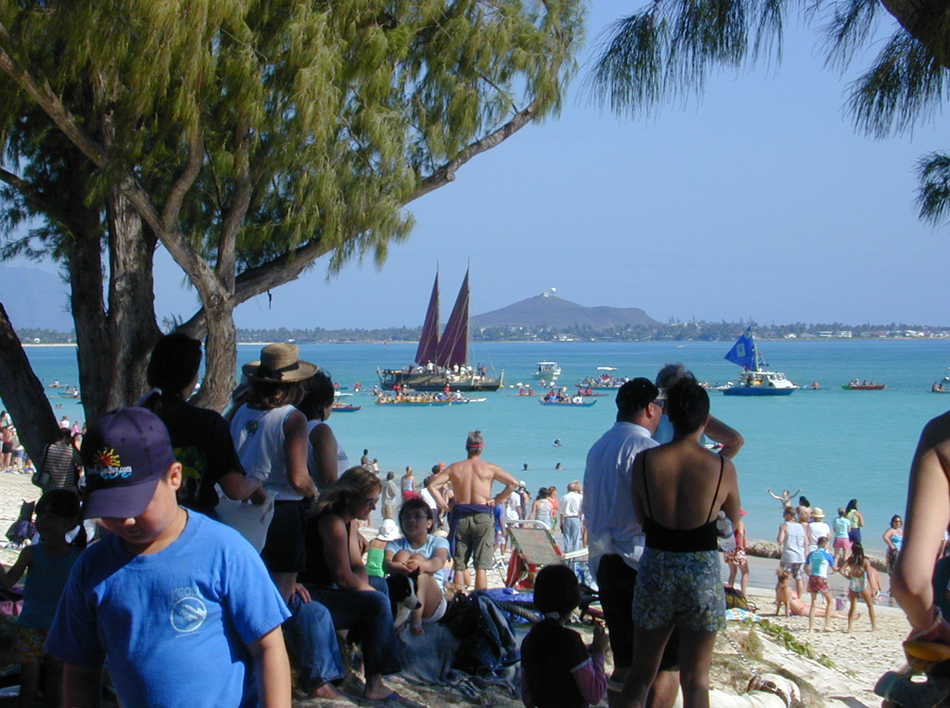
Hōkūle‘a at Kailua Beach, 1 May 2005

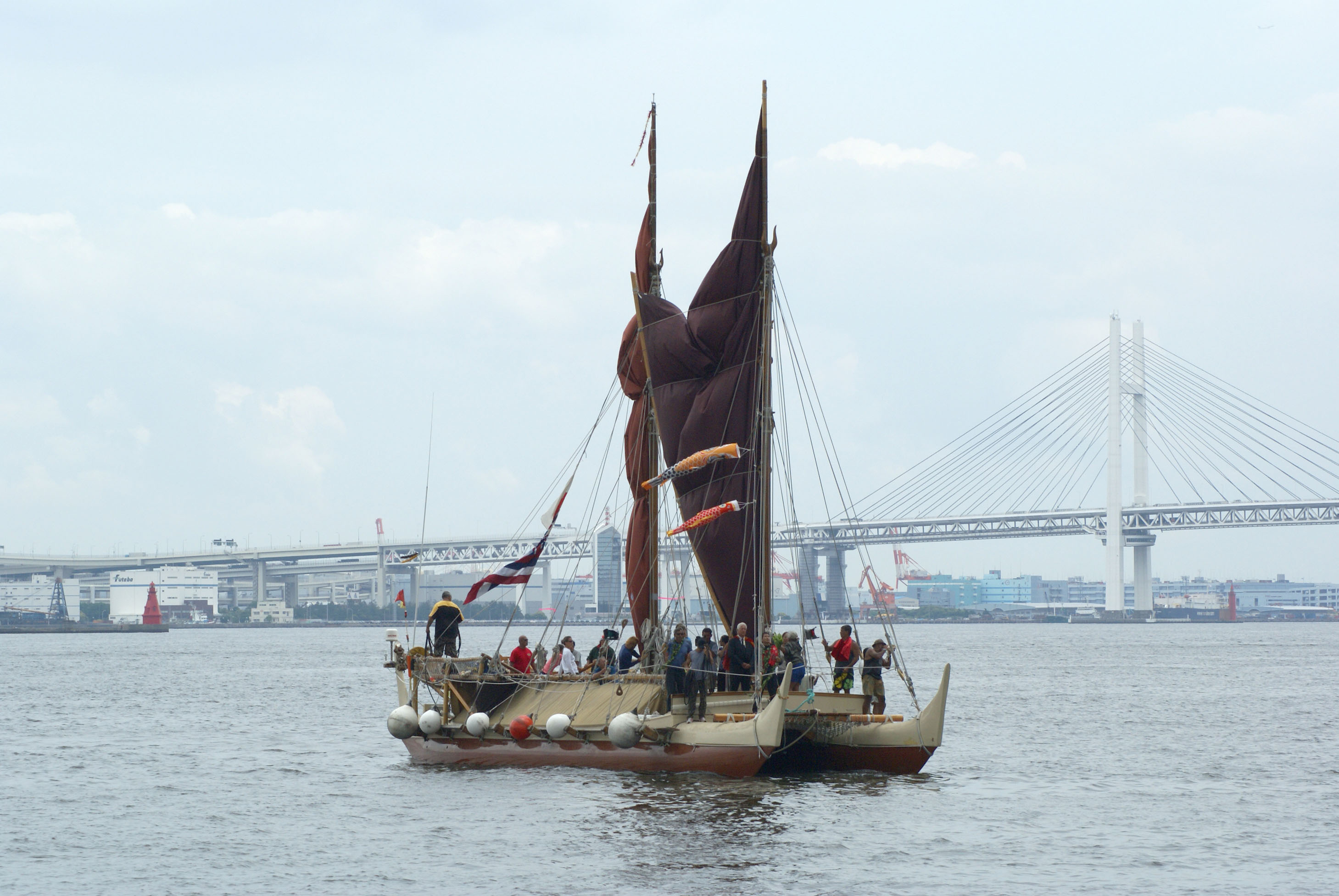
Hōkūle‘a arrives in Yokohama Bay, 2007; Yokohama Bay Bridge in background

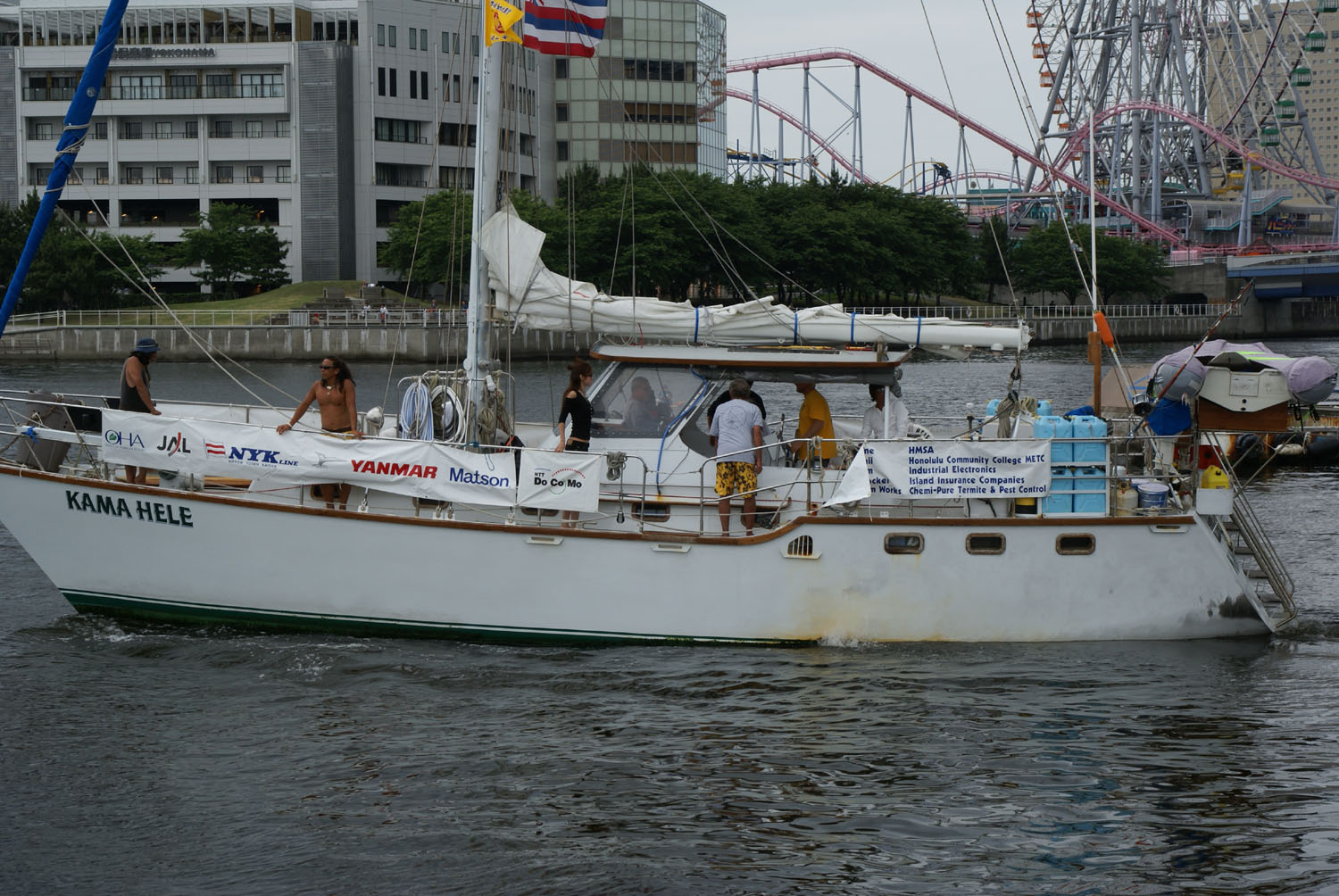
Escort boat Kama Hele at Port of Yokohama during the 2007 Micronesia-Japan voyage

== See also ==
- Hawaiʻiloa
- History of the Pacific Islands
- Pacific Islands
- Polynesian navigation
- Experimental archaeology
- Marumaru Atua

== Notes ==
=== General ===
* Shown at first mention of the crew person's name, denotes this person has died.

- For voyages across the International Date Line, dates shown below are standardized on Hawai‘i time.

== Sources ==
- Finney, Ben; Among, Marlene; et al. (1994). Voyage of Rediscovery: A Cultural Odyssey through Polynesia. Illustrations by Richard Rhodes. Berkeley, Los Angeles, London: University of California Press. ISBN 0-520-08002-5.
- Goodell, Lela (1989). "Polynesian Voyaging Society: Introduction" (PDF). A Guide to the Archives of the Polynesian Voyaging Society and Voyages of the Hōkūleʻa. The Kamehameha Schools. pp. 5, haw. Archived from the original (PDF) on 30 October 2008.
- Thompson, Nainoa (2006) [First published 1996]. "Reflections on Mau Piailug: Master Navigator, Master Teacher". Ku Holo Mau: 2007 Voyage to Micronesia for Mau Piailug. Polynesian Voyaging Society. Archived from the original on 15 May 2008. (Archived by WebCite)
- Kyselka, Will; Thompson, Nainoa. Lindo, Cecilia Kapua; Mower, Nancy Alpert (eds.). "Kealaikahiki: A New Look at Old Routes" (PDF). Polynesian Seafaring Heritage. Map by Ray Lanterman. The Kamehameha Schools and the Polynesian Voyaging Society.
