= Polynesian Voyaging Society =

Navigational society in Honolulu, Hawaii, United States

The Polynesian Voyaging Society (PVS) is a non-profit research and educational corporation based in Honolulu, Hawaiʻi. PVS was established to research and perpetuate traditional Polynesian voyaging methods. Using replicas of traditional double-hulled canoes, PVS undertakes voyages throughout Polynesia navigating without modern instruments.

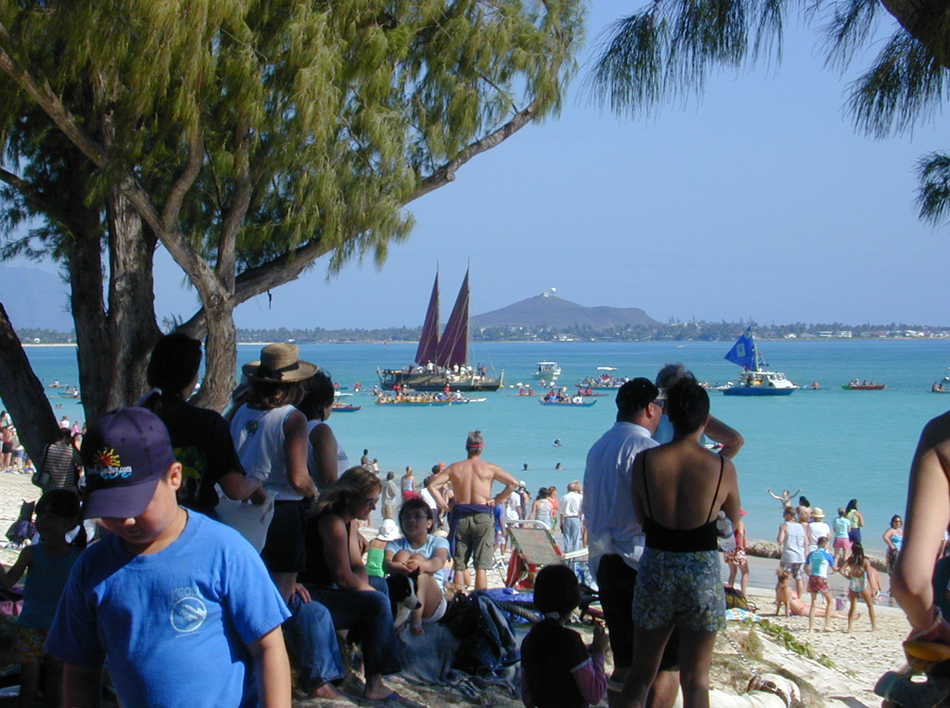
The Hawaiian voyaging canoe, Hokuleʻa, arrives off Kailua Beach on May 1, 2005.

== History ==
The society was founded in 1973 by nautical anthropologist Ben Finney, Hawaiian artist Herb Kawainui Kane, and sailor Charles Tommy Holmes. The three wanted to show that ancient Polynesians could have purposely settled the Polynesian Triangle using non-instrument navigation. The first PVS project was to build a replica of a double-hulled voyaging canoe.

In the genesis of the Society, the East–West Center was instrumental in convincing the UN authorities in the Pacific of the necessity of the project. The navigator Pius "Mau" Piailug, master of the techniques of traditional navigation, was named Special Fellow by the Center.

=== Hōkūleʻa ===
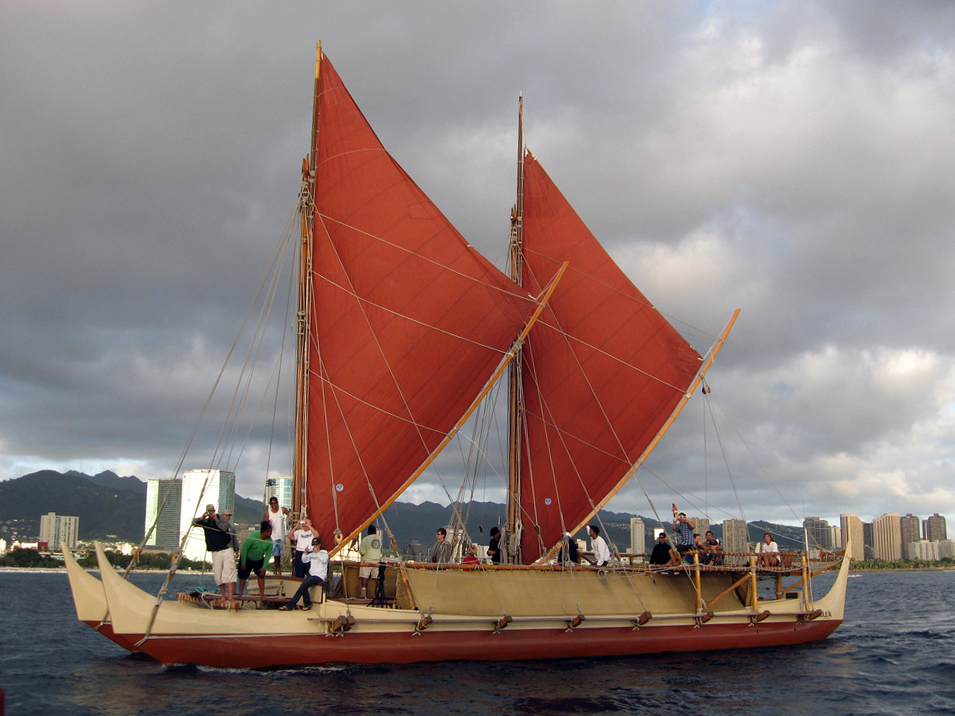
Hokuleʻa off the coast of Honolulu, January 2009

On March 8, 1975, the first voyaging canoe to be built in the Hawaiian Islands in over 600 years was launched with captain Kawika Kapahulehua and crew. Named the Hōkūleʻa, it left Hawaiʻi on May 1, 1976 for Tahiti in an attempt to retrace the ancient voyaging route. Micronesian navigator Mau Piailug, using no instruments, successfully navigated the canoe to Tahiti, arriving there on June 3, 1976.

After an attempted voyage to Tahiti in 1978 was aborted when the Hokuleʻa capsized near Lānaʻi and crew member Eddie Aikau was lost at sea, Piailug trained Nainoa Thompson in the ancient navigation methods. Two years later in 1980, Thompson replicated the successful 1976 voyage to Tahiti.

Since that voyage, the Hokuleʻa and her sister canoe the Hawaiʻiloa (built 1991–94) have undertaken voyages to other islands in Polynesia, including Samoa, Tonga, and New Zealand. More recently, in 2012 the Polynesian Voyaging Society built a further sister ship, the Hikianalia.

From 2014 to 2017, Nainoa Thompson and the Mālama Honua Worldwide Voyage engaged on a 3-year trip to visit 13 marine World Heritage Sites around the world. UNESCO and the Polynesian Voyaging Society had signed a partnership agreement to promote those historical sites through PVS' sailing adventures.

=== Makaliʻi ===
The Makali‘i was built on Hawaii (island). It was launched at Kawaihae on Saturday, February 4, 1995. Her maiden voyage was to Taputapuatea, Ra'iatea, in Tahiti Nui, and Nukuhiva in the Marquesas Islands in 1995, as part of Nā Ohana Holo Moana (The Voyaging Families of the Vast Ocean).

=== Alingano Maisu ===
On January 23, 2007 the Hokuleʻa and the Alingano Maisu set sail on a voyage to Micronesia and Japan. In March 2007, the canoes arrived at Piailug's home island of Satawal where five native Hawaiians and sixteen others were inducted into Pwo as master navigators. The event was the first Pwo ceremony on Satawal in 50 years and the Alingano Maisu was presented to Piailug as a gift for his contribution in reviving wayfinding navigation.

== Funding ==
The Times Online reported in March 2009 that the US Congress had earmarked $238,000 for the Polynesian Voyaging Society. The funding was targeted by John McCain as pork-barrel-funding.

== Recognition ==
- 2015: Nainoa Thompson is awarded the Asia Pacific Community Building Award by the East–West Center
