= Ben Finney =

American anthropologist

- Born: October 1, 1933; San Diego, California
- Died: May 23, 2017 (aged 83); Honolulu, Hawaii
- Occupations: Scientist, teacher, writer

Ben Rudolph Finney was an American anthropologist known for his expertise in the history and the social and cultural anthropology of surfing, Polynesian navigation, and canoe sailing, as well as in the cultural and social anthropology of human space colonization. As "surfing's premier historian and leading expert on Hawaiian surfing going back to the 17th century" and "the intellectual mentor, driving force, and international public face" of the Hokulea project, he played a key role in the Hawaiian Renaissance following his construction of the Hokulea precursor Nalehia in the 1960s and his co-founding of the Polynesian Voyaging Society in the 1970s.

== Biography ==
The son of a United States Navy pilot, Ben Finney was born in 1933 and grew up in San Diego, California. He earned his B.A. in history, economics, and anthropology at the University of California, Berkeley in 1955. In 1958, after serving in the U.S. Navy and working in the steel and aerospace industries, he went to Hawaii, where he earned his M.A. in anthropology at the University of Hawaiʻi in 1959. His master's degree thesis, "Hawaiian Surfing: a Study of Cultural Change", became the basis for Surfing: The Sport of Hawaiian Kings, a book that Finney co-authored with James D. Houston in 1966. Finney earned his Ph.D. in anthropology at Harvard University in 1964.

Finney held faculty appointments at the University of California, Santa Barbara, the Australian National University, the University of French Polynesia, and the International Space University. From 1970 through 2000 he was a professor of anthropology at the University of Hawaiʻi at Mānoa, where his courses included Human Adaptation to the Sea and Human Adaptation to Living in Space. From 1994 through 2003 he was the co-chair of the department of Space and Society at the International Space University.

In the 1990s, Finney was a National Research Council Associate with the SETI project at NASA Ames Research Center and involved in the Sandia National Laboratories planning and implementation of the Waste Isolation Pilot Plant for the disposal of nuclear waste. He was on the panel of experts for the 1998 PBS program Wayfinders: A Pacific Odyssey. During 2004-2006 he was a curator of the Vaka Moana canoe voyaging exhibit at the Auckland Museum in New Zealand. He was the featured guest speaker at the 2007 National Conference for Educational Robotics.

He later served as a professor at University of Hawaiʻi at Mānoa, and also as a distinguished research associate of the Bishop Museum. He and his wife, Mila, lived most of the year in Hawaii. Finney died on May 23, 2017, at the age of 83.

== Polynesian voyaging ==
Finney vividly remembers his advisor handing him a copy of Ancient Voyagers in the Pacific [published by the Polynesian Society in 1956], a book by New Zealander Andrew Sharp that suggested that Polynesian canoes were no good, that Polynesian navigation was lousy, and that the Pacific had been settled randomly, and accidentally. Finney, in Hawai‘i to do a master's of anthropology on surfing, took umbrage—inside. "I was already in trouble doing a master’s thesis on surfing, which was considered renegade and lower-class then," he explains. It was no time to hatch what professors might have considered wacky schemes, but silently Finney thought: Why not recreate a sailing canoe and prove Sharp wrong?

— Julia Steele, 'Among the Stars' article, Hana Hou!

When Ben Finney was a University of Hawaii graduate student in 1958, working toward his Master of Arts degree and writing his dissertation on surfing, scholars were not yet in agreement that any canoe voyages over great distances on the Pacific Ocean had been intentional. The prevailing view was exemplified by a New Zealand historian with a low opinion of Polynesian navigation methods and canoes, Andrew Sharp, who believed that such voyages could only have been accidental.

Finney did not agree with this view and became determined to disprove it. He built the first 40-feet-long replica of a Polynesian sailing canoe while he was teaching at University of California, Santa Barbara in the 1960s. When it was finished, he shipped it to Hawaii, where ancient Hawaii scholar Mary Kawena Pukui named it Nalehia, which in the Hawaiian language means The Skilled Ones, because of the grace with which its twin hulls rode the sea.

In 1973, Finney co-founded the Polynesian Voyaging Society with artist Herb Kawainui Kane and sailor Charles Tommy Holmes. Within three years, they had designed, built, and sailed the Hōkūleʻa on its first historic voyage from Hawaii to Tahiti with a crew led by captain Kawika Kapahulehua and navigator Mau Piailug.

== Awards ==
The awards that were bestowed upon Finney include:

- 1994: Royal Institute of Navigation Bronze Medal for the outstanding paper, "Rediscovering Polynesian Navigation through Experimental Voyaging" in the Journal of Navigation, Volume 46, 1993
- 1995: French University of the Pacific Medal for contributions to the revival of traditional voyaging and the study of Polynesian culture and society
- 1995: Tsiolkovsky State Museum of the History of Cosmonautics Tsiolkovsky Medal for contributions to the study of cosmonautics and the exploration of space
- 1997: University of Hawaiʻi Regents' Medal for Excellence in Research
- 2004: Hawaiʻi Book Publisher's Ka Palapala Po'okela Award for writing nonfiction
- 2007: Honorary Doctorate, University of French Polynesia

== Publications ==
(These are incomplete listings.)

=== Selected books ===
- 1966: Surfing: The Sport of Hawaiian Kings. With James D. Houston. Tokyo and Rutland: Charles E. Tuttle Company. ISBN 0-8048-0557-1.
  - 1996 30th anniversary edition: Surfing: A History of the Ancient Hawaiian Sport. Petaluma: Pomegranate Communications. ISBN 0-87654-594-0.
- 1976: Pacific Navigation and Voyaging. Auckland, New Zealand: The Polynesian Society. ISBN 0-8248-0584-4.
- 1979: Hokulea: The Way to Tahiti. New York: Dodd, Mead and Company. ISBN 0-396-07719-6.
- 1985: Interstellar Migration and the Human Experience. Ben R. Finney and Eric M. Jones, eds. Berkeley: University of California Press. ISBN 0-520-05898-4.
- 1992: From Sea to Space (The Macmillan Brown Lectures 1989). Palmerston North: Massey University. Distributed by the University of Hawaiʻi Press. ISBN 0-908665-59-8.
- 1994: Voyage of Rediscovery: A Cultural Odyssey through Polynesia. Berkeley: University of California Press. ISBN 0-520-08002-5.
- 2003: Sailing in the Wake of the Ancestors: Reviving Polynesian Voyaging. Honolulu: Bishop Museum Press. ISBN 1-58178-025-7.

=== Selected articles ===
- 1977: "Voyaging Canoes and the Settlement of Polynesia", Science, Volume 196, Number 4296: pages 1277–1285.
- 1981: "Exploring and Settling Pacific Ocean Space—Past Analogues for Future Events?" Space Manufacturing 4: Proceedings of the Fifth Princeton/AIAA Conference May 18–21, 1981 (page 261). New York: American Institute of Aeronautics and Astronautics.
- 1988: "Voyaging Against the Direction of the Trades: A Report of a Canoe Voyage from Samoa to Tahiti". American Anthropologist, Volume 90, Number 2: pages 401–405.
- 1991: "Myth, Experiment, and the Reinvention of Polynesian Voyaging." American Anthropologist, Volume 93, Number 2, June 1991, pages 383–404.
- 1994: "The Other One-Third of the Globe". Journal of World History, Volume 5, Number 2.
- 1994: "Polynesian Voyagers to the New World". Man and Culture in Oceania, Volume 10: pages 1–13.
- 1995: "A role for Magnetoreception in Human Navigation". Current Anthropology, Volume 36, Number 3: pages 500–506.
- 2001: "Voyage to Polynesia's Land's End". Antiquity, Volume 75: pages 172–181.
- 2007: "Tracking Polynesian Seafarers". Science, Volume 317: pages 1873–1874.

=== Selected chapters in other books ===
- 1985: "Lunar Base: Learning to live in space" (pages 731–756) in Wendell Mendell, ed., Lunar Bases and Space Activities of the 21st Century. Houston: Lunar and Planetary Institute. ISBN 0-89464-011-9.
- 1988: "Will space change humanity?" (pages 155–172) in J. Schneider and M. Leger-Orine, eds., Frontiers and Space Conquest: The Philosopher's Touchstone. Bingham: Kluwer Academic Press. ISBN 90-277-2741-4.
- 1996: "Colonizing an Island World" (pages 71–116) in Ward H. Goodenough, ed., Prehistoric Settlement of the Pacific. Philadelphia: Diane Publishing Co. ISBN 0-87169-865-X
- 2007: Three chapters in Vaka Moana, Voyages of the Ancestors: The Discovery and Settlement of the Pacific. Kerry Howe (Massey University School of Social and Cultural Studies), ed. Honolulu: University of Hawaiʻi Press. ISBN 978-0-8248-3213-1.
- 2007: "Polynesia, Micronesia and Eastern Melanesia: the Exploration and Settlement of Remote Oceania". In The Oxford Encyclopedia of Maritime History, Volume 3, pages 154–162. Oxford: Oxford University Press.

== In popular culture ==
A character in Launch Out, a Philip Robert Harris science fiction novel that is set in the year 2010, is based on Finney, a University of Hawaiʻi professor of anthropology who is also the president of the fictional Unispace Academy.
