= Alingano Maisu =

Polynesian double-hulled voyaging canoe

Alingano Maisu, also known as Maisu /ˈmaɪʃuː/, is a double-hulled voyaging canoe built in Kawaihae, Hawaii, by members of Na Kalai Waʻa Moku o Hawaiʻi and ʻOhana Wa'a members from throughout the Pacific and abroad as a gift and tribute to Satawalese navigator Mau Piailug, who navigated the voyaging canoe Hōkūleʻa on her maiden voyage to Tahiti in 1976 and has since trained numerous native Hawaiians in the ancient art of wayfinding. The word maisu comes from the Satawalese word for breadfruit that has been knocked down by storm winds and is therefore available for anyone to take. The name is said to symbolize the knowledge of navigation that is made freely available.

The concept for Alingano Maisu came about in 2001 when two Hawaiian voyaging groups, the Polynesian Voyaging Society and Na Kalai Waʻa Moku o Hawaiʻi, met with Piailug. The two hulls of the 56-foot (17 m) vessel were fabricated by the Friends of Hōkūleʻa and Hawaiʻiloa on Oʻahu and shipped to the Island of Hawaiʻi where Na Kalai Waʻa completed construction of the canoe. The Polynesian Voyaging Society provided much of the funding for the voyaging aspect of the project as well as an escort boat to help sail the canoe to Satawal.

The canoe is home-ported on the island of Yap under the command of Piailug's son, Sesario Sewralur.

== Maiden voyage ==
Accompanied by Hōkūleʻa, the Maisu left Kawaihae, Hawaii, on January 18, 2007. After stops in the Marshall Islands, Pohnpei, and Chuuk, the Maisu reached Satawal on March 15, 2007. On March 18, while on Satawal, five native Hawaiian navigators on the voyage were inducted into pwo, a sacred Micronesian brotherhood of master navigators.

Hōkūleʻa and Maisu both left Satawal on March 20 and made stops in Woleai, Ulithi and Yap before reaching Palau. The Maisu then returned to Yap, while the Hōkūleʻa continued on to Japan.

== Navigation Training Program with Palau Community College ==
In June 2008, Palau Community College announced that there will be a one-year program in traditional non-instrumental navigation on the Alingano Maisu under Sesario Sewralur.

== See also ==
- Hokuleʻa
- Polynesian Voyaging Society
