= Hector Busby =

New Zealand canoe builer and navigator (1932–2019)

Palu Sir Hector Busby KNZM MBE
- Tā Heke-nuku-mai-nga-iwi Puhipi
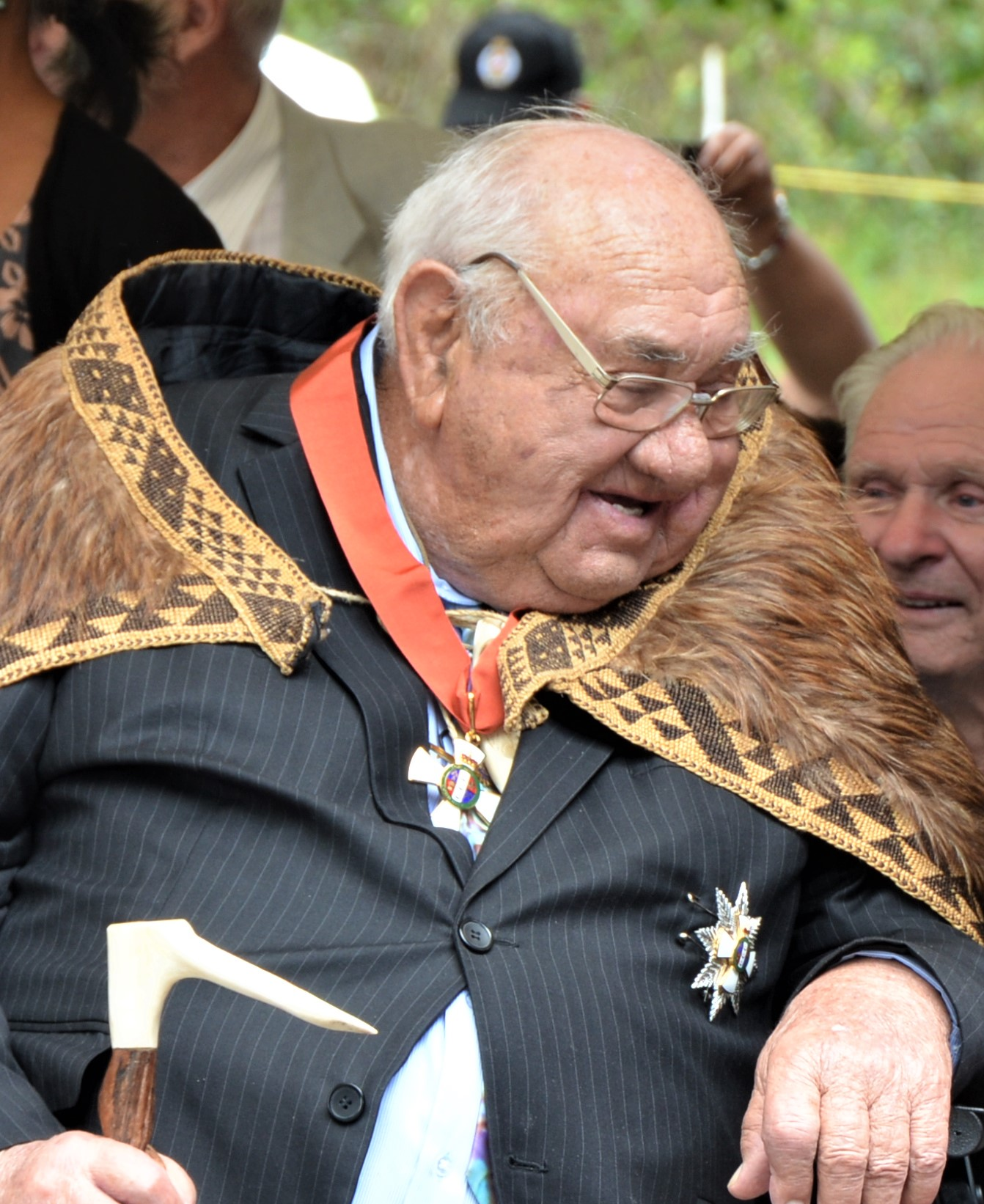
- Busby in February 2019
- Born: 1 August 1932; Pukepoto
- Died: 11 May 2019 (aged 86)
- Other name: Hec or Hek

Sir Hector Busby KNZM MBE (1 August 1932 – 11 May 2019), also known as Heke-nuku-mai-nga-iwi Puhipi and Hec Busby, was a New Zealand Māori navigator and traditional waka builder. He was recognised as a leading figure in the revival of traditional Polynesian navigation and ocean voyaging using wayfinding techniques.

He built 26 traditional waka, including the double-hulled Te Aurere in 1991. Te Aurere has sailed over 30,000 nautical miles in the Pacific Ocean, including Hawaii, Cook Islands, French Polynesia, New Caledonia and Norfolk Island. In December 2012, Te Aurere and Ngahiraka Mai Tawhiti (another waka built by Busby) reached Rapa Nui after a 5000-nautical-mile, four-month voyage from New Zealand. The two waka then made the return journey to New Zealand, landing at Aurere Beach in Doubtless Bay in May 2013.

== Honours ==
Busby received the New Zealand Commemoration Medal in 1990. In the 1994 Queen's Birthday Honours, he was appointed a Member of the Order of the British Empire, for services to the Māori people. In the 2014 New Year Honours, Busby was named an Officer of the New Zealand Order of Merit, for services to Māori. He was promoted to Knight Companion, for services to Māori, in the 2018 Queen's Birthday Honours.

== Personal life ==
Busby was of mixed Pākehā and Māori heritage. He affiliated to the Māori iwi (tribes) of Te Rarawa and Ngāti Kahu.

Busby died on 11 May 2019.

== See also ==
- Hōkūleʻa
- Nainoa Thompson
