= Satawal =

Atoll in Yap State, Federated States of Micronesia

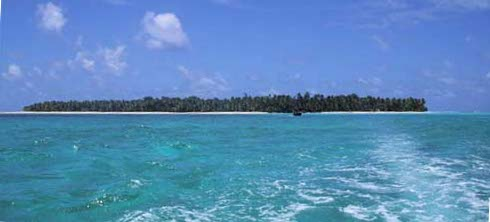
- Satawal Atoll

- Location of Satawal in Yap State, Federated States of Micronesia

Geography
- Location: North Pacific
- Coordinates: 7.3579°N 147.0373°E
- Archipelago: Caroline
- Total islands: 1
- Area: 1.3 km^{2} (0.50 sq mi)
- Highest elevation: 2 m (7 ft)

Administration
- Federated States of Micronesia
- State: Yap

Demographics
- Demonym: Satawalese
- Population: 500 (2000)
- Ethnic groups: Micronesian

Satawal is a solitary coral atoll of one island with about 500 people on just over 1 km^{2} (0.39 sq mile) located in the Caroline Islands in the Pacific Ocean. It forms a legislative district in Yap State in the Federated States of Micronesia. Satawal is the easternmost island in the Yap island group and is located approximately 70 kilometers (43 mi) east of Lamotrek.

== Name ==
The name of the island goes back to Proto-Chuukic *tadawana, making it etymologically related to Satawan.

== Geography ==
The island, which measures 2 kilometers (1.2 mi) long northeast-southwest, is up to 0.8 kilometers (0.50 mi) wide and sits atop a small platform-like reef with a narrow fringing reef. The total land area is 1.3 square kilometers (0.50 sq mi), and is thickly wooded with coconut and breadfruit trees. As there are no anchorages for large boats, Satawal is seldom visited by outsiders. Administratively Piagailoe Atoll, located 71 kilometers to the northwest, belongs to Satawal municipality.

== Culture ==
The native language is Satawalese, a Chuukic language closely related to Woleaian, and the entire population of the island numbers approximately 500. Although located in Yap State, the people of Satawal are more closely related, culturally and linguistically, to those of Chuuk.

The Satawalese primarily subsist on fishing and some agriculture (coconuts, breadfruit, taro). They build small thatch houses for sleeping and use the trunks of breadfruit trees for boat-building. Cultural forms primarily revolve around dance and story-telling, and an alcoholic beverage known as tuba (a palm wine) is brewed from fermented sap of the coconut flower spike.

== History ==
In 1849 an earthquake struck which caused flooding. This flood led to the island being submerged with the exception of trees people climbed onto. The island was submerged for several hours. People in certain cases who were hanging on the trees were carried off by the water and drowned. Eight survivors from the island came to the Marianas in April of 1849 to permanently live there. There were survivors who were still on the island but could not leave for lack of boats. They also planned on leaving the island permanently.

As with all of the Caroline Islands, sovereignty passed from Spain to the Empire of Germany in 1899. The island came under the control of the Empire of Japan after World War I, and was subsequently administered under the South Seas Mandate. Following World War II, the island came under the control of the United States of America and was administered as part of the Trust Territory of the Pacific Islands from 1947, and became part of the Federated States of Micronesia from 1979.

On March 18, 1994, the freighter Oceanus ventured out of the main shipping channel when its captain attempted to peek at topless Satawalese women. The freighter ran aground on the nearby Wenimong coral reef, the primary source of food for the islanders, and 13,000 square meters of the reef were ravaged. The freighter's insurer, the North of England P&I Association, ended up paying US$2 million in compensation to the Satawalese.

== Expert navigators ==
The island is best known for its preservation of traditional navigational techniques without the use of instruments, based on indigenous astronomical and maritime concepts. Despite its small population, Satawal has continued to produce ocean-going canoes and expert navigators versed in these traditions. The best-known of the Satawal master navigators (paliuw), Mau Piailug, served as mentor and teacher to the founding members of the Polynesian Voyaging Society. The daily life of Satawal is documented in the Steve Thomas book The Last Navigator, which also treats Mau Piailug's traditional navigation system in some depth. Sanford J. Low produced The Navigators: Pathfinders of the Pacific, a documentary film about Mau Piailug and communal life on Satawal including food preparation, fishing and boat building. Mau Piailug led a successful experimental expedition from Maui to Tahiti in a replica voyaging canoe in 1976.

On March 18, 2007, Piailug presided over the first Pwo ceremony for navigators on Satawal in 56 years. At the event five native Hawaiians and eleven others were inducted into Pwo as master navigators. The Polynesian Voyaging Society presented Piailug a canoe, the Alingano Maisu, as a gift for his key role in reviving traditional wayfinding navigation in Hawaii.
