= Steering oar =

Single oar used to direct a watercraft

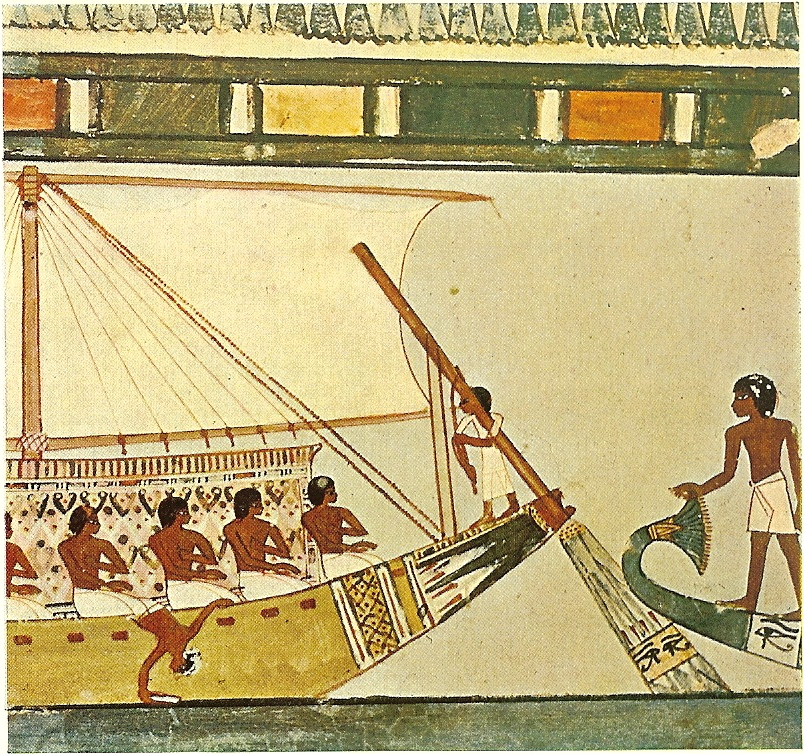
Stern-mounted steering oar of an Egyptian riverboat

The steering oar or steering board is an over-sized oar or board, to control the direction of a ship or other watercraft prior to the invention of the rudder.

It is normally attached to the starboard side in larger vessels, though in smaller ones it is rarely, if ever, attached. The steering oar was crucial in the invention of larger vessels in a time when the technology for rudders did not exist. Steering oars were the typical steering mechanism on larger Viking ships.
