= ʻAulani Wilhelm =

Native Hawaiian ocean conservationist

'Aulani Wilhelm
- Born: Hawai'i
- Education: Stanford Graduate School of Business, University of Southern California
- Occupation: CEO
- Organization: Nia Tero
- Known for: Indigenous Peoples' guardianship
- Board member of: San Diego Zoo Wildlife Alliance
- Honours: Time100 Climate List, Mellon Distinguished Scholar at Arizona State University’s Center for Imagination at the Borderlands, Stanford Social Innovation Fellow

ʻAulani Wilhelm is a Native Hawaiian (Hawaiian: Kanaka ʻŌiwi) activist. She focuses on collaboration with Native Hawaiian communities to drive innovations in ocean policy and conservation.

Wilhelm leads Nia Tero, a Seattle-based nonprofit that supports Indigenous peoples’ guardianship of ecosystems. Since becoming the organization’s first Indigenous CEOm she has grown the nonprofit to become one of the largest supporters of Indigenous groups; in 2025, Nia Tero hit a milestone of awarding more than $100 million in grants since its inception in 2017. The group has supported 274 Indigenous peoples across more than 300 million acres of critical ecosystems.

She took the lead in designing and establishing the first-ever US marine national monument, the Papahānaumokuākea Marine National Monument and World Heritage Site in the Hawaiian Islands.

== Career ==
In 2023, Wilhelm joined Nia Tero, a nonprofit working to directly support Indigenous Peoples’ guardianship and elevate the role and influence of Indigenous Peoples as essential to ensuring planetary health and habitability. After joining as their Chief Strategy & External Relations Officer, the Nia Tero Board of Directors unanimously supported the appointment of ‘Aulani as their next CEO, beginning January 1, 2025, following an international executive succession process.

Wilhelm previously served as the Assistant Director for Ocean Conservation, Climate and Equity at the White House Office of Science and Technology Policy (OSTP). During her tenure the OSTP published the historic "Guidance for Federal Departments and Agencies on Indigenous Knowledge." The Guidance recognizes Indigenous Knowledge, or Traditional Ecological Knowledge, as "a valid form of evidence" and recognizes that many different ways of knowing strengthen decision making. Therefore, it calls on federal agencies to incorporate Indigenous Knowledge, as appropriate, in setting their policies.

Wilhelm co-chaired the Ocean Justice Strategy Workgroup of the White House Office of Science and Technology Policy. The group authored the "Ocean Justice Strategy," which builds ocean justice on environmental justice. It calls for equitable access to the benefits of oceans, engaging with Indigenous peoples in making decisions about oceans, and improving ocean education.

She also worked as Senior Vice President for Oceans at Conservation International, where she co-led the Blue Nature Alliance, a global partnership to catalyze the conservation of 18 million km2 of ocean.

Wilhelm is also the founder of Big Ocean, a network of the world’s largest marine managed areas. Prior, she was director of ocean initiatives for NOAA’s Office of Marine Sanctuaries.

‘Aulani is a Mellon Distinguished Scholar at Arizona State University’s Center for Imagination at the Borderlands. She holds an MS degree from Stanford University and a BA degree from the University of Southern California. At Stanford she was appointed the 2014 Social Innovation Fellow.

=== Papahānaumokuākea Marine National Monument ===
Wilhelm has played a pivotal role in shaping the emerging field of large-scale ocean conservation, leading the establishment of the Papahānaumokuākea Marine National Monument and World Heritage Site. As the first superintendent, she implemented a management policy that integrated Native Hawaiian cultural knowledge, traditions, and practices with Western science.

The design of the Papahānaumokuākea Marine National Monument integrates Native Hawaiian cultural history and ceremony into its design. This is distinct from the usual philosophy of national parks, in which humans are seen as separate from nature and parks are created in order to limit human activities within them.

On his 99th birthday, David Attenborough released Ocean, which includes a segment narrated by 'Aulani Wilhelm.

== Philosophical views ==
‘Aulani is committed to ocean conservation that honors Indigenous guardianship of lands and waters and that preserves and incorporates Native cultural heritages.

Wilhelm spoke about the role that Indigenous communities play in protecting ocean ecosystems at the United Nations Ocean Conference in June. “Protection is not a single act,” she said. “It occurs over time and is driven by people and communities who care, who name places and maintain intergenerational relationships with them.”

On hope: "Lots of people talk about hope as if it will enable solutions and without it, we are doomed. But I don’t think about hope that way. Hope helps me get up in the morning and fight another day but hope alone is not enough. If we merely use hope to distract us while we wait for someone to deliver solutions, then we—and that hope—are part of the problem."

On Indigenous Peoples' Guardianship: "To change course, we must invest in the oldest, best-proven strategy to protect the natural world: Indigenous Peoples’ Guardianship. Roughly half of the world’s healthiest ecosystems are in the hands of Indigenous Peoples who live in close relationship to their lands and waters. This can expand with sufficient funding and policy changes that match the potential of Indigenous Peoples’ Guardianship. Together, government and civil society can unlock the potential of Indigenous Peoples’ Guardianship to do more than slow the loss of the natural world. We can reverse it before it’s too late."

== Awards and recognition ==
Wilhelm was named on the Time100 Climate list, recognizing the most innovative leaders driving business climate action. In her feature she reflects, "Simply put, we all need to stand behind the oldest, best proven protectors of the natural world: Indigenous guardians. As the world warms and climate impacts spread across the planet, the places that defy the odds are those where Indigenous Peoples still have the agency and means to protect their homelands. This is not by chance—it is because these lands and waters are in the hands of communities who know and embrace their responsibility to care for nature."

== Publications (selected) ==
- Bennett, N. J., Wilhelm, ʻAulani, et al. (2021). Advancing Social Equity in and through Marine Conservation. Frontiers in Marine Science, 8. https://doi.org/10.3389/fmars.2021.711538
- Kikiloi, K., Friedlander, A. M., Wilhelm, ʻAulani, Lewis, N., Quiocho, K., ʻĀila, W., & Kahoʻohalahala, S. (2017). Papahānaumokuākea: Integrating Culture in the Design and Management of one of the World's Largest Marine Protected Areas. Coastal Management, 45(6), 436–451. https://doi.org/10.1080/08920753.2017.1373450
- Wilhelm, T. ʻAulani, Charles R. C. Sheppard, Anne L. S. Sheppard, Carlos F. Gaymer, John Parks, Daniel Wagner, Naiʻa Lewis (2014). Large Marine Protected Areas – Advantages and Challenges of Going Big. Aquatic Conservation: Marine and Freshwater Ecosystems, 24(S2), 24–30. https://doi.org/10.1002/aqc.2499
