= Pwo =

Micronesian initiation ritual

Pwo is a sacred initiation ritual, in which students of traditional navigation in the Caroline Islands in Micronesia become navigators (palu) and are initiated in the associated secrets. Many islanders in the area indicate that this ceremony originated on the island of Pollap, or nearby islands.

The Pwo ceremony today is having a comeback in importance. In the days before World War II, it was common to have Pwo take place. After WWII, through westernization and the influence of missionaries traditional practices including Pwo started to be abandoned. Mau Piailug, famous for helping Hawaiians regain their traditional navigation skills, was the last person to go through the Pwo ceremony in 1951. For thirty-nine years, the ceremony lay dormant. Then, in May 1990, Pwo again took place. This time Jesus Urupiy, a master navigator, with help of an American ethnographer and documentary filmmaker, Eric Metzgar, conducted the Pwo for his son, Ali Haleyalur, and four other students on the island of Lamotrek. This event was subsequently made into the film Spirits of the Voyage.

On March 18, 2007, Piailug presided over the first Pwo ceremony for navigators on the island of Satawal in 56 years. At the event five native Hawaiians and eleven others were inducted into Pwo as master navigators. The Polynesian Voyaging Society presented Piailug a double-hulled canoe, the Alingano Maisu, as a gift for his key role in reviving traditional wayfinding navigation in Hawaii.

Then in March 2008, Piailug presided the Pwo ceremony for the Māori navigator Hekenukumai Nga Iwi Busby.

== Quotations ==
“During the term of [Pwo] instruction the pupils are subject to a series of taboos ... These taboos are strictest for the first four days and nights; then the students may not leave the canoe house under any circumstances.” Hans Damn (based on the 1909 field notes of Ernst Sarfert's research on Polowat); “Inseln um Truk: Polowat, Hok, und Satawal.” IN: Georg Thilenius (Ed.) Ergebnisse der Südsee-Expedition 1908-1910. Sec. II, B, Vol. 6, Pt. 2, 1935.

“First of all, ppwo is the esoteric art of navigation ... Secondly, those who are adept at the esoteric art of navigation are also called ppwo. Thirdly, initiating others in this esoteric art of navigation is also known as ppwo ... Three of the islanders, Punakit, Yaapuk and Urupiy are to be initiated this time in the art of the ppwo by Suuta ... of Puluwat and today there is to be a ceremony for this.” Hisakatsu, Hijikata (1997) [1942], Collective Works of Hijikata Hisakatsu. Vol. 4, "Driftwood: The Life in Satawal Island, Micronesia." Journal entry for June 3, 1932. Kenichi Sudo (Ed.), Translated by Yoko Fujita, Ronald R. Ringdahl, Satoshi Tanahashi, and Sandra Tanahashi. Tokyo: The Sasakawa Peace Foundation.

“Ppwo ... to be initiated as a navigator.” Elbert, Samuel (1972), Puluwat Dictionary. Pacific Linguistics, Series C - No. 24, S.A. Wurm (Ed.), Department of Linguistics, School of Pacific Studies, the Australian National University, Canberra: Australia.

“Periodically, when enough responsible candidates have reached the required standard, the whole community is mobilized and an initiation poa is organized.” Lewis, David H. (1978), The Voyaging Stars: Secrets of the Pacific Island Navigators. New York: W.W. Norton & Company, Inc.

“Ppo is held for young men who have received private teaching for an average of seven to eight years. The main part of this ritual consists of examining the young man’s knowledge of navigation techniques, and further instruction by the older considered to be the most skillful navigator on the island.” Sudo, Ken-ichi (1987), “Nurturing in Matrilineal Society: A Case Study of Satawal Island.” IN: Iwao Ushijima and Ken-ichi Sudo (Eds.) Cultural Uniformity and Diversity in Micronesia. Senri Ethnological Studies No. 21, Osaka: National Museum of Ethnology.

“Pwpwo ... instruction in traditional navigation.” Goodenough, Ward and Hiroshi Sugita (1980), Trukese-English Dictionary. Philadelphia: American Philosophical Society.

"...the sacred pwo ceremony. The most important event in a young navigator's life, it not only marked his passage into manhood, but also gained him entrance to a select and privileged class and gave him the right to learn secret, mystical, navigational lore. Piailug's had been the last pwo ceremony to be held on Satawal." Thomas, Stephen D. (1987), The Last Navigator. New York: Henry Holt and Co.

"...the notion of performing the pwo rites gradually gained acceptance and in May 1990, for the first time in over forty years, a few individuals who had been studying and practicing traditional navigational techniques for many years were 'graduated' on Lamotrek and officially recognized by the community-at-large." Metzgar, Eric (1991), Traditional Education in Micronesia: A Case Study of Lamotrek Atoll with Comparative Analysis of the Literature on the Trukic Continuum." Ph.D. dissertation. University of California, Los Angeles. Ann Arbor, Michigan: University Microfilms International.

"...the pwo ceremony is first and foremost an initiation ritual, and secondarily a 'graduation' or 'certification' ritual for those students who have received training in navigational techniques over a period of years." Metzgar, Eric (1991), Traditional Education in Micronesia: A Case Study of Lamotrek Atoll with Comparative Analysis of the Literature on the Trukic Continuum." Ph.D. dissertation. University of California, Los Angeles. Ann Arbor, Michigan: University Microfilms International.

"...the name for the island, Pwollap, supposedly means the center, or origin, of navigation: ppwo means "to be initiated as a navigator" and lap means "big" or "important." This belief is a source of considerable pride for the island, and Pulapese derive self-esteem from knowing that Puluwat and other islanders acknowledge that navigation originated on Pulap." Flinn, Juliana (1992), Diplomas and Thatch Houses: Asserting Tradition in a Changing Micronesia. Ann Arbor: University of Michigan Press.

"The last pwo ceremony had been performed on Satawal about forty years earlier, between 1950-1952. Since then this navigator rite of passage had come closer and closer to extinction with the demise of master navigators qualified to transmit the restricted navigational knowledge and chants which, by ancient custom, were only to be taught after apprentices were initiated in the pwo ceremony." Metzgar, Eric (2004) "Sacred Space, Taboo Place: Negotiating Roang on Lamotrek Atoll." Micronesian Journal of the Humanities and Social Sciences. Vol. 3 (1-2), pp. 3–18.
