= Kawika Kapahulehua =

Hawaiian sailor

Elia Kawika David Kuʻualoha Kapahulehua (July 13, 1930 – May 17, 2007) was a Hawaiian sailor who was the first to captain an ocean-voyaging canoe from Hawaii to Tahiti in modern times.

== Background ==
Kapahulehua was born on Niʻihau, in 1930 and picked up the name "Kawika" as a young adult crewing catamarans on Waikiki Beach.

== Major accomplishments ==
The famed 1976 voyage of the Hōkūleʻa was beset with problems, but ultimately successful. The goal was to see if a 62-foot-long (19 m), two-masted canoe that approximated ancient canoes could be sailed without navigational equipment on the 2,250-nautical-mile (4,170 km) journey. While navigator Mau Piailug guided the ship, Kapahulehua had to deal with 6 of 17 crew members who quit their duties at sea.

A 1978 attempt in which he did not participate capsized after six hours and led to the death of surfer Eddie Aikau.

== Later life ==
In later life, he taught the Hawaiian language, wrote vocabulary books, and officiated at traditional Hawaiian rites. Kapahulehua died in Honolulu, Hawaii.
