= Micronesian navigation =

Methods to navigate the Pacific ocean

The Austronesian peoples, who include the people of Micronesia, developed oceangoing sailing technologies to migrate across the Pacific Ocean.

Micronesian navigation techniques are those navigation skills used for thousands of years by the navigators who voyaged between the thousands of small islands in the western Pacific Ocean in the subregion of Oceania, that is commonly known as Micronesia. These voyagers used wayfinding techniques such as the navigation by the stars, and observations of birds, ocean swells, and wind patterns, and relied on a large body of knowledge from oral tradition. These navigation techniques continued to be held by Polynesian navigators and navigators from the Santa Cruz Islands. The re-creations of Polynesian voyaging in the late 20th century used traditional stellar navigational methods that had remained in everyday use in the Caroline Islands.

== Early voyaging ==
Based on the current scientific consensus, the Micronesians are considered, by linguistic, archaeological, and human genetic evidence, to be a subset of the sea-migrating Austronesian people, who include the Polynesian people and the Melanesian people. Austronesians were the first people to invent oceangoing sailing technologies (notably double-hulled sailing canoes, outrigger boats, lashed-lug boat building, and the crab claw sail), which enabled their rapid dispersal into the islands of the Indo-Pacific. From 2000 BCE they assimilated (or were assimilated by) the earlier populations on the islands in their migration pathway.

The Mariana Islands were first settled around 1500 to 1400 BCE by migrants departing from the Philippines. This was followed by a second migration from the Caroline Islands during the first millennium CE, and a third migration from Island Southeast Asia (likely the Philippines or eastern Indonesia) by 900 CE.

People from the Caroline Islands had regular contact with the Chamorro people of the Marianas Islands, as well as rarer voyages into the eastern islands of the Philippines.

== 20th Century navigators ==
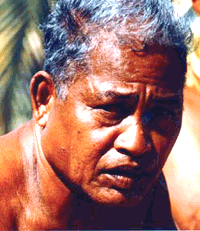
Navigator Mau Piailug (1932–2010) of Satawal island

Mau Piailug was the best-known teacher of traditional, non-instrument wayfinding methods for open-ocean voyaging. He was a master navigator from the Carolinian island of Satawal. He earned the title of master navigator (palu) by the age of eighteen in 1950; which involved the sacred initiation ritual known as Pwo. As he neared middle age, he grew concerned that the practice of navigation in Satawal would disappear as his people became acculturated to Western values. In the hope that the navigational tradition would be preserved for future generations, Mau shared his knowledge with the Polynesian Voyaging Society (PVS). With Mau's help, PVS recreated and tested lost Hawaiian navigational techniques on the Hōkūle‘a, a modern reconstruction of a double-hulled Hawaiian voyaging canoe.

Hipour was a master navigator from the navigational school of Weriyeng and the island of Puluwat. In 1969, Hipour accompanied David Henry Lewis on his ketch Isbjorn from Puluwat in Chuuk to Saipan in the Northern Mariana Islands, and back, using traditional navigation techniques; a distance of approximately 1,000 km (621.37 mi) each way.

In April 1970, Repunglug and Repunglap, half-brothers, navigated from Satawal to Saipan in a traditional Carolinian outrigger canoe, which was approximately 26 feet (7.92 m) long, and equipped with a canvas sail. This voyage was understood on Satawal to be the first time in the 20th century that a traditional canoe had made the voyage to Saipan. While they used a small boat compass, they relied on their knowledge of traditional stellar navigation and wave patterns to sail approximately 52 miles (84 km) to West Fayu, where they waited for favourable winds before continuing on the 422 miles (679 km) voyage to Saipan. They later made the return journey to Satawal.

In the early 1970's there were at least 17 men who could serve as a master navigator (palu) for voyages to the Marianas. They include Sautan on Elato; Orupi, a Satawal man residing on Lamotrek; Ikegun, Epaimai, Repunglug, Repunglap, and Mau Piailug from Satawal; Ikuliman, Ikefie, Manipi, Rapwi, Faipiy, Faluta, Filewa and Hipour, all from Puluwat; Yaitiluk from Pulap, and Amanto from Tamatam. There were also six or seven apprentice navigators learning the art of traditional navigation on Satawal, including Epoumai and Repunglug's son Olakiman.

== Navigational techniques ==
The Carolinian navigation system, used by Mau Piailug, relies on navigational clues using the Sun and stars, winds and clouds, seas and swells, observing the flight path of birds, and the patterns of bioluminescence that indicated the direction in which islands were located, which skills were acquired through rote learning passed down through teachings in the oral tradition.

Once they had arrived fairly close to a destination island, the navigator would have been able to pinpoint its location by sightings of land-based birds, the cloud formations that form over islands, as well as the reflections of shallow water made on the undersides of clouds. Subtle differences in the colour of the sky also could be recognised as resulting from the presence of lagoons or shallow waters, as deep water was a poor reflector of light while the lighter colour of the water of lagoons and shallow waters could be identified in the reflection in the sky.

These wayfinding navigation technique relies heavily on constant observation and memorization. Navigators have to memorize where they have sailed from in order to know where they are. The sun was the main guide for navigators because they could follow its exact points as it rose and set. Once the sun had set they would use the rising and setting points of the stars. When there were no stars because of a cloudy night or during daylight, a navigator would use the winds and swells as guides.

=== Navigation by the stars ===
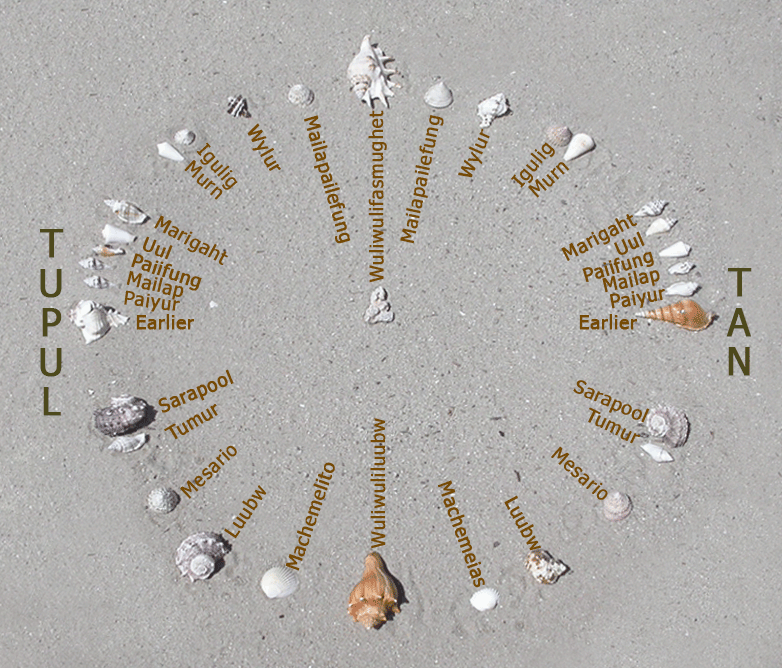
Star compass of Mau Piailug taught in the Caroline Islands, with North at top. Re-creation with shells on sand, with Satawalese (Chuukic) text labels, from the Polynesian Voyaging Society. See annotations on Commons.

The positions of the stars helped guide voyages. Stars, as opposed to planets, hold fixed celestial positions year-round, changing only their rising time with the seasons. Each star has a specific declination, and can give a bearing for navigation as it rises or sets.

For navigators near the equator, (as navigators sailing between the islands of Micronesia), celestial navigation is simplified, given that the whole celestial sphere is exposed. Any star that passes through the zenith (overhead) moves along the celestial equator, the basis of the equatorial coordinate system. Voyagers would set a heading by a star near the horizon, switching to a new one once the first rose too high. A specific sequence of stars would be memorized for each route.

Navigating by the stars requires knowledge of when particular stars, as they rotated through the night sky, would pass over the island to which the voyagers were sailing. The technique of "sailing down the latitude" was used. That is, knowledge that the movement of stars over different islands followed a similar pattern, (by recognising that different islands have a similar relationship to the night sky) provided the navigators with a sense of latitude, so that they could sail with the prevailing wind, before turning east or west to reach the island that was their destination.

=== Recording wave and swell formation in navigational devices ===
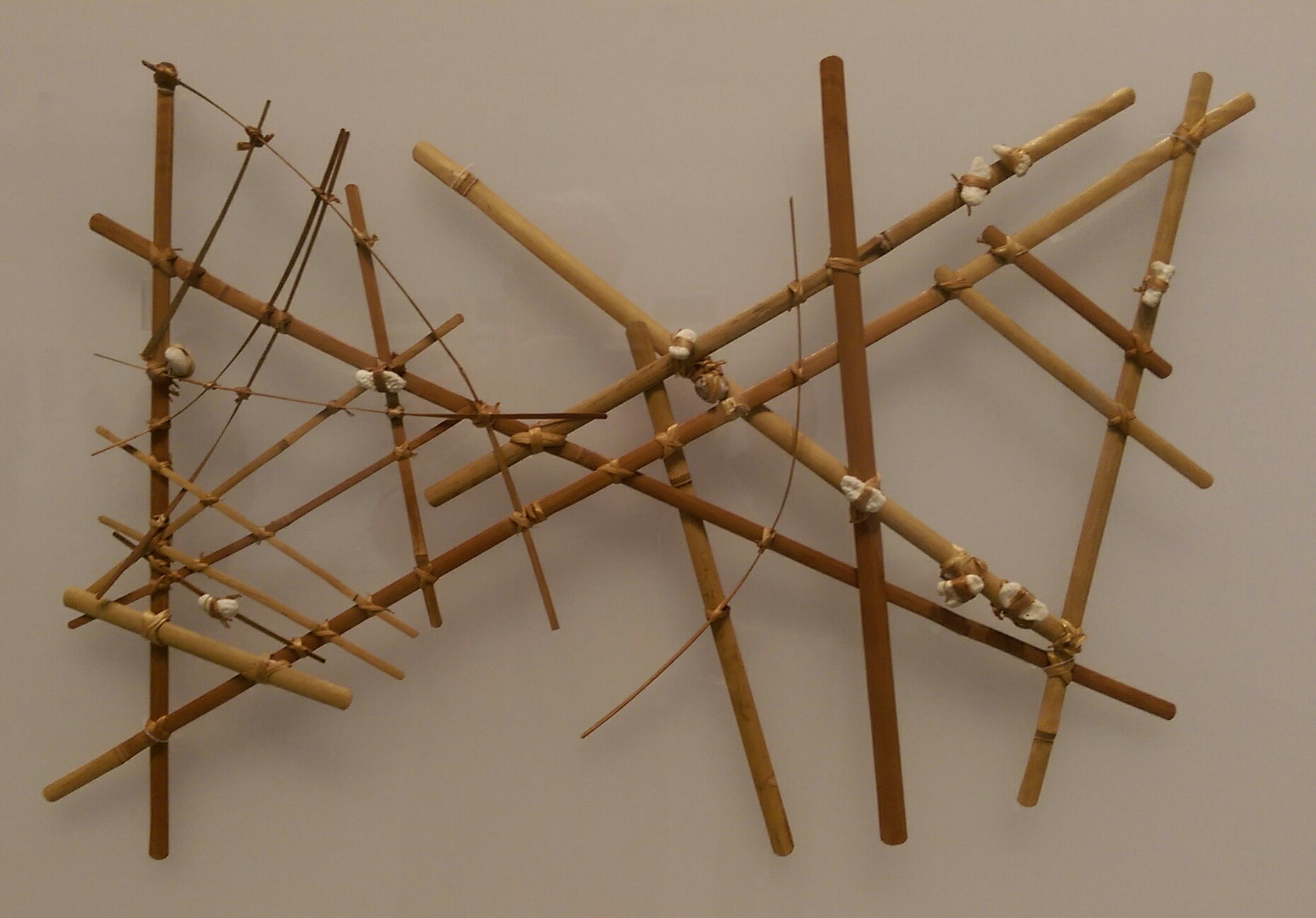
A navigational chart from the Marshall Islands, made of wood, sennit fiber and cowrie shells

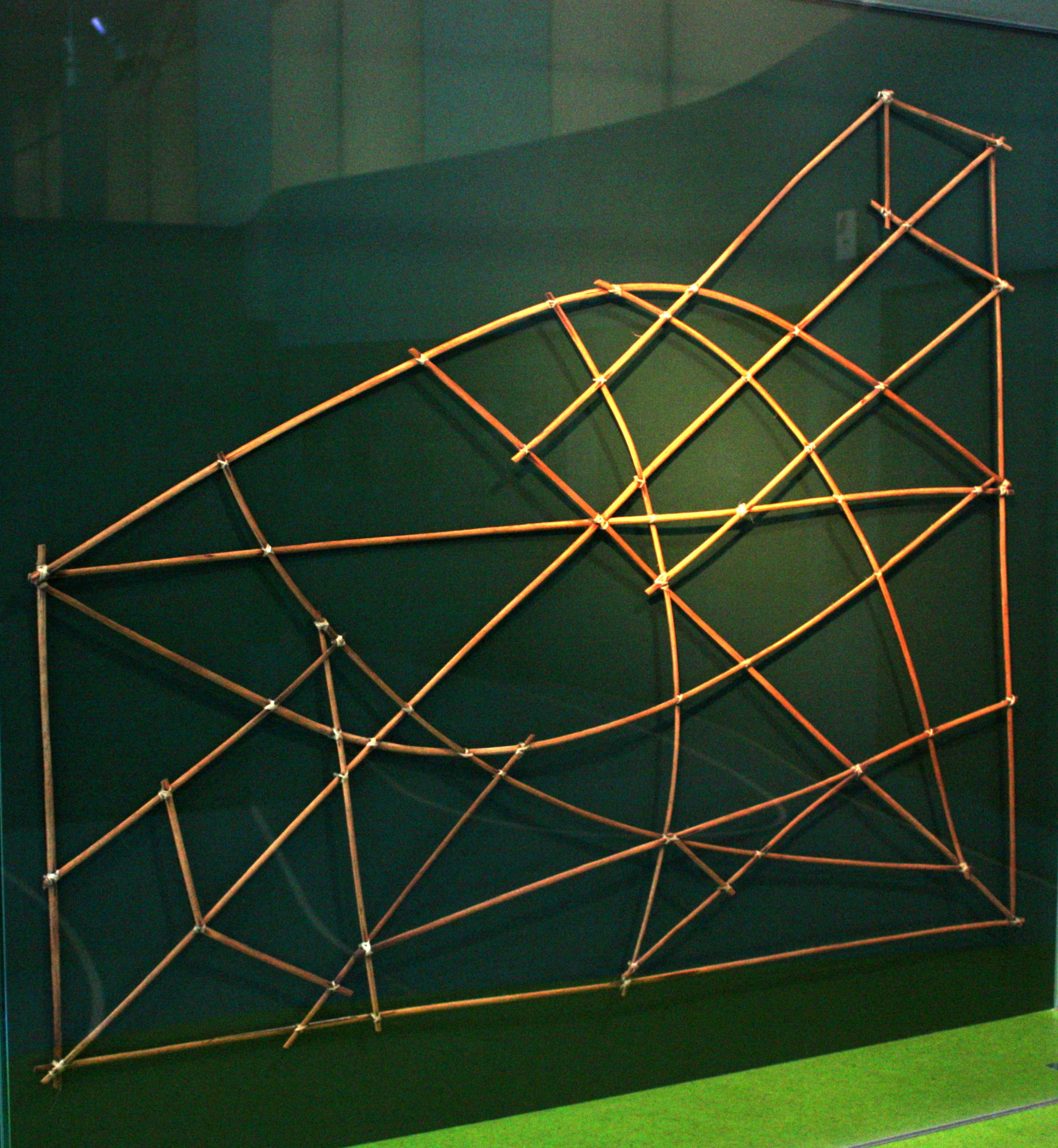
Stick chart in Überseemuseum Bremen

Navigators could also observe the direction of the wave and swell formations to navigate caused by islands. Many of the habitable areas of the Pacific Ocean are groups of islands (or atolls) in chains hundreds of kilometres long. Island chains have predictable effects on waves and currents. Navigators who lived within a group of islands would learn the effect various islands had on the swell shape, direction, and motion, and would have been able to correct their path accordingly. Even when they arrived in the vicinity of an unfamiliar chain of islands, they may have been able to detect signs similar to those of their home.

The energy transferred from the wind to the sea produces wind waves. The waves that are created when the energy travels down away from the source area (like ripples) are known as swell. When the winds are strong at the source area, the swell is larger. The longer the wind blows, the longer the swell lasts. Because the swells of the ocean can remain consistent for days, navigators relied on them to carry their canoe in a straight line from one house (or point) on the star compass to the opposite house of the same name. Navigators were not always able to see stars; because of this, they relied on the swells of the ocean. Swell patterns are a much more reliable method of navigation than waves, which are determined by the local winds. Swells move in a straight direction which makes it easier for the navigator to determine whether the canoe is heading in the correct direction.

The people of the Marshall Islands have a history of using stick charts, to serve as spatial representations of islands and the conditions around them; with the curvature and meeting-points of the coconut ribs indicating the wave motion that was the result of islands standing in the path of the prevailing wind and the run of the waves. The charts represented major ocean swell patterns and the ways the islands disrupted those patterns, typically determined by sensing disruptions in ocean swells by islands during sea navigation. Most stick charts were made from the midribs of coconut fronds that were tied together to form an open framework. Island locations were represented by shells tied to the framework, or by the lashed junction of two or more sticks. The threads represented prevailing ocean surface wave-crests and directions they took as they approached islands and met other similar wave-crests formed by the ebb and flow of breakers. Individual charts varied so much in form and interpretation that the individual navigator who made the chart was the only person who could fully interpret and use it. The use of stick charts ended after World War II when new electronic technologies made navigation more accessible and travel among islands by canoe lessened.

== Vessels ==
- Wa (watercraft)
- Sakman
- Baurua
- Walap

== Sources ==
- Lewis, David (1963), "A Return Voyage Between Puluwat and Saipan Using Micronesian Navigational Techniques", in Finney, Ben R (ed.), Pacific Navigation and Voyaging, The Polynesian Society.
- Lewis, David (1994), We the Navigators: The Ancient art of Landfinding in the Pacific, University of Hawaii Press.
- O’Connor, M.R. (2019). Wayfinding: The Science and Mystery of How Humans Navigate the World. St. Martin's Press. ISBN 978-1250096968.
