= Etak (navigation) =

Island-based mnemonic dead reckoning

etak is a word of Micronesian origin for a distinctive cognitive and mnemonic approach to oceanic navigation and orientation involving a notional reference point or "island", called etak, and triangulation based on it. The system under that name was found in the Caroline Islands, and the literal meaning of etak is "refuge". Alfred Gell described it as a way of encoding dead reckoning applied to sea journeys. It is an example of a dynamic cognitive map.

== Technique ==
The etak is used abstractly, because its typical distance from the route taken exceeds that to the horizon. Star sightings are used to refer to its current bearings from the boat. The navigational stars that are referred to therefore change during a leg of a voyage with a given etak. This phenomenon leads to the use of a relative frame, in which the boat is considered to be at rest, while the etak moves. Equivalently, the etak is the common point of a pencil of lines, based at the vertex of a triangle opposite the route of the boat. The lines are named in terms of celestial navigation.

== Field work ==
Navigation on the islands of Puluwat, Satawal and Woleai was described in published work by Ernst Sarfert in 1911, and in later work by Sarfert and Hans Damm of 1935. The practical techniques used by the navigators of ocean-going canoes were researched by Thomas Gladwin and David Lewis, and published in the early 1970s.

== See also ==
- Fanuankuwel
- Kafeŕoor
