= Hipour =

Navigator from Puluwat, Micronesia

Hipour was a master navigator from the navigational school of Weriyeng and the island of Puluwat.

He is notable for teaching author Thomas Gladwin the art of navigation for his 1970 book, East Is a Big Bird, which greatly reinvigorated interest in traditional Pacific celestial navigation.

Hipour also accompanied David Henry Lewis on his ketch Isbjorn from Puluwat to Saipan and back, using traditional navigation techniques, which helped to fuel a renaissance in voyaging between the Caroline and Mariana Islands.

== See also ==
- Fanuankuwel
- Kafeŕoor
- Mau Piailug
- Polynesian navigation
- Wa (watercraft)
