= Wa (watercraft) =

Type of outrigger canoe from the Caroline Islands

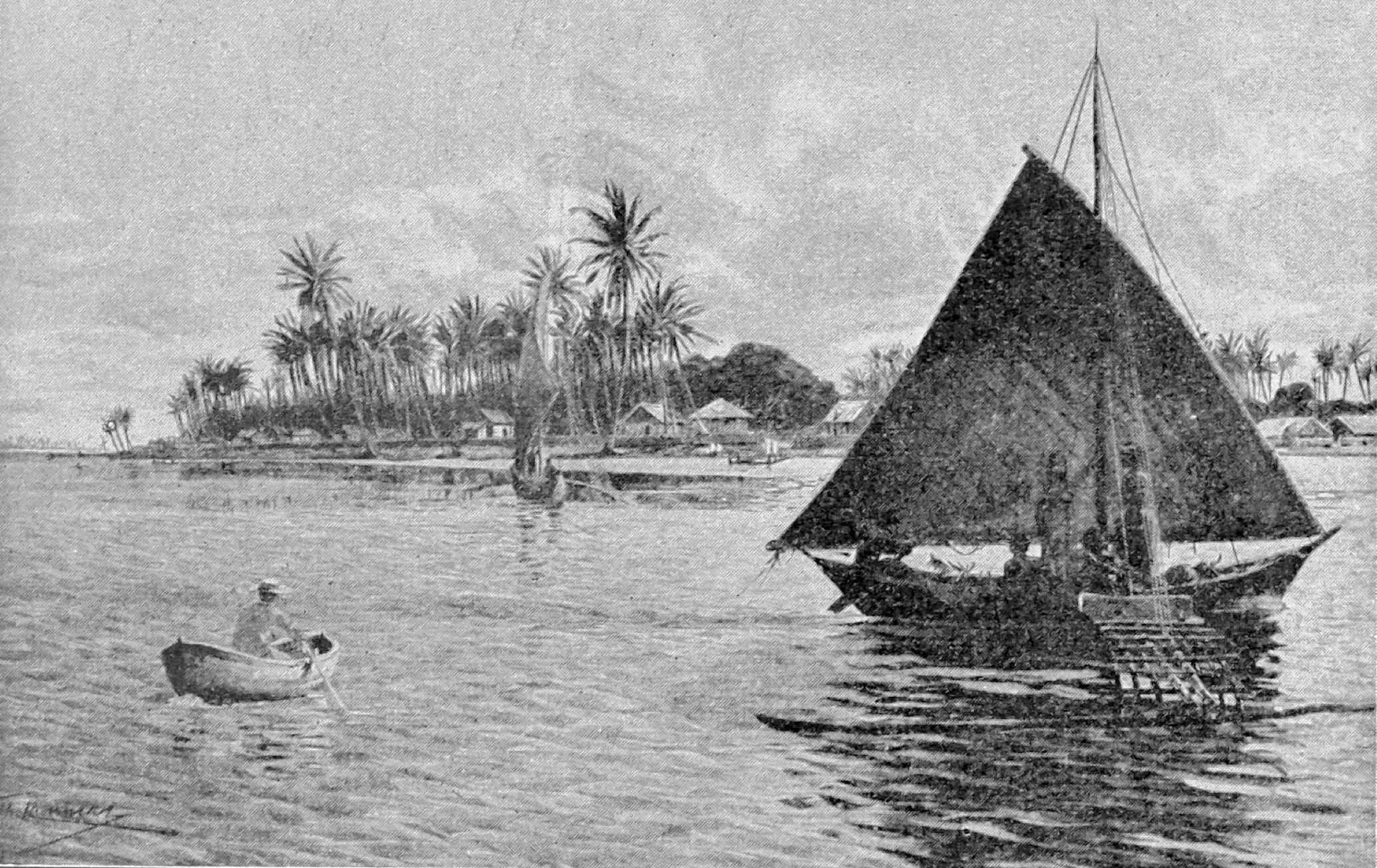
Wa in the Marshall Islands/Caroline Islands area, prior to 1911

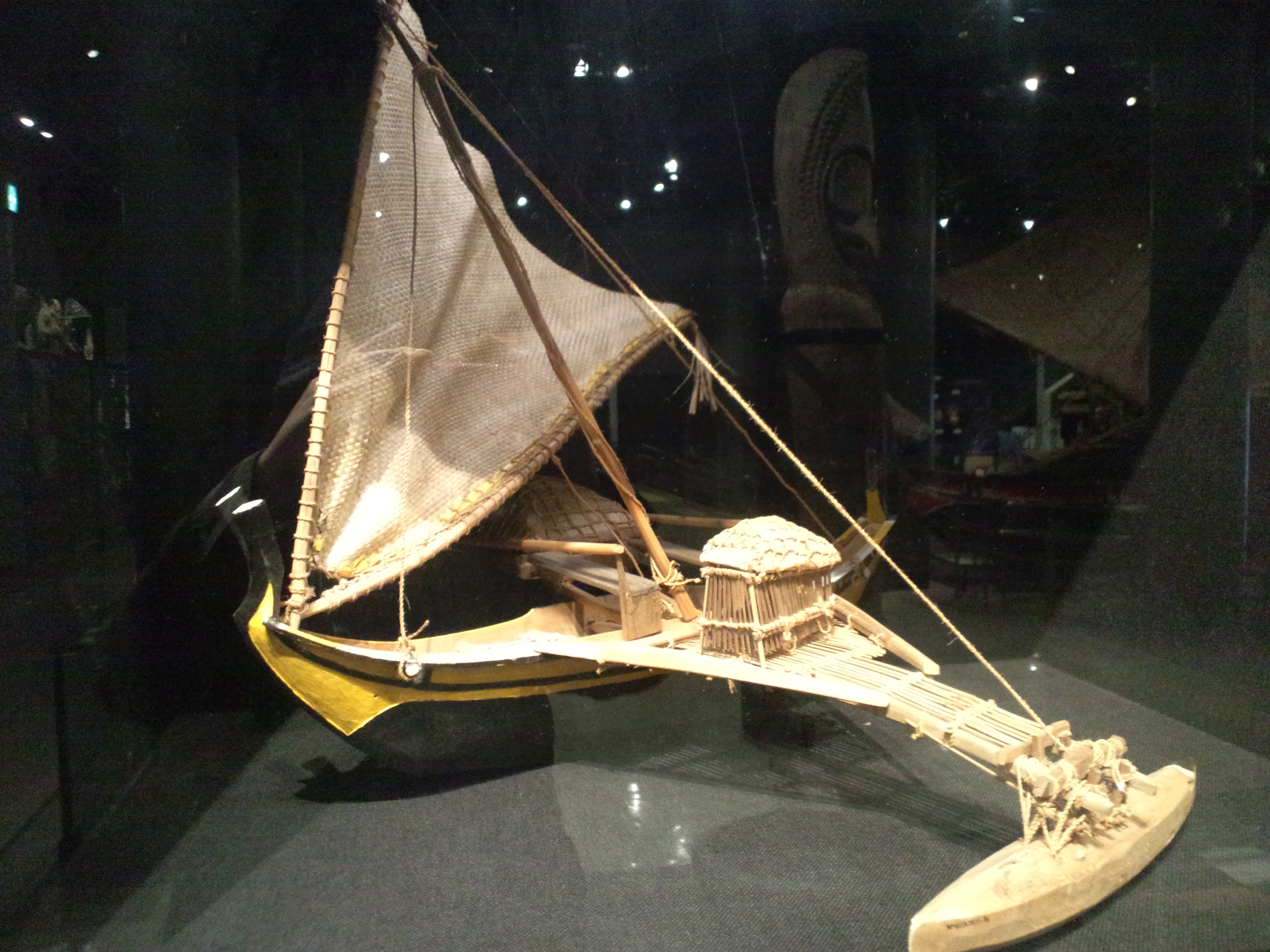
Model of a wa from Woleai in the National Museum of Ethnology (Japan)

Wa are traditional sailing outrigger canoes of the Caroline Islands, which also includes Palau and Yap. They have a single outrigger. They are similar to the sakman of the Northern Marianas.

== Design and construction ==
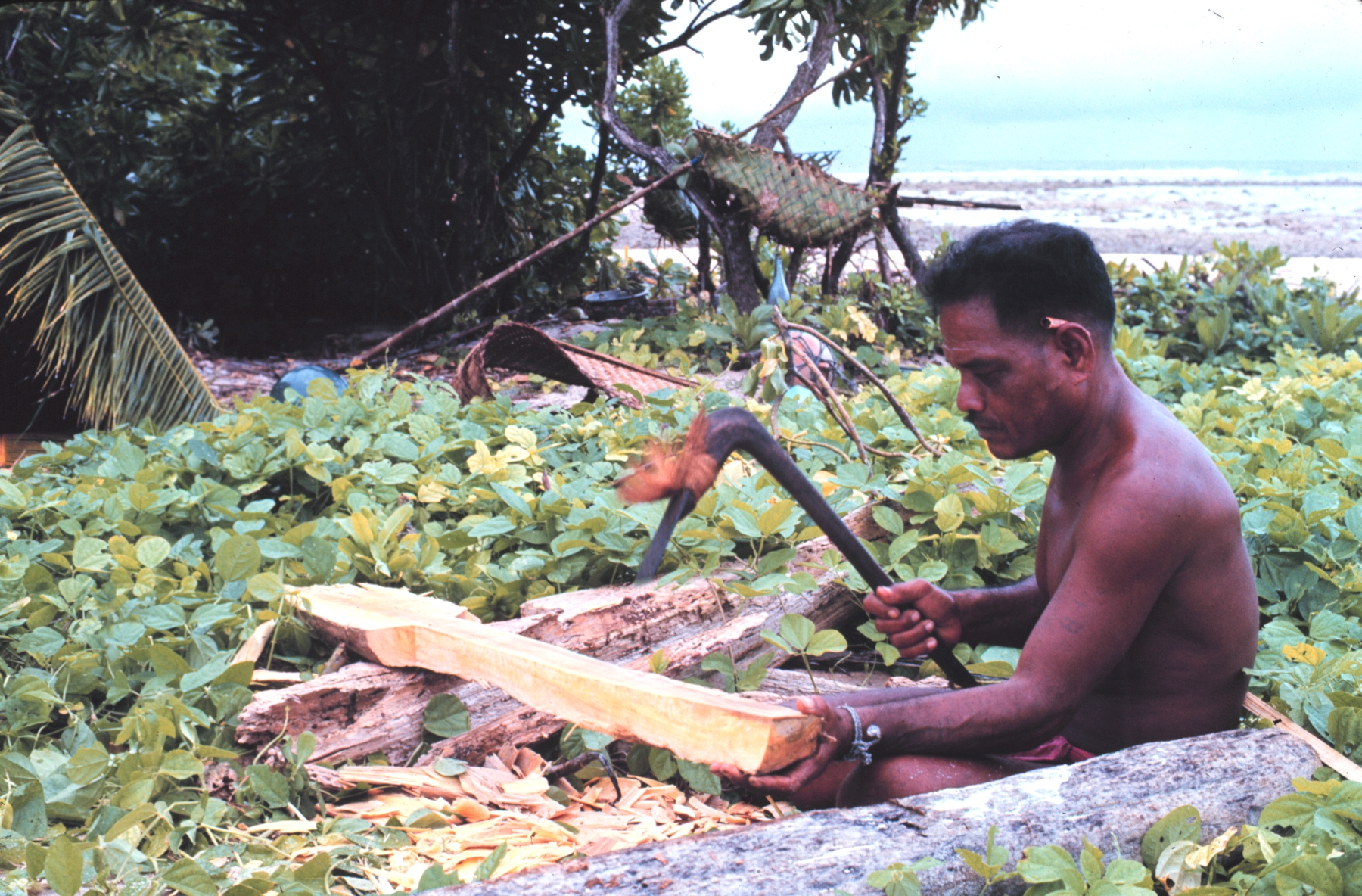
Islander of Tobi, Palau, making a paddle with an adze

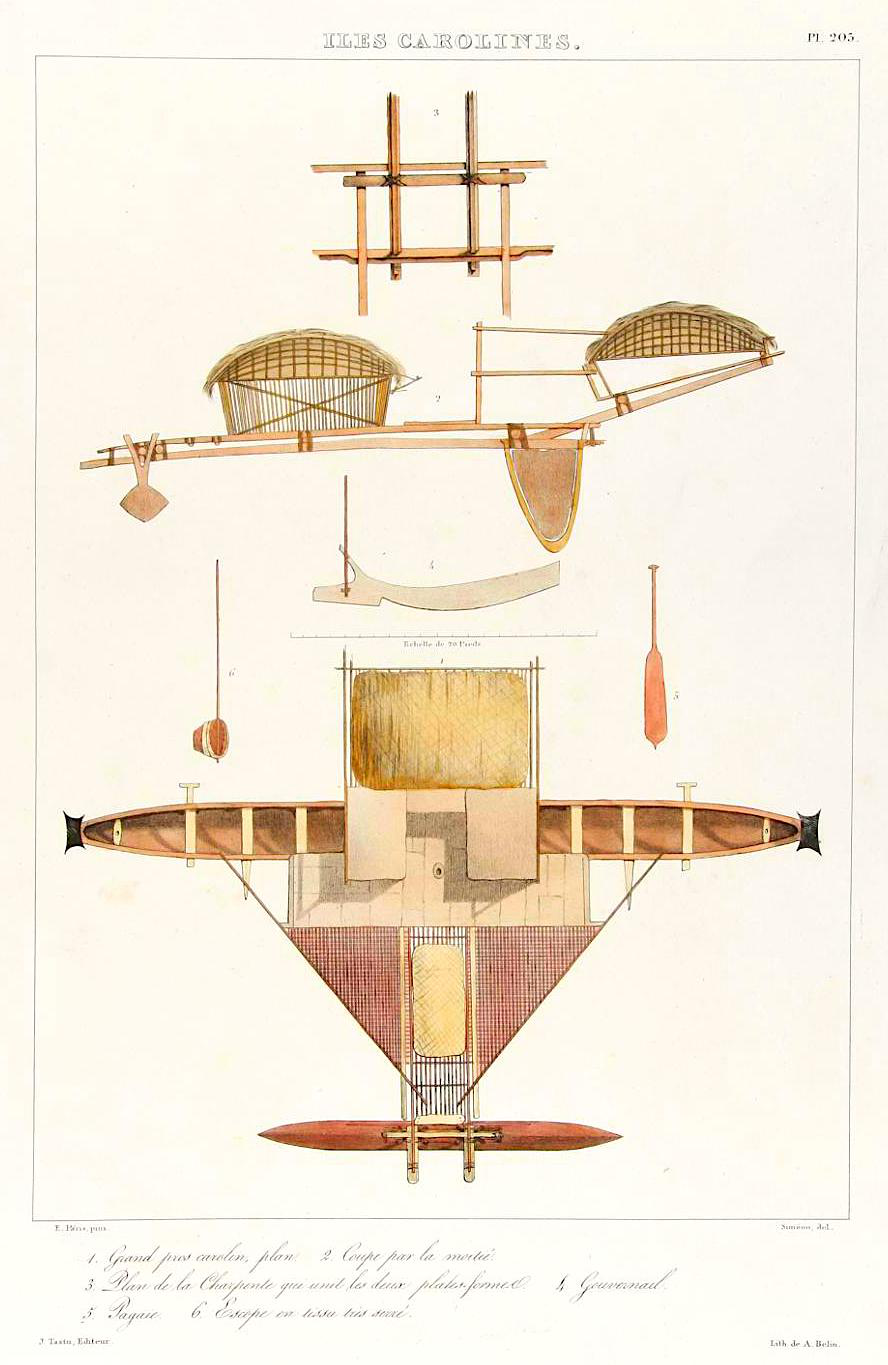
Plan of a Caroline Islands wa featuring sunshades. Lithograph by Admiral François-Edmond Pâris, ca. 1826–1829.

Wa are proa — vessels with identical bow and stern, allowing the craft to reverse without turning. (Note: "How dextrously they are fitted for ranging this collection of Islands called the Ladrones: since as these Islands bear nearly N and S of each other, and are all within the limits of the trade winds, the Proas, by sailing most excellently on a wind, and with either end foremost, can run from one of these Islands to the other and back again, only by shifting the sail, without even putting about; and by the flatness of their lee side, and their small breadth, they are capable of lying much nearer the wind than any vessel hitherto known, and thereby have an advantage, which no vessels that go large can ever pretend to: The advantage I mean is that of running with a velocity nearly as great, and perhaps sometimes greater than what the wind blows with.") They are made from hewn-out hulls, typically breadfruit trunks, (Note: "Repunglug and Repunglap chose to use a canoe belonging to their clan and it was made ready for the voyage. The canoe, adzed from breadfruit planks in the traditional Carolinian manner, is approximately 26 feet long, and at the time was equipped with a canvas sail.") with single wide top-strakes, and carved head and stern pieces. (Note: "These hewn-out hulls with single wide top-strakes sewn on, and carved head and stern pieces, remind us of New Zealand craft.") Sails are lateen rigged (Note: "The sail is of the lateen form, with two yards, and the mast nearly upright") and were traditionally made of pandanus mat sailcloth. Benjamin Morrell recorded in the 1830s that sails were "made in small pieces of about three feet square, sewed together. In cutting the sail to its proper shape, the pieces which come off one side answer to go on the other; this gives it the proper form, and causes the halliards to be bent on in the middle of the yard." (Note: "The sails are made in small pieces of about three feet square, sewed together. In cutting the sail to its proper shape, the pieces which come off one side answer to go on the other; this gives it the proper form, and causes the halliards to be bent on in the middle of the yard.") After World War II sails switched to canvas, and after 1973 the use of dacron began to increase. (Note: "As of 1973, all canoes on Satawal were using dacron sails sewn by the men themselves. Most Carolinian canoes had used canvas acquired during the Japanese presence in the islands. The people of Satawal, however, were reluctant to switch from the cumbersome pandanus-mat sails, probably because canoes and voyaging were included in the elaborate pre-Christian taboo system. Christianity took hold on Satawal during the decades after World War II, and the islanders then used canvas. When I and Gary Mount, as Peace Corps volunteers, demonstrated the obvious superiority of dacron over canvas with only a 4-inch square sample, the men agreed to purchase sails for the canoes of the island. As word of the superiority of dacron spread, the people of Ifalik, Elato, Woleai, Pulusuk, Pulap and Puluwat have equipped at least one canoe on each island with dacron.")

Early accounts agreed upon "a lee-platform on the side opposite to the outrigger-frame, which also has a large platform of poles laid athwart its booms, whereon men are stationed to counterbalance any excessive heeling over toward the lee side when the wind increases in force". The windward float stabilizes the craft. This occurs "by its weight rather than its buoyancy. When the float becomes submerged in a wave its increased drag swings the canoe slightly around into the wind, thereby relieving some of the wind pressure on the sail. The canoe slows down temporarily and allows the float to rise again." (Note: "The outrigger with its float also adds considerably to the sailing performance, as it is always turned windward. As Gladwin points out in reference to Caroline Island canoes, this 'is done so that the force of the wind on the sail will tend to lift the outrigger float out of the water, not push it down'. Thus the float acts as a stabilising agent by its weight rather than its buoyancy. When the float becomes submerged in a wave its increased drag swings the canoe slightly around into the wind, thereby relieving some of the wind pressure on the sail. The canoe slows down temporarily and allows the float to rise again.") This design feature also acts to reduce drift by tending to place the wind toward the beam or side of the craft. (Note: "an outrigger canoe will tend to position itself with the wind on the beam and thus lessen the drift")

On Poluwat, the skill of canoe building is called héllap ("great rigging"), and different schools of canoe carpentry include hálinruk ("Rope of Truk") and hálinpátu ("Rope of the four Western Islands"). (Note: "Non-yitang knowledge is organised differently. Some skills are called háák (pandanus mat), e.g., hákinpwe (mat of divination). Or the word for the sleeping mat, loh, may be used, e.g., lohanppalô (mat of navigator). Tawuweru refers to his non-yitang navigational knowledge as his kiyen nóómw (mat of the atoll; kiy- is another name for pandanus mat and is most commonly used as a possessive classifier for such mats). The skill of canoe building is called a"rigging", Héllap (Great rigging), as are the different schools of canoe carpentry, e.g., Hálinruk (Rope of Truk), Hálinpátu (Rope of the four Western Islands).)

On Yap (at least the Yap Main Islands), canoes in general are known as m'uw. The open-ocean type with the two-pronged "tails" are called powpow (linguistically similar to the Polynesian paopao but different in design and purpose). While very similar in design to the wa of the rest of the Caroline Islands, one of the few distinctions between the two versions is the two-pronged tails; the Yap Main Islands' version tends to be a bigger ornament compared to the more wood-conservative version found in the tree-scarce atolls of the Carolines.

== Speed and means of propulsion ==
Wa may be sailed over long distances, paddled, or moved by punting. One analysis of wa under sail indicated "conclusively that these primitive craft are superior to a modern boat on significant points of sailing." They were estimated by Anson in 1776 to be able to move at or perhaps beyond wind speed, and to have better windward pointing ability than any craft previously encountered. (Note: "... and by the flatness of their lee side, and their small breadth, they are capable of lying much nearer the wind than any vessel hitherto known, and thereby have an advantage, which no vessels that go large can ever pretend to: The advantage I mean is that of running with a velocity nearly as great, and perhaps sometimes greater than what the wind blows with.") Several early western observers stated they were "capable of 22 knots (41 km/h; 25 mph) for sustained periods". (Note: "The Micronesian flying proa is said by several witnesses to have been capable of 22 knots for sustained periods.") Edwin Doran, author of Wangka: Austronesian Canoe Origins (1981), cited a 14-knot (26 km/h; 16 mph) average for a wa traveling from Guam to Manila. Benjamin Morrell reported in 1831 that he had "seen these boats going at the rate of eight miles per hour (13 km/h), within four points of the wind" and that he had "no doubt but they will go at the rate of twelve or thirteen [13 miles (21 km)] miles an hour in smooth water". (Note: "I have seen these boats going at the rate of eight miles an hour, within four points of the wind. But let them run large, or before the wind, with a strong breeze, and I have no doubt but they will go at the rate of twelve or thirteen miles an hour in smooth water.")

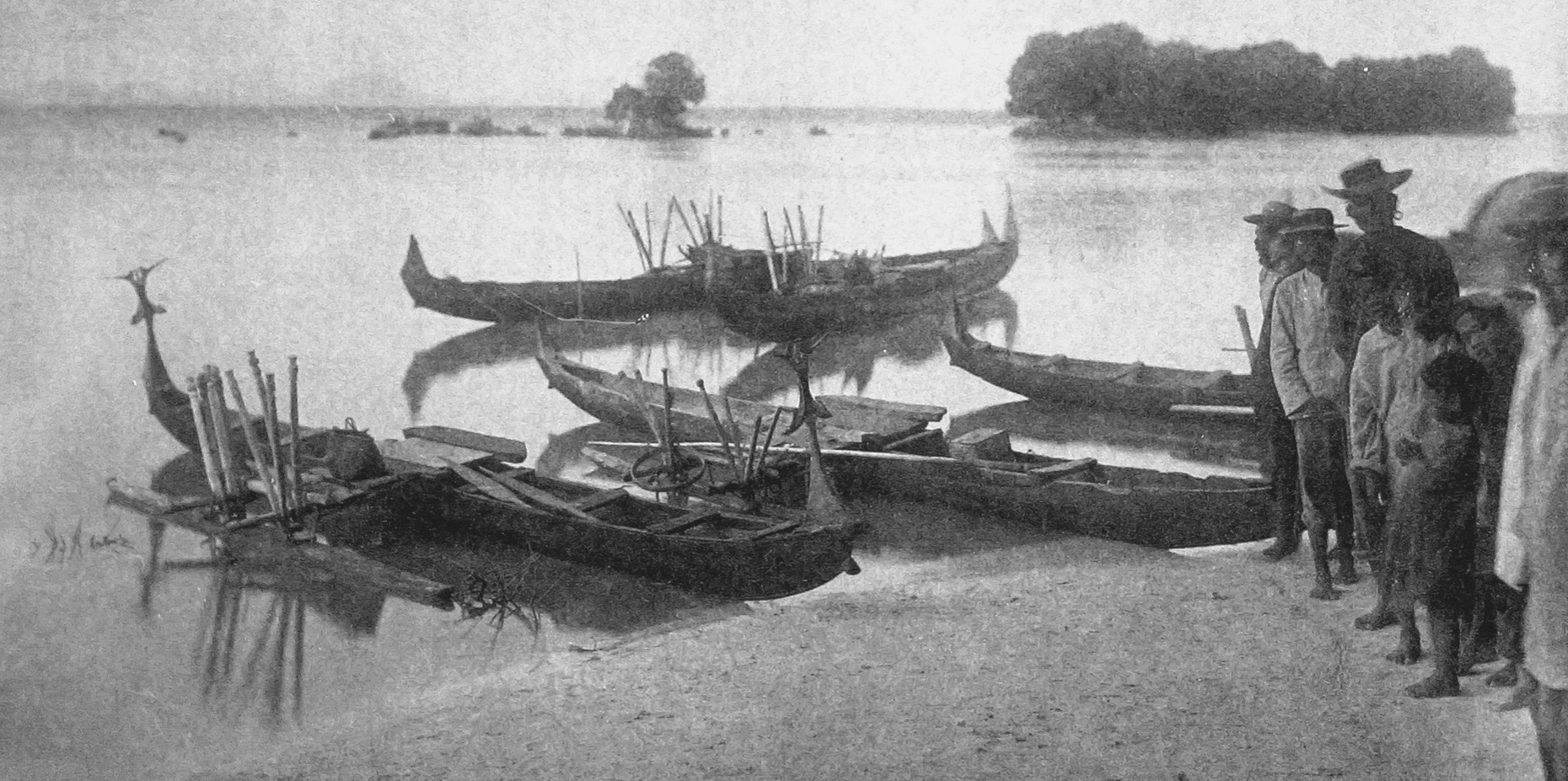
Close up of wa beached at Truk Lagoon, 1899-1900.

== Use and range ==
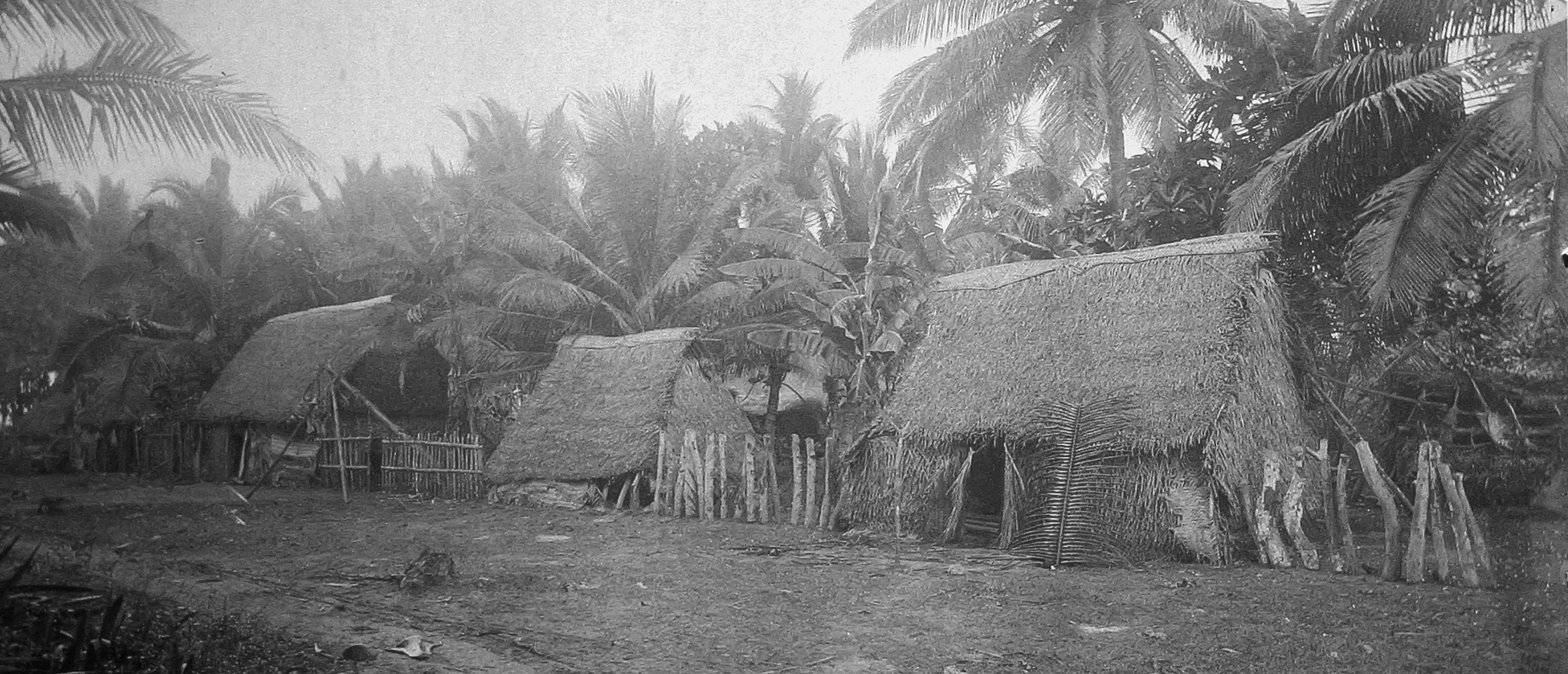
Village of Caroline Islanders near Agana, Guam, Mariana Islands, 1899–1900

In the past, voyages of 150 miles (240 km) across open ocean were commonplace, and a "brisk trade" was carried on with the Mariana Islands to the north. (Note: "The people belong to the brown Polynesian stock, are strongly built, and are gentle, amiable, and intelligent; they are bold sailors, and carry on a brisk trade with the Ladrones to the north, where they have several settlements.") Trade items included shells, tapa cloth, wooden vessels, cordage, iron, copper, nails and knives. (Note: "In the 19th century, the people of the Carolines resumed their ancient expeditions to the Marianas, bringing with them shells, tapa, wooden vessels and cordage in exchange for pieces of iron, copper, nails and knives.") Rai stones were brought from Palau to Yap. (Note: "The natives of Yap in Micronesia went 300 miles to the Palau Islands for"stone money", great calcite disks, six to twelve feet in diameter.) Physical evidence of contact with the Chamorro people of Guam in the far southern Mariana Islands includes pestles, fish hooks, and shell rings from the Caroline Islands." The earliest documentary evidence is Friar Juan Cantova's 1721 letter to Friar William D'Aubenton in which he describes the June 19, 1721 landing of canoes from Woleai on Guam. (Note: "The first fully documented and detailed account of Carolinians on Guam was given by Fr. Juan Cantova in a letter to Fr. Wm. D'Aubenton in which he describes the landing of canoes from Woleai in the Central Carolines on Guam June 19, 1721.") During the same Spanish colonial period, many Chamorro people died due to introduced disease or were forcibly relocated from Saipan to Guam, and Caroline Islanders emigrated to Saipan in their place. (Note: "The Carolinian people of the island of Saipan are descended from adventurers who sailed their canoes to the Marianas Islands from their atoll homes in the south. But it has been many years, almost 70 by those still able to remember, since the Carolinians of Saipan have seen the sails of canoes approach the island from their ancestral homes. 1 During the preceding centuries, the people of the Central Carolines had made contact with the Spanish on Guam and had colonised the island of Saipan.") By 1788 fleets from the Caroline Islands were sailing to Guam near annually to trade in iron and other goods. (Note: "By 1788, large groups of canoes from the Carolines were sailing to Guam almost annually for trade goods and iron.") In the same year, a canoe from Woleai arrived at Guam and told the Spanish that "they had always been trading with Guam and had only discontinued their voyaging after witnessing the cruelty of the Europeans." (Note: "There is also evidence which would seem to confirm pre-European contacts between the Carolines and Marianas. In 1788, a canoe from Woleai arrived at Guam; the occupants told the Spanish that they had always been trading with Guam and had only discontinued their voyaging after witnessing the cruelty of the Europeans.")

In 1821, Adelbert von Chamisso recorded a voyage of 2,300 miles (3,700 km) from Yap to Aur Atoll in the Ratak Chain of the Marshall Islands. (Note: "Chamisso records a voyage of 2,300 miles from Yap in the Carolines to Aur in the Rataks.") Long voyages of at least 1,000 miles (1,600 km) between the Carolines, Philippines and Marianas were frequent. (Note: Micronesian proas were frequently going backwards and forwards over distances of at least 1,000 miles between the Carolines and the Philippines and the Marianas.) A canoe from Satawal made a 500 miles (800 km) voyage to Saipan in 1970. Star courses between islands were known on Puluwat for all major islands from Tobi, south-west of Palau, to Makin in the Gilbert Islands – clear evidence of repeated trips over various parts of this 3,000 miles (4,800 km)-long region. According to the 1911 Encyclopædia Britannica Eleventh Edition, the Caroline Islands natives "who are Micronesian hybrids of finer physique than their kinsmen of the Pelew Islands, have a comparatively high mental standard, being careful agriculturists, and peculiarly clever boatbuilders and navigators."

The captain of a sea-going canoe in the Central Carolines commands as aids to his navigation far more than knowledge of the mountain tops that rise just above the level of the sea to form the dozen or two dozen islands that he visits. To him, the ocean's surface is studded with hundreds, perhaps thousands, of other things, whose names, locations, and relationships he knows, and which function as sea-marks for him. Some of them are real enough phenomena; some must seem to us to be in the realm of the fabulous. There are the islets, the reefs, the sandbanks; perhaps also the discoloured patch of water or the shark that is always to be found at a particular reef is also real; but then there are the two-headed whale, the hovering frigate bird with the plover constantly flying circles around it, the spirit who lives in a flame, the man in a canoe made of ferns. And all of these, the real islands and the fantastic monsters alike, are permanent geographical features; all of them are more or less useful sea-marks, all of them bear names, and all of them are seriously regarded—though not all are equally important—as navigational aids.

— Saul H. Riesenberg, Smithsonian Institution (1972)

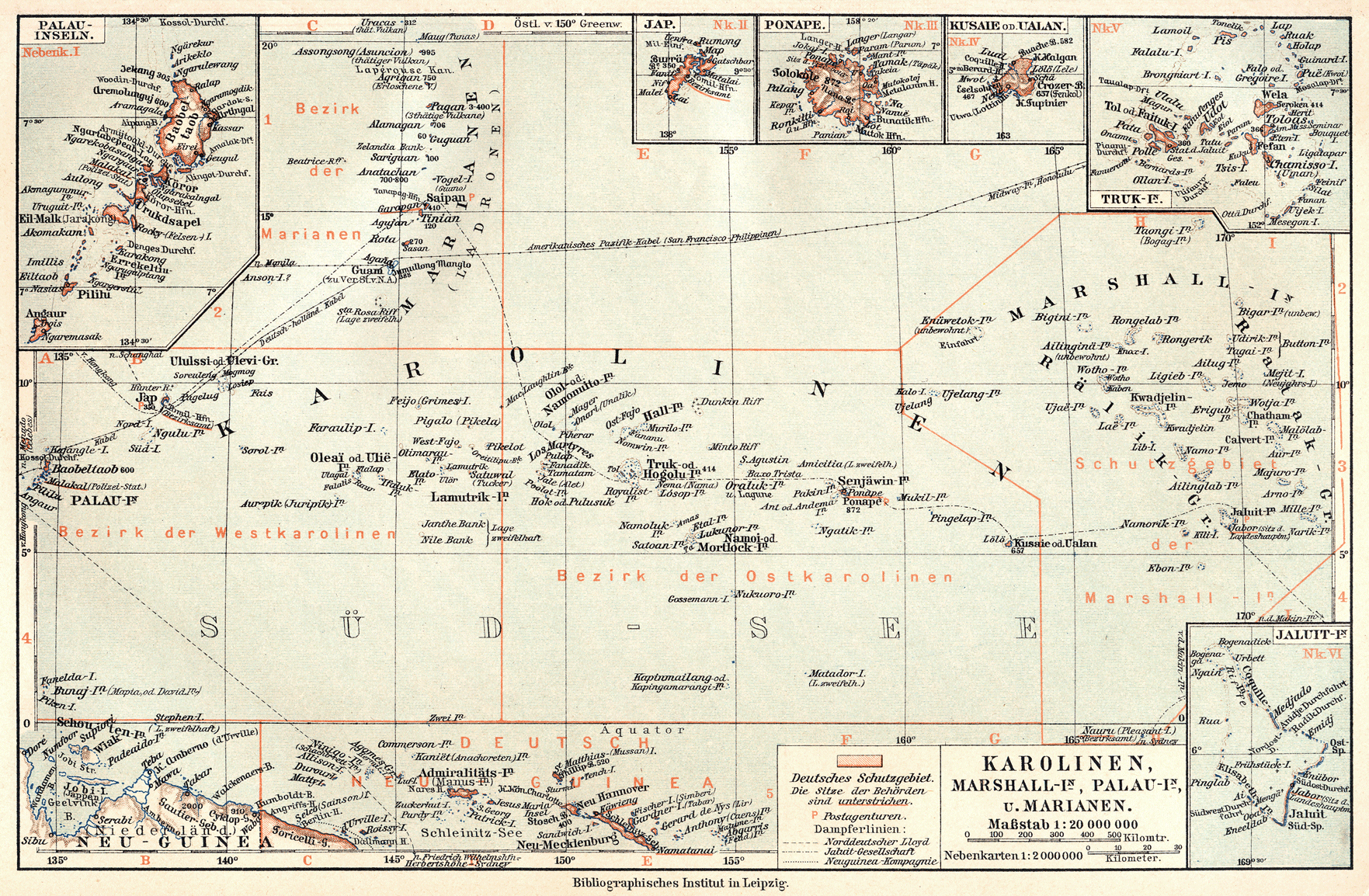
Historic German colonial era map of the Caroline, Marshall, Mariana and Palau island groups, showing an approximate domain of local wa voyaging

There are a larger number of stars grouped around the east–west axis of this navigation system – since the Caroline Islands are an east–west island chain, most voyages occur in those directions, and for seven to eight months of the year the dominant winds are north easterly. (Note: "Gladwin also points out that the large number of stars grouped around the east–west axis of this imaginary diagram is useful in sailing in the Carolines for the islands lie in an east–west chain, and most voyages are made in these directions. This is one more difficulty the men faced in their voyage, for they were sailing a course almost due north and the lack of navigational stars in that part of the sky made their allowable margin of error small indeed. However, Repunglug and the rest of his crew weren't worried, for in this instance they had the wind in their favour. During other times of the year, prevailing winds often make sailing difficult. When travelling east in the Carolines, one must often tack against the north-east trades 7 or 8 months of the year; if travelling west one has a relatively easier time. In contrast, when sailing on a northerly course (the geographical bearing from Saipan to West Fayu is 353 degrees) one must wait for an easterly wind.") These dominant winds are referred to as etiu-mai-rakena-efang (or "a wind coming from north of east"). (Note: "a true wind direction of 60–70 degrees (a wind direction of Etiu-mai-rakena-efang, or 'a wind coming from north of east.'")

According to the contentious historian Andrew Sharp, earlier observers Otto von Kotzebue and Louis de Freycinet's information suggests that long distance voyaging was seasonally limited, that "the seasonal south-west monsoon was feared by the Caroline voyagers", that normal steady trade winds from the north-east were preferred, and that the boats – once turtled – were troublesome to right. (Note: "According to Kotzebue's and de Freycinet's information, the seasonal south-west monsoon was feared by the Caroline voyagers. They preferred to sail by the steady trade wind from the north-east. The praus were liable to be overset, and both Kotzebue and de Freycinet give pictures of the trouble the crews had in righting them. [...] The Caroline praus, as de Freycinet said, were suited to the fact that in the Micronesian areas the winds in the main sailing season were not unduly violent.")

The Metropolitan Museum of Art in New York holds an artifact – called a "hos" that has a stylized human figure attached to Stingray spines (the purported sources of its power) – they describe as being used in "weather magic, believed to have the ability to prevent or alter the path of approaching storms", which is tentatively ascribed to Yap.

== Decline ==
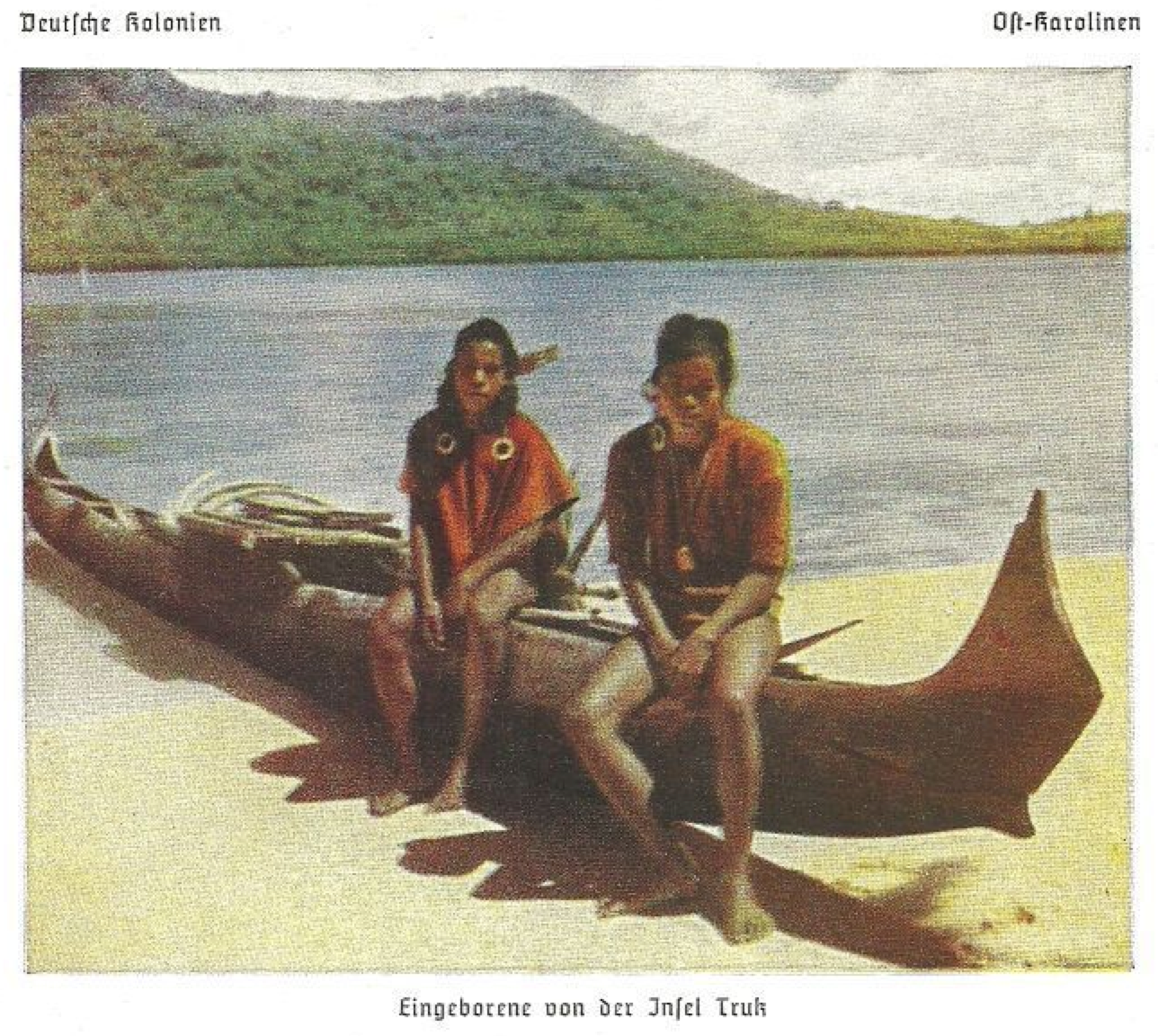
Two Chuuk islanders sitting on a wa, circa 1899–1914

After the German–Spanish Treaty of 1899, inter-island voyaging was discouraged by the German New Guinea and Japanese colonial governments and by the commercial availability of trade goods. This discouragement was, however, not very effective. (Note: "During the occupation of the islands by first the Germans and then the Japanese, inter-island voyaging was discouraged by the foreign administrations and by the fact that trade goods were easily obtainable throughout the Carolines from ships operated by copra-buying companies. This did not stop movement between the islands, however, and today on Satawal there are four families with close marriage ties on Saipan dating from that period. None the less, the use of inter-island steamers capable of carrying passengers and cargo did much to discourage the long-distance voyages that had been undertaken during the nineteenth century to trade for iron tools and other modern commodities.")

A 1966 Peace Corps volunteer reported a fleet of 20 canoes of various sizes, that sailed from five islands within the Woleai atoll to greet an arriving ship, and stated there was only one motorboat at the time. By 1973, only a handful of the canoes were still actively sailed on Woleai, and there were more than 20 motorboats. In 1973 voyaging traditions were reportedly most alive on Satawal, Namonabetiu, and to a lessert extent Namonuito and Ifalik. (Note: "In all of the central Carolines, only the islanders of Satawal, and the atolls known collectively as Namonabetiu (Puluwat, Pulap, Tamatam, and Pulusuk), and to a lesser extent the Nanonuito islands, still regularly sail inter-island canoes. Occasional canoes from Ifalik to the west visit Woleai, and there is one large voyaging canoe on Elato. The state of sailing and inter-island voyaging throughout the rest of the Carolines can be typified by Woleai atoll. In discussions with the first American Peace Corps volunteer to visit the island in late 1966, he remarked about the fleet of - 364 canoes, perhaps 20 of various sizes, that sailed from five islands within the atoll to greet the arriving ship. There was one motorboat in the lagoon at the time. Today, only a handful of the canoes are still actively sailed, and there are over 20 outboard motorboats on Woleai.")

"Long-distance noninstrument voyaging" was still practiced in the area in the late 1980s. (Note: "even in the Caroline Islands of Micronesia, where long-distance noninstrument voyaging is an ongoing concern, Thomas (1987) suggests that we soon may witness 'the last navigator'.")

In 2012, the charity Habele and community-based organization Waa'gey were supporting younger outer-islanders from Lamotrek to gain experience in wa building. (Note: "Habele directors and volunteers have been working to support young men from the Atoll of Lamotrek living on Yap Proper. Yap is the state capital of one of four states in the Federated States of Micronesia (FSM). A club was organized in November of 2011, with weekly meetings in Gargey. The group has set itself very ambitious goals. Working with elders from the Outer Island community on Yap, club members have put coconuts husks to sea, which will be ready for local twine rope making by early 2012. They also started carving a midsize traditional dugout canoe, building towards the goal of initiating the creation a second, much larger canoe by mid 2012. Habele donors will help bear the costs of sending traditional building materials and tools from Lamotrek to Yap and back on the state owned cargo ship to facilitate the process.") (Note: "Men and youths on the remote Pacific atoll of Lamotrek are hard at work, carving and shaping a massive sailing canoe. Voyaging canoes in the Caroline Islands are made from hollowed-out tree trunks for the keel. Planks are then fitted and tied in with rope made from coconut fibers to complete the sides, according to a news release from Waa'gey, a community-based organization that uses traditional skills to confront the social, economic and environmental challenges faced by the people of Micronesia's most remote outer islands.")

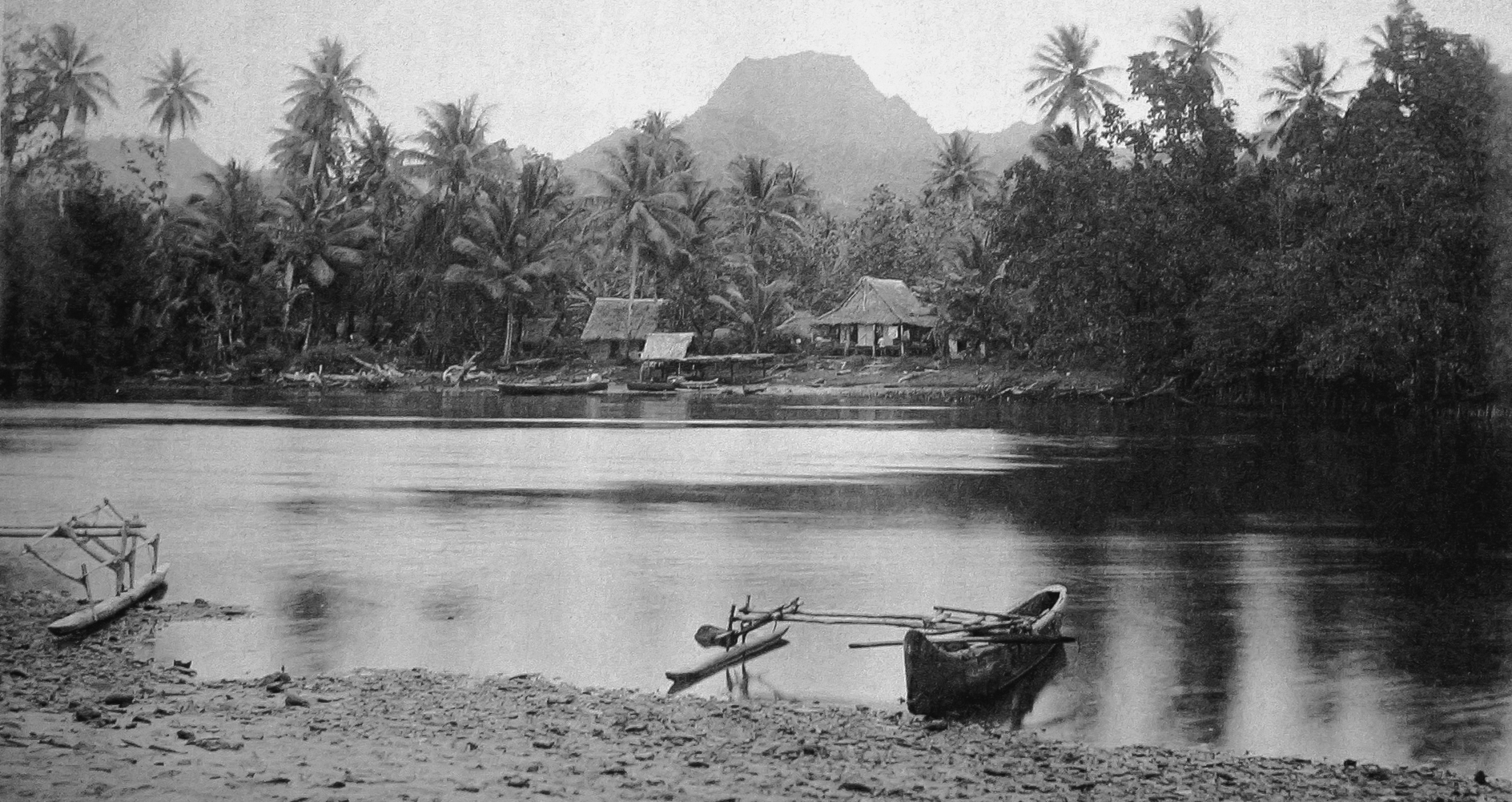
Wa at Fengal Village, Port Lottin, Kusaie, 1899–1900

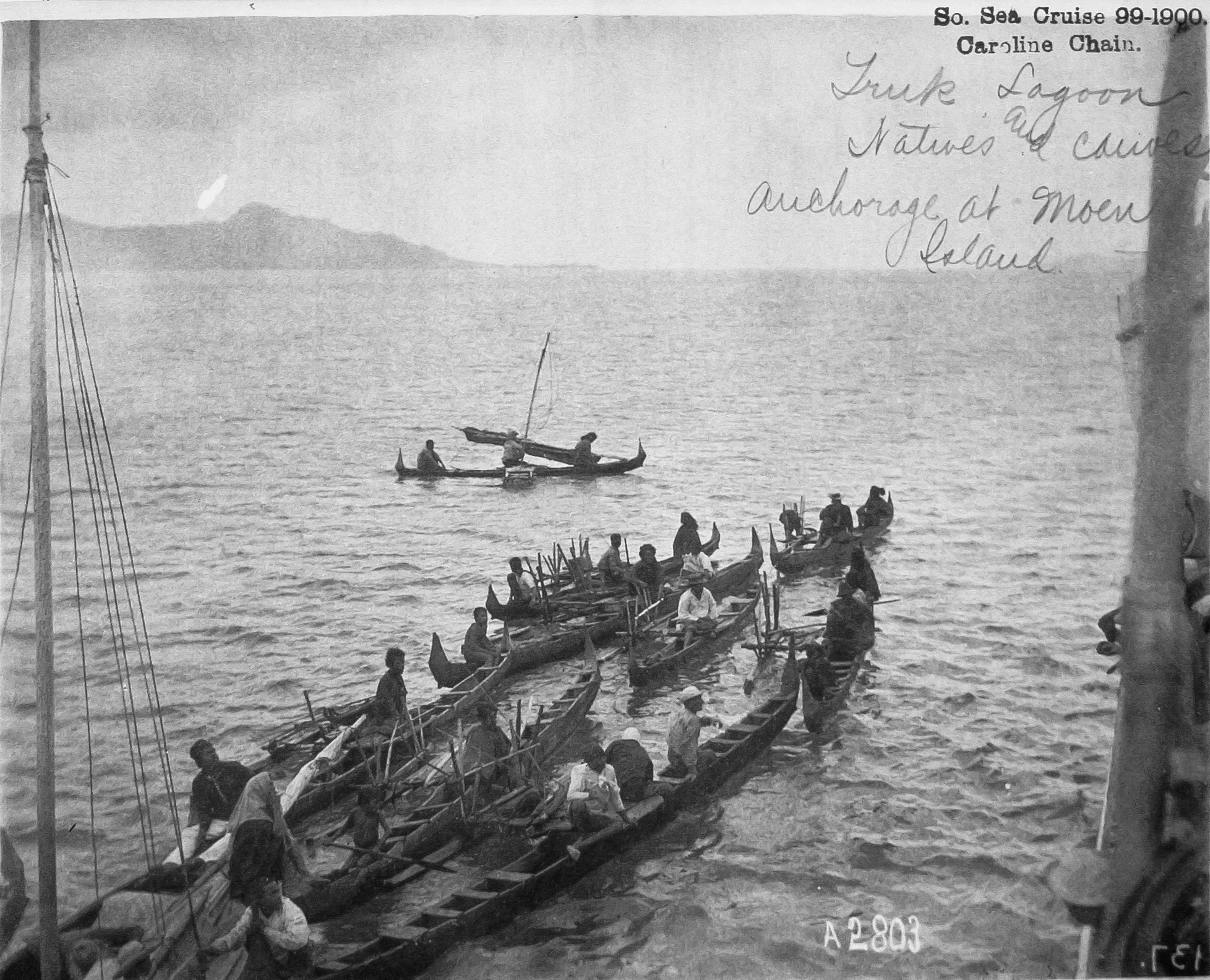
Wa on Truk Lagoon, Moen Island thought to be trading with the steamship Albatross, 1899–1900. Multiple wa have masts up, cordage for mast stays clearly visible to left.

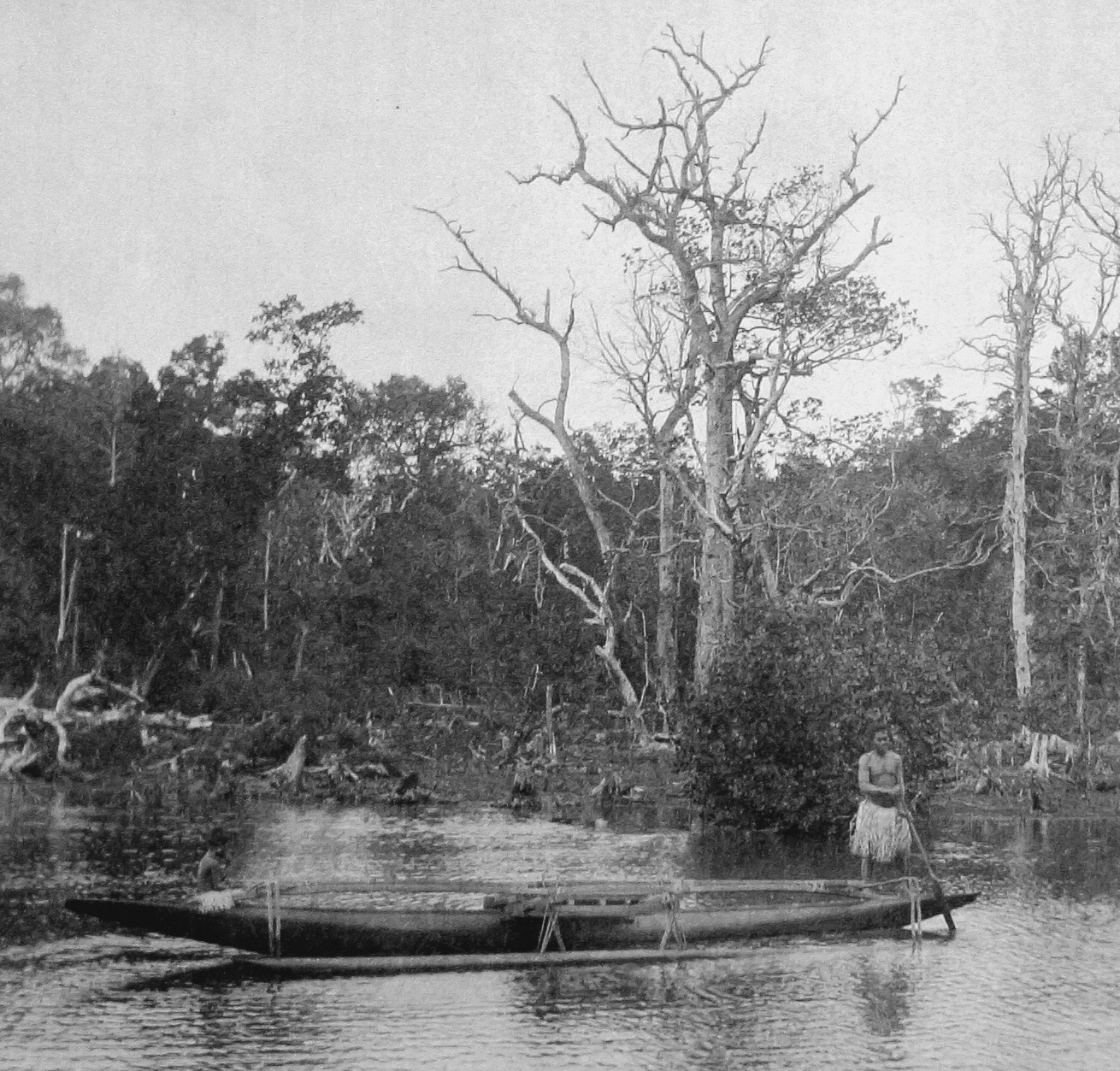
Wa on the Kiti River, Ponape, 1899–1900. Note man and boy in traditional dress.

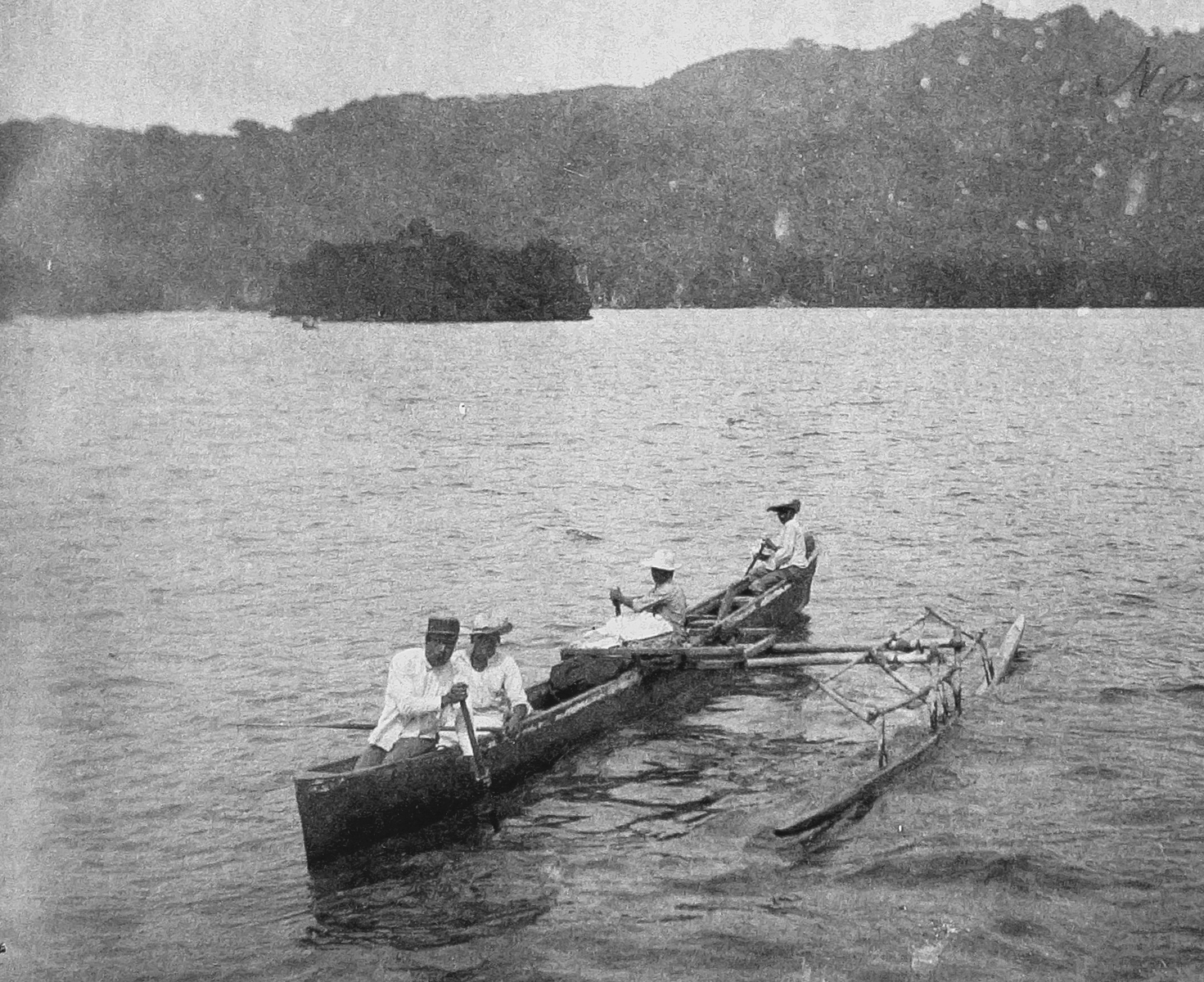
Wa at Port Lottin, Kusaie Island, 1899–1900

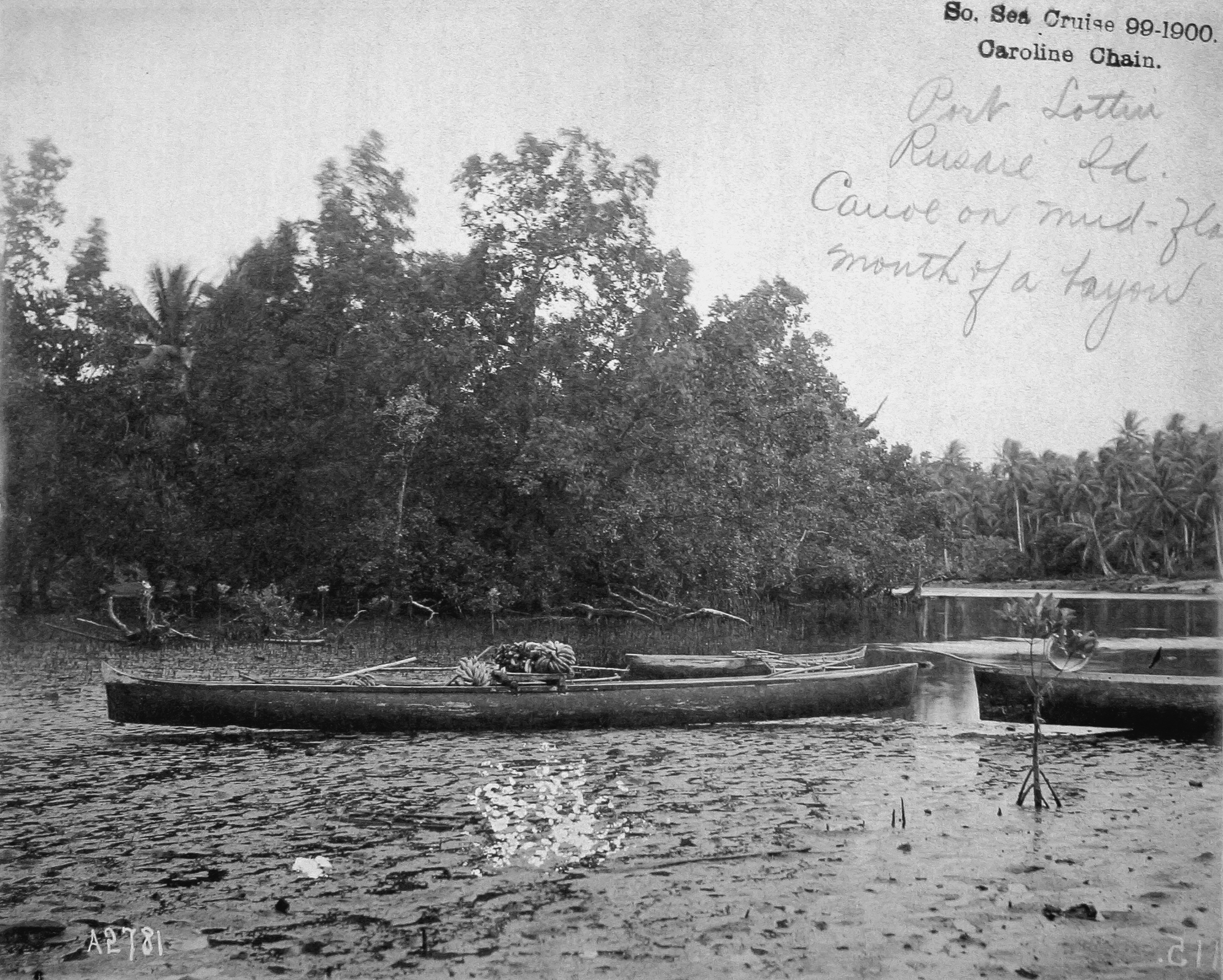
Wa at rest on mangrove mud flat, Kusaie Island, 1899–1900

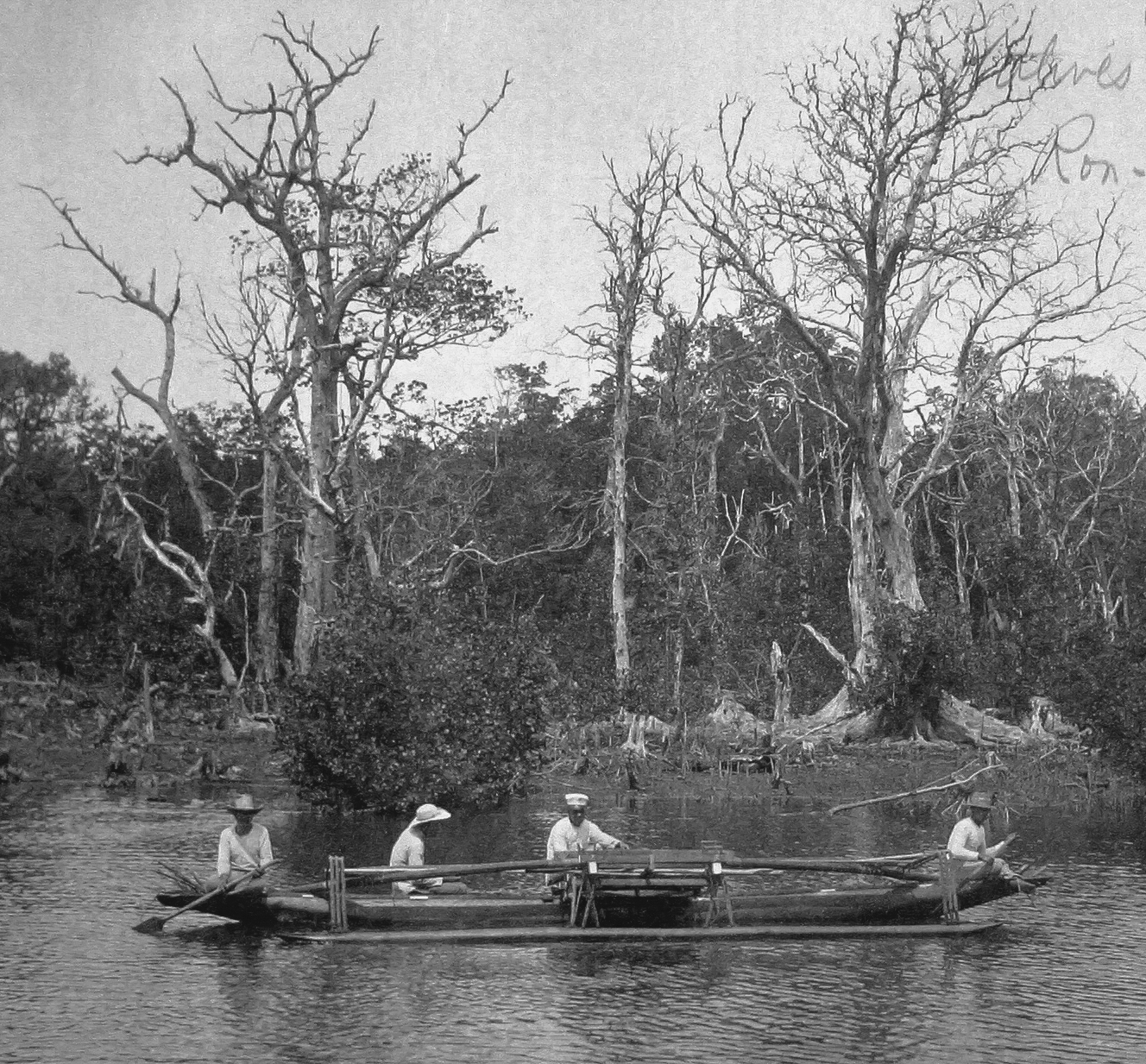
Wa on the Kiti River, Ponape, 1899–1900. Note distribution of passengers.

== Surviving models ==
A scale model Poluwat wa collected by David Lewis and Barry Lewis, father and son, in 1969 is held by the Australian National Maritime Museum at Darling Harbour, Sydney, Australia. (Note: An aggregation of scale model canoes at the museum including the following: a Poluwat wa – Caroline Islands; Kapingamarangi canoe – Federated States of Micronesia; Te Puke – Solomon Islands; Kiribati – Nikunau; and Ninigo – Papua New Guinea. A fifth model collected in 1976 is a Hawaiian canoe. These all were collected by David Lewis and Barry Lewis, father and son, incidental to research of Indigenous navigation practices and ocean voyaging, which sought understanding of long traverses of parts of across the Pacific Ocean, the so-called Polynesian navigation, without the aid of modern navigational tools.) A further, damaged, small scale model is also in Sydney at the Powerhouse Museum. As of May 2026 it is currently on display at the Powerhouse Museum Castle Hill.

Two additional models of wa craft from Yap, made before 1909, are held at the Ethnological Museum of Berlin in Germany.

== See also ==
- Austronesia
- catamaran
- David Henry Lewis
- Fanuankuwel
- Hipour
- Kafeŕoor
- Marshall Islands stick chart
- Mau Piailug
- outrigger canoe
- Polynesian navigation
- proa
- Weriyeng
