= Namonabetiu =

Atoll group in the Federated States of Micronesia

Coordinates: 7.249°N 149.305°E

Namonabetiu is the name for a group of atolls within the Federated States of Micronesia; it comprises Puluwat, Pulap, Tamatam, and Pulusuk.
