= Fanuankuwel =

Fanuankuwel is a "place of a whale with two tails" location in Pacific and Polynesian mythology, recorded in the traditional celestial navigation techniques of the Caroline Islands. Part of the Trigger fishes tied together mnemonic-navigational system, it is sometimes grouped with Kafeŕoor as a 'ghost island'.

== See also ==
- Celestial navigation
- Kafeŕoor
- Polynesian mythology
- Polynesian navigation
- Micronesian navigation
- Wa (watercraft)
