= Weriyeng =

Micronesian traditional navigation school

Weriyeng (also spelled "Warieng") is one of the last two schools of traditional navigation found in the central Caroline Islands in Micronesia, the other being Fanur. By tradition these two schools were considered to be the most high of all the schools of navigation that once dotted the islands of the central Carolines. By tradition the Weriyeng school was founded on the island of Pulap, which is today in the Pattiw region of Chuuk State, Federated States of Micronesia.

Mau Piailug is one of the most famous navigators of this school. He trained the well-known modern Hawaiian wayfinder Nainoa Thompson.

== Palu (master navigator) in this school ==
- Mau Piailug
- Rapwi
- Hipour
