= Mau Piailug =

Micronesian navigator (1932–2010)

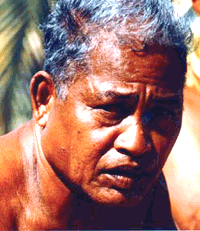
- Born: Pius Piailug; 1932; Weiso, Satawal, Yap, South Seas Mandate, Japan
- Died: 12 July 2010 (aged 78); Satawal, Yap, Federated States of Micronesia
- Other names: Mau, Papa Mau
- Education: Weriyeng school of navigation
- Occupations: Navigator; canoe builder; teacher (kumu)
- Years active: 1948–2007
- Known for: Wayfinding, Polynesian navigation, Hawaiian Renaissance
- Spouse: Nemwaeito (alt. sp. Nemoito)
- Children: 16
- Father: Orranipui
- Relatives: Urupoa (brother)
- Awards: Special fellowship, East–West Center (1976); Honorary Doctor of Humane Letters, UH (1987); Robert J. Pfeiffer Medal (2008)

Pius "Mau" Piailug (pronounced /ˈpaɪəs ˈmaʊ piːˈaɪləɡ/; 1932 – 12 July 2010) was a Micronesian navigator from Satawal in the outer islands of Yap, best known as a teacher of traditional, non-instrument wayfinding methods for open-ocean voyaging. Mau's Carolinian navigation system, which relies on navigational clues using the Sun and stars, winds and clouds, seas and swells, and birds and fish, was acquired through rote learning passed down through teachings in the oral tradition. He earned the title of master navigator (palu) by the age of eighteen, around the time the first American missionaries arrived in Satawal. As he neared middle age, Mau grew concerned that the practice of navigation in Satawal would disappear as his people became acculturated to Western values. In the hope that the navigational tradition would be preserved for future generations, Mau shared his knowledge with the Polynesian Voyaging Society (PVS). With Mau's help, PVS used experimental archaeology to recreate and test lost Hawaiian navigational techniques on the Hōkūleʻa, a modern reconstruction of a double-hulled Hawaiian voyaging canoe.

The successful, non-instrument sailing of Hōkūleʻa to Tahiti in 1976 proved the efficacy of Mau's navigational system to the world. To academia, Mau's achievement provided evidence for intentional two-way voyaging throughout Oceania, supporting a hypothesis that explained the Asiatic origin of Polynesians. The success of the Micronesian-Polynesian cultural exchange, symbolized by Hōkūleʻa, had an impact throughout the Pacific. It contributed to the emergence of the second Hawaiian cultural renaissance and to a revival of Polynesian navigation and canoe building in Hawaii, New Zealand, Rarotonga and Tahiti. It also sparked interest in traditional wayfinding on Mau's home island of Satawal. Later in life, Mau was respectfully known as a grandmaster navigator, and he was called "Papa Mau" by his friends with great reverence and affection. He received an honorary degree from the University of Hawaii, and he was honored by the Smithsonian Institution and the Bishop Museum for his contributions to maritime history. Mau's life and work was explored in several books and documentary films, and his legacy continues to be remembered and celebrated by the indigenous peoples of Oceania.

== Early life (1932–1974) ==
=== Satawal, Micronesia ===
Mau was born Pius Piailug in 1932 in the village of Weiso, on the small coral island of Satawal, in Yap State of the Caroline Islands, now a part of the Federated States of Micronesia. Satawal is a wooded island with an area of 1.3 square kilometres (0.50 sq mi), located in the western Pacific Ocean about 800 kilometres (500 mi) south of Guam. Mau's personal connection to the sea began early in his life, when he was placed in tide pools in his infancy so he could feel the pull of the ocean. At the age of four or five, Mau was chosen by his grandfather Raangipi to study as an apprentice navigator. Mau initially protested his grandfather's teaching, preferring to spend his time playing on the beach with children his own age. Raangipi trained Mau as a young navigator for many years. Their day would begin at sunrise, when they would eat breakfast together and afterwards, take care of chores before they went fishing. During the evening, Mau would join the men in the canoe house as they drank, listening to their stories about navigation and sailing. Raangipi told the young boy that if he chose to become a navigator, Mau could gain respect from his community, eat well, and maintain a position in Satawalese society higher than that of a chief. Encouraged, Mau learned basic navigational clues regarding the "stars, swells, and birds" from Raangipi, but his grandfather died sometime before Mau was fourteen.

After his grandfather died, Mau began training with his father, Orranipui. Mau learned more about navigating by stars (wofanu) from his father, and how to fish and build canoes. When his father died before he turned fifteen, Mau was adopted by his aunt and uncle. Sometime around the age of eighteen, Mau's aunt and uncle sent him to study with Angora, an acclaimed navigator. His studies culminated in his initiation as a master navigator (palu) in the Weriyeng school of navigation during the revered pwo ceremony presided over by Angora. It was to be the last pwo held on Satawal for the next fifty years. After the ceremony, Mau lived for a month in the canoe house where he received rigorous lessons from three navigators. When the final training was complete, Mau made his first solo voyage of about 92 kilometres (57 mi). Because he had a tendency to sail in all weather conditions, he was given the nickname "Mau", from the Satawalese word maumau, meaning "strong". After becoming a navigator, Mau married Nemwaeito with whom he raised ten boys and six girls.

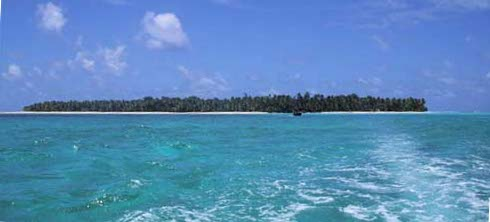
"Mau Piailug is from the island of Satawal. It's a mile and a half long and a mile wide. Population 600. Navigation's not about cultural revival, it's about survival. Not enough food can be produced on a small island like that. Their navigators have to go out to sea to catch fish so they can eat." (Nainoa Thompson)

Daily life in Mau's village on Satawal involved harvesting taro and gathering breadfruit and coconut. The Satawalese people also raised chicken and pork and caught fish, their primary source of protein. A freshwater pond served as bathing facilities. Local materials were used to construct outrigger canoes called proa. The island's isolation helped preserve the lifestyle of the Satawalese people and Mau's role as a navigator. Even with the arrival of the Germans (1890) and the Japanese (1914) in Micronesia, Satawalese culture remained intact. American missionaries who arrived after World War II built the first church and school on Satawal.

In the late 1960s, Mau attempted to verify his navigational knowledge of the wider Pacific by working as a seaman on an inter-island ship run by the Trust Territory of the Pacific Islands. From 1969 to 1973, Mau became friends with Mike McCoy, a Peace Corps volunteer stationed on Satawal. As well as marrying Mau's niece, McCoy sailed with Mau and they worked together on a project tagging turtles. McCoy became interested in Satawalese navigation, published several articles on the topic and kept in touch with the anthropologist Ben Finney, who was researching Polynesian navigation. When McCoy's assignment on Satawal ended, he asked Pialug if he wanted to come to Hawaii with him.

=== Honolulu, Hawaii ===
Mau first visited Hawaii in 1973, and McCoy introduced him to Ben Finney. Later, Finney suggested to the Polynesian Voyaging Society that they should try to recruit Mau for their Hōkūleʻa project, since no Hawaiian traditional navigators remained. The project goal was to test the hypothesis that Polynesians made intentional non-instrument voyages across the Pacific. Tevake, a renowned Polynesian navigator, had died in 1970 and only six others were known. Navigators were reluctant to release their sacred knowledge to "outsiders". At the time, Mau was just 41 years old and the youngest navigator out of the group. Mau feared that traditional navigation would die in his own culture, just as it had in Hawaii. He had tried to teach the young men of Satawal the skills passed on to him, but he was not optimistic. The members of the younger generation were too busy with school and too attracted to Western culture to undertake the rigorous course of study and apprenticeship. Further, Mau's people did not seem to care that traditional navigation was dying and could be lost forever.

== Later life (1975–2010) ==
=== Hōkūleʻa ===
With Finney's help, Mau was awarded a special fellowship at the East–West Center. Mau returned to Honolulu in April 1975 to begin work with the Hawaii-based Polynesian Voyaging Society, eventually navigating the double-hulled canoe Hōkūleʻa from Hawaii to Tahiti on its maiden voyage in 1976. Mau trained and mentored Native Hawaiian navigator Nainoa Thompson, who would later become a master navigator. David Henry Lewis, a scholar of Polynesian navigation, documented Mau's work.

Mau Piailug's Voyages on Hōkūleʻa Hōkūleʻa
Year	Voyage	Ports
1976	Inaugural Voyage	Hawaii–Tahiti
1980	Tahiti Voyage	Hawaii–Tahiti–Hawaii
1985– 1987	Voyage of Rediscovery	Hawaii–Tahiti–Rarotonga; Waitangi–Nukuʻalofa–Pago Pago–Tutuila–Aitutaki–Rarotonga–Tautira
1995	Nā ʻOhana Holo Moana	Hilo–Papeʻete; Nuku Hiva–Hilo

Mau's first-hand knowledge of traditional navigation had been accumulated in Northern Hemisphere study and sailings, but the voyage to Tahiti required Mau to familiarise himself with the geography and night sky of the Southern Hemisphere. Of the preparation, Finney writes,

To prepare Mau Piailug for the voyage, David Lewis briefed him on the geography of the islands in this part of the Pacific and the winds and currents that could be expected along the way, all information that an early Polynesian navigator acquainted with this route would have carried in his head. In addition, to alert Mau of how the elevation of stars above the northern and southern horizons would change as the canoe sailed farther and farther south, we held training sessions in Honolulu's Bishop Museum planetarium to graphically show how, for example, as one sailed toward Tahiti[,] Polaris sank lower and lower on the northern horizon until it disappeared at the equator while the Southern Cross curved higher and higher in the sky. During his first few days of the voyage, Mau received further coaching on the pattern of winds and currents from Rodo Williams, a veteran Tahitian seaman on the crew who the year before had sailed a yacht from Tahiti to Hawaii and could therefore provide Mau with a firsthand account of what he could expect to encounter.

Their collaboration proved successful when, on the 31st day at sea on the 1976 voyage, Mau stated soon they would see land, and the next day, Tahiti. A few hours later, they spotted land-based white terns (Gygis alba) followed by a diminution of the trade-wind swell. That night, they spotted Mataiva. After a brief stopover, with little more than another day's sailing they made landfall at Tahiti where they were welcomed by 17,000 people, half the population of Tahiti.

Nainoa's ambition was to sail Hōkūleʻa to Tahiti as navigator by using recreated traditional techniques. He spent years training on his own and with Mau. Mau's training and mentoring helped Nainoa achieve that goal in the 1980 Tahiti voyage. It marked the first time in over 500 years that a Native Hawaiian had mastered the stars, the seas, the birds, and the winds to guide a sailing canoe from Hawaii to Tahiti and back. The two men joined again for the 1985–1987 Voyage of Rediscovery to New Zealand, again with Nainoa as principal navigator and Mau as mentor. The voyage to New Zealand stoked Māori interest in cultural history, navigation techniques, and canoe building. It also brought to life for Māori the stories in their folklore of the great canoe voyages of migration and settlement in Aotearoa (New Zealand). Describing a ceremony held at Waitangi to commemorate the Hawaii New Zealand voyage of Hōkūleʻa, Nainoa writes:

Sir James Hēnare, the most revered of the elders of Tai Tokerau, got up and said, "You've proven that it could be done. And you've also proven that our ancestors did it.... because the five tribes of Tai Tokerau trace their ancestry from the names of the canoes they arrived in, and because you people from Hawaiʻi came by canoe, therefore by our traditions, you must be the sixth tribe of Tai Tokerau.

In 1995, Mau took part in the Nā ʻOhana Holo Moana voyage of Hōkūleʻa to Raiatea. Sailing with his son Sesario Sewralur, and Nainoa as sailing master, Mau watched as Nainoa's students Kaʻau McKenney and Keahi Omai served as navigators. Mau had seen Nainoa succeed in the 1980 and 1985–1987 voyages; finally, in this 1995 voyage, Mau saw proof that the knowledge was carried forward to the next generation. The canoe landed successfully at Rarotonga, and the voyage resulted in the lifting of a six-centuries-old taboo on voyaging from Raʻiātea. Hōkūleʻa had sailed from Hawaii with sisterships Hawaiʻiloa and Makaliʻi; the canoes rendez-voused at Taputapuatea with other voyaging canoes from across Oceania.

=== Makaliʻi ===
To help preserve Hawaiian culture, Milton "Shorty" Bertelmann and his brother Clay established the nonprofit organization, Nā Kalai Waʻa Moku o Hawaiʻi on the island of Hawaii in 1992. Beginning in 1994, the two brothers helped construct Makaliʻi, a 54-foot voyaging canoe, launching it in 1995. From February to May 1999, "Shorty" Bertelmann navigated Makaliʻi to Satawal in a voyage known as "E Mau – Sailing the Master Home". The voyage was to pay homage to master navigator Mau Piailug and to thank him for his teachings. Mau sailed home aboard Makaliʻi as their honored guest. Makaliʻi continued her 1999 voyage through half the length of Micronesia. She was the first Hawaiian voyaging canoe to visit the far reaches of Micronesia and her appearance stimulated interest in Micronesians in their own cultural history.

=== Alingano Maisu ===
On 18 March 2007 Mau presided over the first pwo ceremony for navigators in 56 years on the island of Satawal. Five Native Hawaiians and eleven other people were inducted into pwo as master navigators, including Nainoa Thompson and Mau's son, Sesario Sewralur. The Polynesian Voyaging Society, as part of the 2007 Hōkūleʻa "One Ocean, One People" voyage named "Kū Holo Mau", presented Mau with a canoe named the Alingano Maisu, a gift for his key role in reviving traditional wayfinding navigation in Hawaii. The canoe was built in Kawaihae, Hawaii under the nonprofit organization Nā Kalai Waʻa Moku O Hawaiʻi. The commitment to build this "gift" for Mau was made by Clay Bertelmann, captain of Makaliʻi and Hōkūleʻa. Maisu was given to Mau on behalf of all the voyaging families and organizations that actively continue to sail and practice the traditions taught by Mau Piailug.

=== Death ===
After a long struggle with diabetes, Mau died on his home island of Satawal at 18:30 Micronesia time, Monday, 12 July 2010. As is the tradition on Satawal, travel between the islands was temporarily suspended in Mau's honour. Because there is no morgue on the island, Mau was buried the following day, and a nightly rosary was held until the memorial service on 21 July at Santa Soledad Church. Mau's son Henry Yarofalpiy continued teaching students about their culture, preserving the legacy of his father.

== Awards ==
Mau was awarded an honorary Doctor of Humane Letters in 1987 by the University of Hawaii.

On 9 May 2000, he was honoured by the Smithsonian Institution at the National Museum of Natural History. At the ceremony, secretary Lawrence M. Small said, "The rebirth of non-instrument navigation came about largely due to this man, Mau Piailug".

The Bishop Museum presented Mau with the Robert J. Pfeiffer Medal on 12 July 2008, honouring him for "exceptional dedication to the advancement of maritime affairs and the perpetuation of maritime heritage in Hawaii and the Pacific". Mau also was honored for his "devotion and outstanding civic leadership" and for exemplifying "the spirit and purpose of the Museum's founder Charles Reed Bishop".

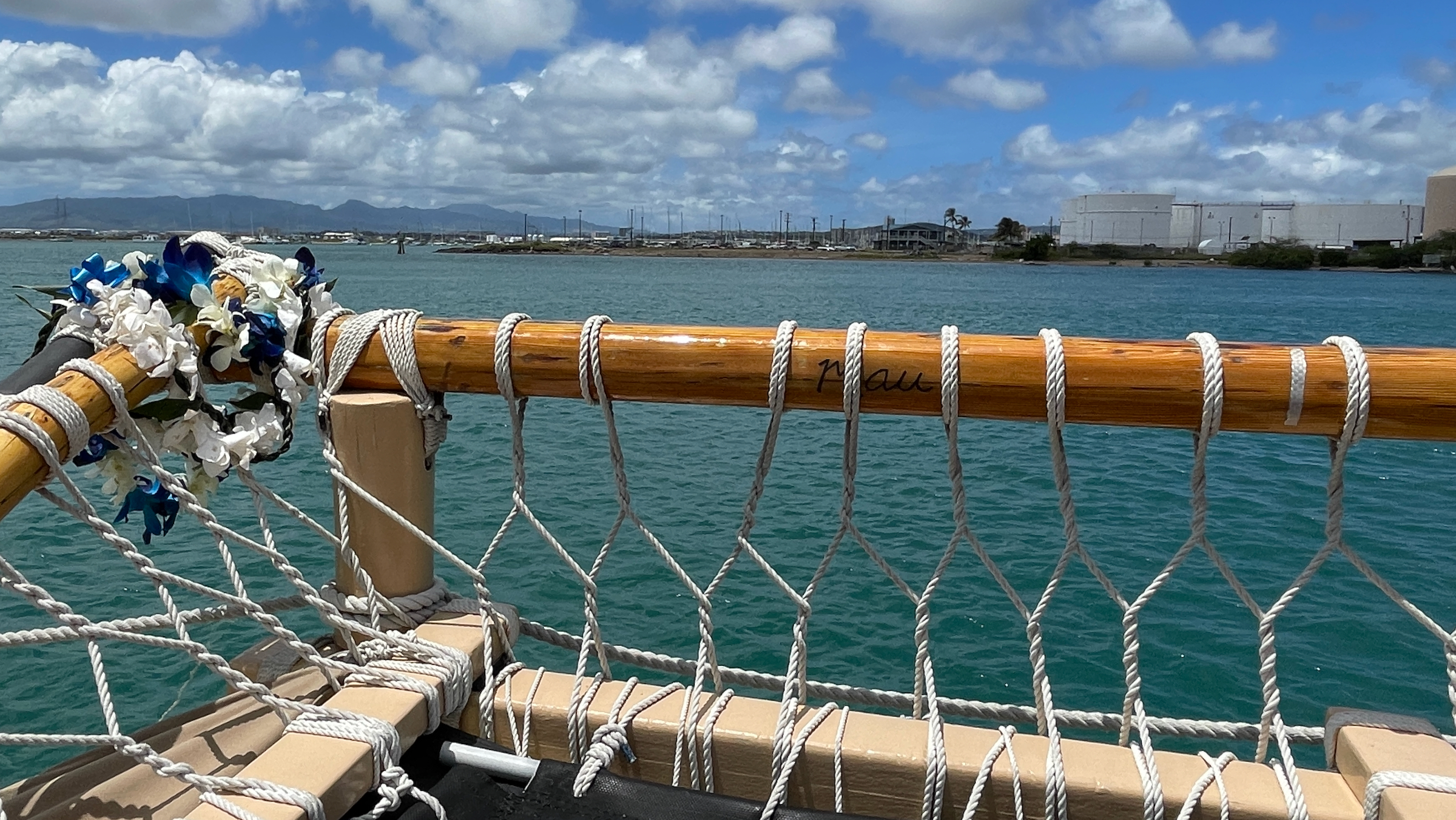
Mau's name carved into the back of the navigator's seat aboard Hokule'a

The Polynesian Voyaging Society recognized Mau's contributions in preserving the art of wayfinding by building and donating the voyaging canoe Alingano Maisu to Mau and the people of Satawal, and he is honored with his name carved into the rail aboard Hōkūleʻa behind his traditional seat on the port rear quarter of the vessel.

== Legacy ==
The success of Mau's navigational feats sparked cultural pride in Tahitians, Māori, and Hawaiians and connected all Polynesians to stories their forebears told of similar voyages of generations past. The voyage of Hōkūleʻa attracted the interest of young students such as Milton "Shorty" Bertelmann and later Nainoa Thompson. Mau not only led Hōkūleʻa to Tahiti, but reconnected the people of the Pacific to their cultural roots. Revived interest in preserving traditional culture and navigation methods reinvigorated the art of canoe building and cultural studies in Hawaii, New Zealand, Rarotonga, and Tahiti, as well as Mau's homeland of Satawal.

A projection of the Polynesian triangle on the globe. Taiwan is circled in the upper left corner.

Two centuries before Mau and the Hōkūleʻa, Captain James Cook, with the help of Tupaia, gained knowledge that otherwise would have been closely held. Before his death in 1779, Cook hypothesized that Polynesians shared common ancestry; he even pinned their origin to Asia. However, Cook's theory did not prevent debate among scholars. Before the Hōkūleʻa voyage in 1976, academic debate about the settlement of Polynesia was divided between several schools of thought.

Norwegian ethnographer Thor Heyerdahl hypothesized that the Pacific was settled by voyages from South America and set out to prove that with his Kon-Tiki expedition. Scholars did not take Heyerdahl's hypothesis seriously. New Zealander Andrew Sharp proposed the accidental voyaging hypothesis in 1957, which (erroneously) argued that Oceania was too vast to have been settled by intentional voyaging so migrations must have happened by accidental drift voyages. Sharp granted that Polynesians likely settled the Pacific from Asia, but held the opinion that their crude vessels and navigational tools were not reliable for intentional sailing from Tahiti to Hawaii or New Zealand. He stated that voyages of more than 300 miles were likely accidental voyages, with landfall at the mercy of wind and current. A 1973 study and computer simulation by Levison, Ward, and Web investigated the probability of Sharp's hypothesis but found it improbable.

Finney disagreed with the accidental voyaging portion of Sharp's hypothesis. To investigate the problem, he founded the Polynesian Voyaging Society with Herb Kane and Tommy Holmes in 1973, intent on building a voyaging canoe to sail from Hawaii to Tahiti to test whether intentional two-way voyaging throughout Oceania could be replicated. With the help of Mau's navigational knowledge guiding Hōkūleʻa, the Polynesian Voyaging Society demonstrated that intentional voyaging was not only possible, but also the ancestors of the Polynesians could have settled the Pacific on similar voyages using non-instrument wayfinding techniques such as Mau's. Finally, linguistic and archaeological evidence suggests that the history of the Polynesian people does not originate in the East Pacific but in the West. Recent developments in the field of DNA analysis have unequivocally settled the debate of Polynesian origin. They prove Polynesians share common ancestry with indigenous Taiwanese and East Asians.

== Wayfinding and navigation ==
=== Training ===
Navigator training was historically interwoven with culture and ritual. Great discretion had to be shown in candidate selection so that the knowledge preserved through oral tradition would have the greatest chance of survival. A master navigator's rank was equal or superior to a village chief's rank. Prudent navigation relies on no single technique but instead synthesizes position from multiple inputs. Underway, this constant synthesis makes it easy to spot the navigator, he being the one with red eyes from sleep deprivation.

Mau Piailug's Star Compass
A recreation of Mau Piailug's star compass
Legend
Satawalese name	Traditional name	Astronomical name
Tupul	Setting	West
Tan	Rising	East
Wuliwulifasmughet	North star	Polaris
Mailapailefung	Little Dipper	Ursa Minor
Wylur	Big Dipper	Ursa Major
Igulig ("Whale")	1) Cassiopeia (head of whale); 2a) Almach & 2b) Mirach (body of whale); 3a) Hamal & 3b) Sharatan (whale's tail)	1) Cassiopeia; 2a) Gamma Andromedae & 2b) Beta Andromedae; 3a) Alpha Arietis & 3b) Beta Arietis
Murn	Vega	Vega
Marigaht	Seven Sisters	Pleiades
Uul	Aldebaran	Alpha Tauri
Paiifung	Tarazed	Gamma Aquilae
Mailap	Altair	Alpha Aquilae
Paiyur	Alshain	Beta Aquilae
Earlier	Orion	Orion
Sarapool	Corvus	Corvus
Tumur	Scorpius (Top 6 stars)	Scorpius
Mesario	1a) Shaula & 1b) Antares	1a) Lambda Scorpii & 1b) Alpha Scorpii
Luubw	Southern Cross (rising or setting)	Crux
Machemeias	Southern Cross (at 45° over SE horizon)	Crux
Wuliwuliluubw	Southern Cross (upright)	Crux
Machemelito	Southern Cross (at 45° over SW horizon)	Crux

For a traditionally trained navigator, these inputs include physical signals from the sea, skies, and stars, memory signals from his knowledge of star, swell, and wind compasses; and cultural knowledge recorded in chants, dances, and stories. Examples of physical signals include the color, temperature, and taste (salinity) of seawater; floating plant debris; sightings of land-based seabirds flying out to fish; cloud type, color, and movement; wind direction, speed, and temperature; the direction and nature of ocean swells and waves; the position of stars in the sky, and his estimation of the speed, current set, and leeway of his sailing craft. The "compass" he carried was not magnetic but a mental model of where islands are located and the star points that one could use to navigate between them. This mental model would have taken years of study to build; dances, chants (rong), and stories helped him to recall complex relationships of geography and location. The stars gave him highly reliable position information when visible, but navigators such as Mau manage to keep their position and tracks in mind even when blocked by clouds, using other references such as wind and swell as proxies.

Mau's Carolinian star compass (pictured) is the basis for Nainoa's modern Hawaiian star compass. Apart from the bulk of training, which happens at sea, historically boys were taught in the men's house with pebbles, shells, or pieces of coral, representing stars, laid on the sand in a circular pattern. The bits of shell or coral that are chosen to represent which star or constellation is arbitrary, but generally, larger pieces are used for points of the compass while smaller pieces represent important stars between those points. In Mau's star compass, these points are not necessarily equidistant. The outer circular formation represents the horizon, with the canoe its center point. The eastern half of the circle depicts reference stars' rising points on the horizon (tan) while the western half depicts their setting points (tupul). Swell patterns of prevailing trade winds are represented by sticks (not depicted here) overlaying the star compass in the form of a square. All knowledge is retained by memory with the help of dances, chants, and stories, wherein the stars are enumerated as people or characters in the stories.

=== Technique ===
One aspect of the Carolinian method of estimating longitude on inter-island sailings is to visualize the target island relative to a second reference island's alignment with a succession of selected stars, points of the star compass. It is a refined system of dead reckoning whereby the navigator constantly synthesizes his position relative to the reference island's location in his mental model. The most remarkable thing is that the reference island (lu pongank) may be over the horizon, unseen, even imaginary.

In its simplest form the star compass describes 32 points at which key stars rise on the eastern horizon and set on the western horizon. North latitude is fairly easy to determine because the North Pole has a zenith star easily seen with the naked eye, called Polaris (Wuliwulifasmughet). Polaris' height above the horizon indicates the viewer's southward displacement from Polaris' nadir, the North Pole. When one travels further north, Polaris appears higher in the sky. Only at the true north pole is Polaris directly overhead at nearly 90 degrees altitude. When one travels south toward the equator, Polaris appears to descend toward the northern horizon. At 45 degrees north latitude, Polaris is 45 degrees above the northern horizon. Near the equator, Polaris' altitude approaches zero degrees, but for the viewer just further south, Polaris will have disappeared below the northern horizon.

Continuing south from the equator, though Polaris is no longer visible, Crux (Luubw), the "Southern Cross", will have risen above the southern horizon. Travelling further southward, Crux rises higher in the sky. Through Crux's longest axis, an imaginary line bisecting Gacrux and Acrux points southward toward the southern celestial pole. However, the South Pole has no true zenith star from which direct readings of south latitude may be taken. As a proxy, the southern celestial pole lies at the end of that imaginary line extended southward through Gacrux and Acrux, at a distance about 4.5 times the distance between them. Nainoa Thompson notes that at Hawaiʻi's latitude, the distance between Gacrux and the southerly Acrux is equal to Acrux's altitude above the southern horizon.

To steer the canoe in mid-ocean on a consistent course, the navigator selects a star and keeps the canoe pointed toward it. Should it become cloud-blocked, or rise too high in the sky, he selects another star but offsets his reference to remain true to the first, or steers at the same relative angle to the swell as when steering toward the star.
