= Poluwat =

Coral atoll in the Federal States of Micronesia

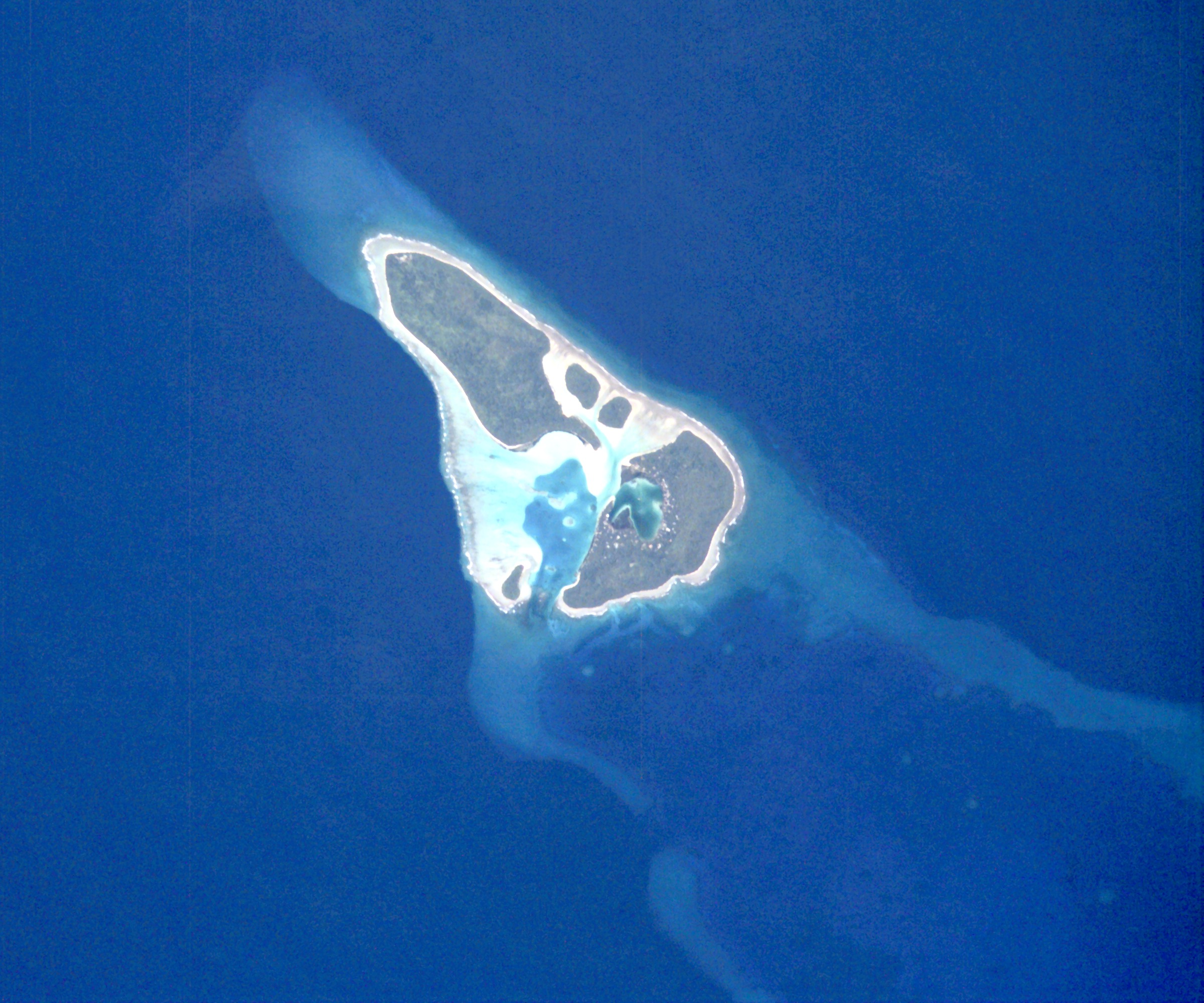
NASA picture of Poluwat Atoll.

Location of Polowat in Chuuk State, Federated States of Micronesia

Poluwat, also Polowat, formerly Puluwat, is a coral atoll and a municipality of Chuuk state, Federated States of Micronesia.

== Name ==
The name of the island goes back to Proto-Chuukic *pʷolowado.

== Geography ==
Polowat is located in the northwestern region (Oksoritod), and there in the western area (Pattiw) of Chuuk state. The location is 07°21′26″N 149°12′01″E. The atoll has five islets (including itself) lying on the rim of the reef, with an aggregate land area of 3.4 km^{2}, listed counterclockwise starting at Polowat in the southeast:

1. Polowat (east)
2. Alengelap (north rim)
3. To (north rim)
4. Alei (west)
5. Haw (south)

Since Polowat Atoll has only a small lagoon, in comparison with most Micronesian atolls, the total size is only 7 km^{2}. Alei in the west and Polowat in the east, the two largest islands of the atoll, have breadfruit trees at the middle and coconut palms along the shores. Along the northern rim of the reef, between Polowat and Alei, are Alengelap Islet and To Islet. The southern corner of the atoll is marked by Haw Islet, with 0.02 km^{2} the smallest. These smaller islets are rocky and wooded, but have few coconut palms.

Polowat Atoll and specifically Alei Island are the westernmost land features of Chuuk state.

There are three villages on the west side of Polowat Island, facing the lagoon, with a total population of 1,015 (census of 2000), from north to south:

1. Relong
2. Lukaf
3. Rewow

Uranie Bank, which extends about 26 km southeast from Polowat, has depths of 11 to 61 meters. Together with Polowat Atoll, it might be considered part of a larger, mostly submerged atoll structure, with a total size of 332 km^{2}.

Enderby Bank, with a depth of 16 meters, coral, lies about 5 km west-northwest of Alei Island.

== Climate ==
Polowat Atoll, Chuuk, Federated States of Micronesia elevation 7 feet (2.1 m)

Climate chart (precipitation, max. and min. temperature)
J	F	M	A	M	J	J	A	S	O	N	D
7.7 89 74	5.4 90 74	5.7 90 74	8.8 90 74	10 90 74	11 90 73	11 90 73	9.4 90 73	8.8 90 73	9.4 90 73	7.5 90 74	6.6 90 74
- █ Average max. and min. temperatures in °F
- █ Precipitation totals in inches
- Source: 1981–2010 provisional normals
Metric conversion
J	F	M	A	M	J	J	A	S	O	N	D
195 32 23	137 32 23	146 32 23	223 32 23	258 32 23	275 32 23	267 32 23	238 32 23	224 32 23	238 32 23	189 32 23	167 32 23
- █ Average max. and min. temperatures in °C
- █ Precipitation totals in mm

== History ==
It was discovered by Spanish naval officer Juan Antonio de Ibargoitia commanding the vessel Filipino on 7 April 1801.

The Japanese garrison during World War II was composed of 2,769 IJA men of the 11th Independent Mixed Regiment under the command of Colonel Tatsuo Yasui and 243 IJN men. Due to a food shortage 2 of the 3 army battalions were moved to Truk but still, 335 IJA soldiers and 211 IJN soldiers on the island died of hunger and illness. Japanese defense bunkers from the years leading up to World War II and a white concrete lighthouse tower, 40 meters high, stand on the northwest end of Alei. There are also many Japanese relics from World War II on Alei, including a beached ship that was attacked by American aircraft. At the bottom of the larger lagoon lies an American plane, also from World War II. The Japanese Lighthouse, is listed on the U.S. National Register of Historic Places.

== Communications ==
There is a radio station on Polowat.

== See also ==
- Puluwat language or Puluwatese
