= Outline of the Federated States of Micronesia =

Overview of and topical guide to the Federated States of Micronesia

The Flag of the Federated States of Micronesia

The Seal of the Federated States of Micronesia

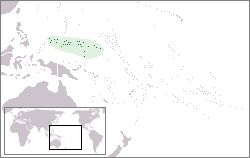
The location of the Federated States of Micronesia

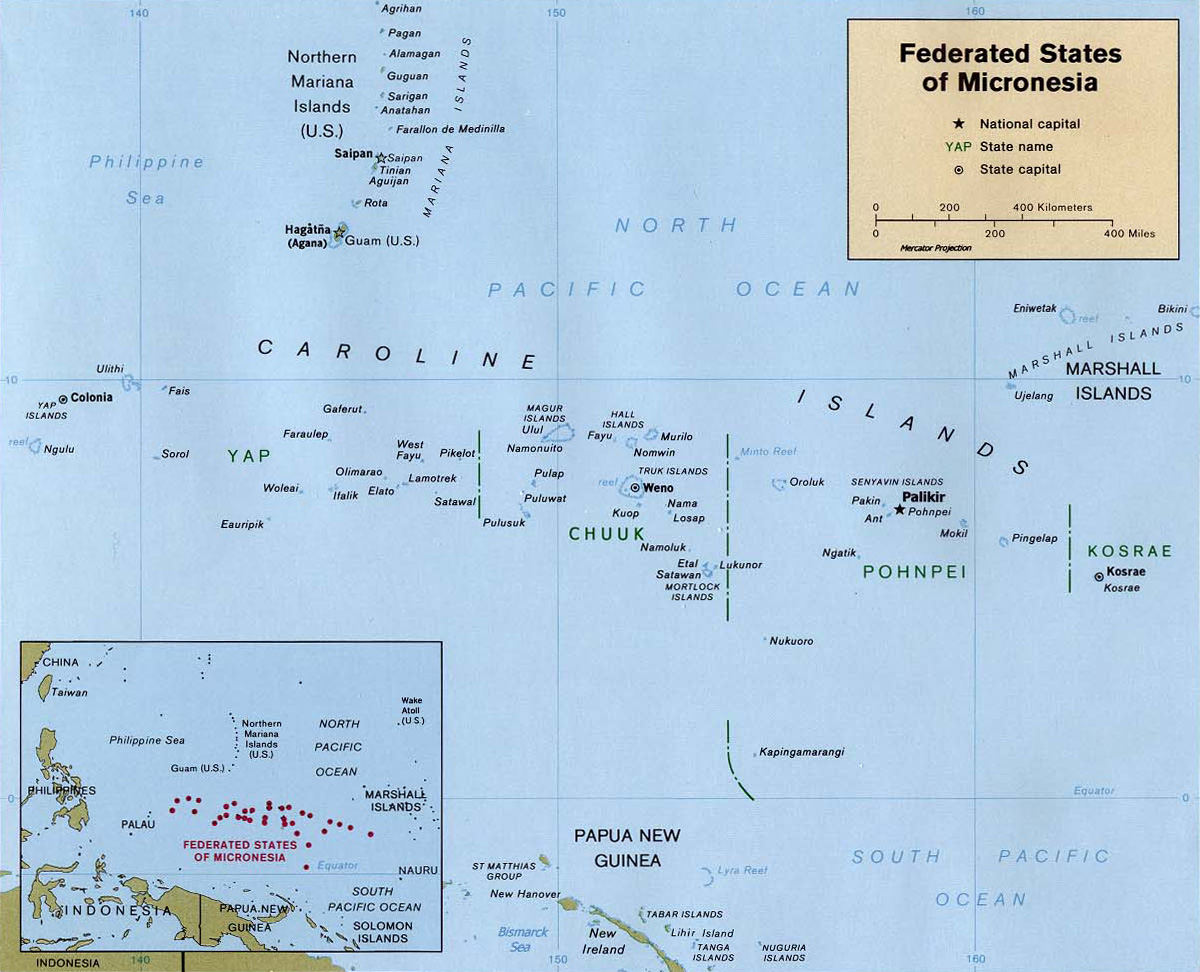
An enlargeable map of the Federated States of Micronesia

The following outline is provided as an overview of and topical guide to Micronesia:

The Federated States of Micronesia – island nation located in the North Pacific Ocean, north of Papua New Guinea. The country is a sovereign state in free association with the United States. The Federated States of Micronesia were formerly part of the Trust Territory of the Pacific Islands, a United Nations Trust Territory under US administration. In 1979 they adopted a constitution, and in 1986 independence was attained under a Compact of Free Association with the United States. Present concerns include large-scale unemployment, overfishing, and dependence on U.S. aid. The Federated States of Micronesia are located in the region known as Micronesia, which consists of hundreds of small islands divided in seven territories. The term Micronesia may refer to the Federated States or to the region as a whole, even though the lack of a central government makes it a sovereign group of states, not a country.

== General reference ==
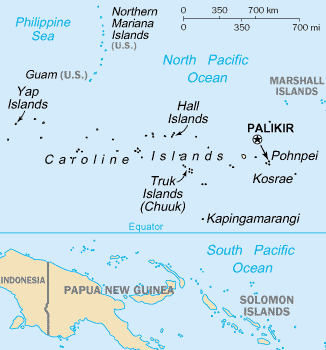
An enlargeable basic map of the Federated States of Micronesia

- Pronunciation: /maɪkrəˈniːʒə, -kroʊ-, -ˈniːʃə, -ˈniːziə/ (Note: "Micronesia". Oxford Dictionaries UK English Dictionary. Oxford University Press.)
- Common English country name: Micronesia, Federated States
- Official English country name: The Federated States of Micronesia
- Common endonym(s):
- Official endonym(s):
- Adjectival(s): Micronesian
- Demonym(s):
- Etymology: Name of Micronesia
- ISO country codes: FM, FSM, 583
- ISO region codes: See ISO 3166-2:FM
- Internet country code top-level domain: .fm

== Geography of the Federated States of Micronesia ==
Geography of the Federated States of Micronesia

- Federated States of Micronesia is: an island country
- Location:
  - Northern Hemisphere and Eastern Hemisphere
  - Pacific Ocean
    - North Pacific
      - Oceania
        - Micronesia (the region)
          - Caroline Islands
  - Time zones:
    - Time in the Federated States of Micronesia
    - Kosrae and Pohnpei – UTC+11
    - Yap and Chuuk – UTC+10
  - Extreme points of the Federated States of Micronesia
    - High: Nanlaud on Pohnpei 782 m (2,566 ft)
    - Low: North Pacific Ocean 0 m
  - Land boundaries: none
  - Coastline: North Pacific Ocean 6,112 km
- Population of the Federated States of Micronesia: 107,862 people (2007 estimate) - 181st most populous country
- Area of the Federated States of Micronesia: 702 km^{2} (271 sq mi) - 188th largest country
- Atlas of the Federated States of Micronesia

=== Environment of the Federated States of Micronesia ===
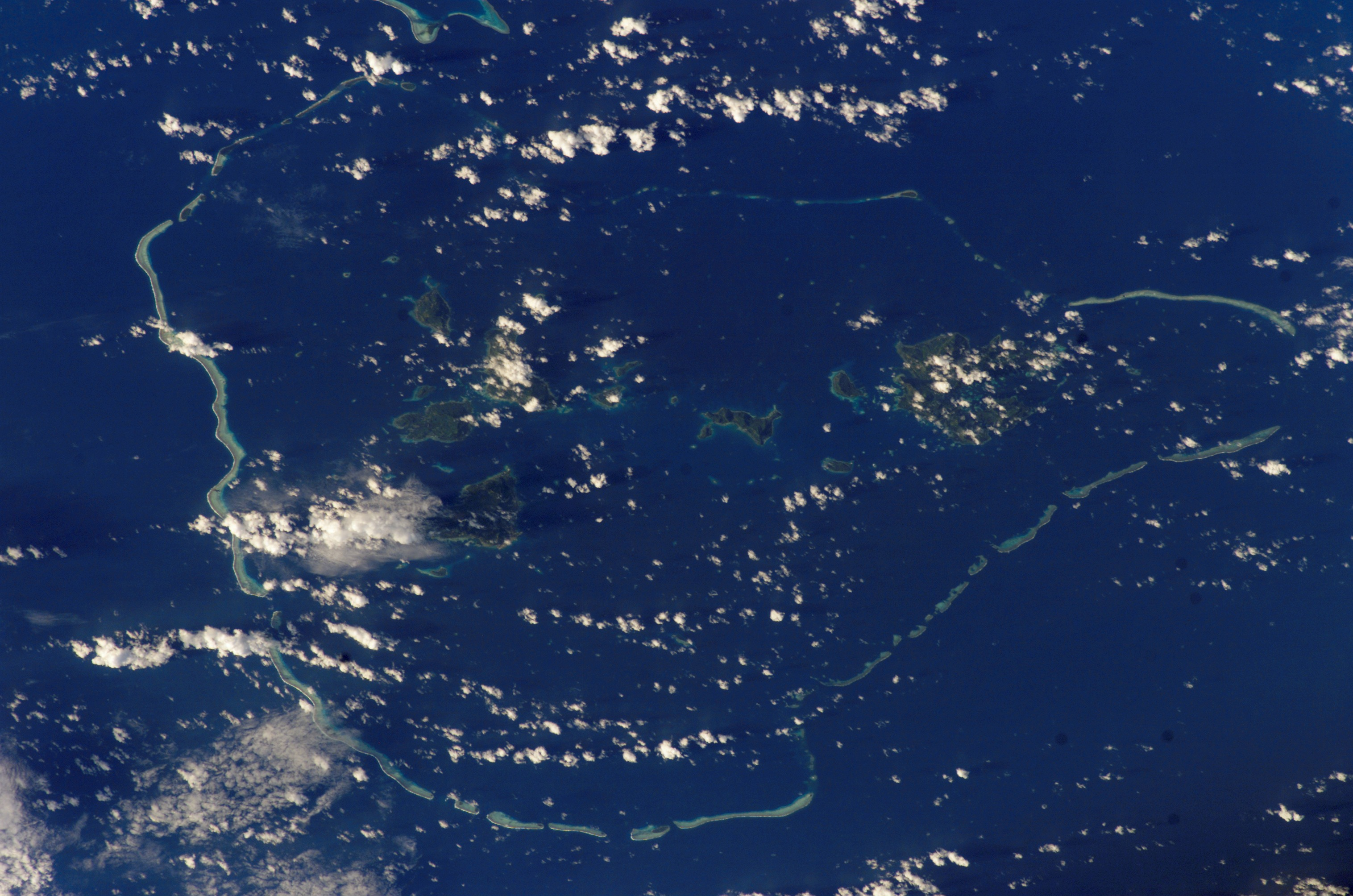
An enlargeable satellite image of the Chuuk Islands

- Climate of the Federated States of Micronesia: Tropical rainforest climate
- Renewable energy in the Federated States of Micronesia
- Geology of the Federated States of Micronesia
- Protected areas of the Federated States of Micronesia
  - Yela Ka Forest
- Wildlife of the Federated States of Micronesia
  - Fauna of the Federated States of Micronesia
    - Birds of the Federated States of Micronesia
    - Butterflies of the Federated States of Micronesia
    - Mammals of the Federated States of Micronesia

==== Natural geographic features of the Federated States of Micronesia ====
- Islands of the Federated States of Micronesia
- Lakes of the Federated States of Micronesia
- Mountains of the Federated States of Micronesia
  - Volcanoes in the Federated States of Micronesia
- Rivers of the Federated States of Micronesia
  - Waterfalls of the Federated States of Micronesia
- Valleys of the Federated States of Micronesia
- World Heritage Sites in the Federated States of Micronesia
  - Nan Madol

=== Regions and places of the Federated States of Micronesia ===
- National Register of Historic Places listings in the Federated States of Micronesia

==== Ecoregions of the Federated States of Micronesia ====
- Carolines tropical moist forests
- Yap tropical dry forests

==== Administrative divisions of the Federated States of Micronesia ====
Administrative divisions of the Federated States of Micronesia

- States of the Federated States of Micronesia
  1. Chuuk
  2. Kosrae
  3. Pohnpei
  4. Yap
- Islands of the Federated States of Micronesia
  - Fono, Federated States of Micronesia

===== Municipalities of the Federated States of Micronesia =====
- Capital of the Federated States of Micronesia: Palikir
- Cities and towns of the Federated States of Micronesia
  - Tol, Federated States of Micronesia

=== Demography of the Federated States of Micronesia ===
Demographics of the Federated States of Micronesia

== Government and politics of the Federated States of Micronesia ==
Politics of the Federated States of Micronesia

- Form of government: federal assembly-independent representative democratic republic
- Capital of the Federated States of Micronesia: Palikir
- Elections in the Federated States of Micronesia
- Political parties in the Federated States of Micronesia

=== Branches of the government of the Federated States of Micronesia ===
Government of the Federated States of Micronesia

==== Executive branch of the government of the Federated States of Micronesia ====
- Head of state: President of the Federated States of Micronesia,
  - Vice President of the Federated States of Micronesia
- Head of government: President of the Federated States of Micronesia,
  - Vice President of the Federated States of Micronesia
- Cabinet of the Federated States of Micronesia
- Department of Education (Federated States of Micronesia)
- Department of Transportation, Communications and Infrastructure (Federated States of Micronesia)

==== Legislative branch of the government of the Federated States of Micronesia ====
- Congress of the Federated States of Micronesia

==== Judicial branch of the government of the Federated States of Micronesia ====
Court system of the Federated States of Micronesia

- Supreme Court of the Federated States of Micronesia
  - Chief Justice of the Federated States of Micronesia

=== Foreign relations of the Federated States of Micronesia ===
Foreign relations of the Federated States of Micronesia

- Federated States of Micronesia and the United Nations
- Diplomatic missions in the Federated States of Micronesia
  - List of ambassadors of Australia to the Federated States of Micronesia
  - List of ambassadors of China to the Federated States of Micronesia
- Diplomatic missions of the Federated States of Micronesia
  - List of ambassadors of the Federated States of Micronesia to China
  - List of ambassadors of the Federated States of Micronesia to the United States
  - List of ambassadors of the United States to the Federated States of Micronesia
- Australia–Federated States of Micronesia relations
- China–Federated States of Micronesia relations
- India–Federated States of Micronesia relations
- Israel–Federated States of Micronesia relations
- Marshall Islands–Federated States of Micronesia relations
  - Marshall Islands–Federated States of Micronesia Maritime Boundary Treaty
- Federated States of Micronesia–Palau relations
- Federated States of Micronesia–United States relations

==== International organization membership ====
The Federated States of Micronesia is a member of:

- African, Caribbean, and Pacific Group of States (ACP)
- Asian Development Bank (ADB)
- Alliance of Small Island States (AOSIS)
- Food and Agriculture Organization (FAO)
- Group of 77 (G77)
- International Bank for Reconstruction and Development (IBRD)
- International Civil Aviation Organization (ICAO)
- International Development Association (IDA)
- International Federation of Red Cross and Red Crescent Societies (IFRCS)
- International Finance Corporation (IFC)
- International Monetary Fund (IMF)
- International Olympic Committee (IOC)
- International Red Cross and Red Crescent Movement (ICRM)
- International Telecommunication Union (ITU)
- International Telecommunications Satellite Organization (ITSO)
- Multilateral Investment Guarantee Agency (MIGA)
- Organisation for the Prohibition of Chemical Weapons (OPCW)
- Pacific Islands Forum (PIF)
- Secretariat of the Pacific Community (SPC)
- South Pacific Regional Trade and Economic Cooperation Agreement (Sparteca)
- United Nations (UN)
- United Nations Conference on Trade and Development (UNCTAD)
- United Nations Educational, Scientific, and Cultural Organization (UNESCO)
- World Health Organization (WHO)
- World Meteorological Organization (WMO)

=== Law and order in the Federated States of Micronesia ===
Law of the Federated States of Micronesia

- Abortion in the Federated States of Micronesia
- Cannabis in the Federated States of Micronesia
- Constitution of the Federated States of Micronesia
- Crime in the Federated States of Micronesia
  - Human trafficking in the Federated States of Micronesia
- Human rights in the Federated States of Micronesia
  - LGBT rights in the Federated States of Micronesia
  - Freedom of religion in the Federated States of Micronesia
- Law enforcement in the Federated States of Micronesia

=== Military of the Federated States of Micronesia ===
- Compact of Free Association § Military provisions
- Island Soldier

=== Local government in the Federated States of Micronesia ===
Local government in the Federated States of Micronesia

== History of the Federated States of Micronesia ==
History of the Federated States of Micronesia

- Timeline of the history of the Federated States of Micronesia
  - 2018 in the Federated States of Micronesia
  - 2020 in the Federated States of Micronesia
  - 2021 in the Federated States of Micronesia
  - 2022 in the Federated States of Micronesia
- National Register of Historic Places listings in the Federated States of Micronesia
- Postage stamps and postal history of the Federated States of Micronesia

== Culture of the Federated States of Micronesia ==
Culture of the Federated States of Micronesia

- Architecture of the Federated States of Micronesia
- Cuisine of the Federated States of Micronesia
- Festivals in the Federated States of Micronesia
- Languages of the Federated States of Micronesia
- Libraries in the Federated States of Micronesia
- Media in the Federated States of Micronesia
- Museums in the Federated States of Micronesia
- National symbols of the Federated States of Micronesia
  - Flag of the Federated States of Micronesia
  - National anthem of the Federated States of Micronesia
  - Seal of the Federated States of Micronesia
- People of the Federated States of Micronesia
- Public holidays in the Federated States of Micronesia
- Records of the Federated States of Micronesia
- Religion in the Federated States of Micronesia
  - Christianity in the Federated States of Micronesia
    - Apostolic Nunciature to the Federated States of Micronesia
    - The Church of Jesus Christ of Latter-day Saints in the Federated States of Micronesia
  - Hinduism in the Federated States of Micronesia
  - Islam in the Federated States of Micronesia
  - Judaism in the Federated States of Micronesia
  - Sikhism in the Federated States of Micronesia
- Scouting in the Federated States of Micronesia
- Time in the Federated States of Micronesia
- Women in the Federated States of Micronesia
- World Heritage Sites in the Federated States of Micronesia: None

=== Art in the Federated States of Micronesia ===
- Art in the Federated States of Micronesia
- Cinema of the Federated States of Micronesia
- Dance in the Federated States of Micronesia
- Literature of the Federated States of Micronesia
- Music of the Federated States of Micronesia
- Television in the Federated States of Micronesia
- Theatre in the Federated States of Micronesia

=== Sports in the Federated States of Micronesia ===
Sports in the Federated States of Micronesia

- Rugby union in the Federated States of Micronesia
- Federated States of Micronesia at the 2017 Asian Indoor and Martial Arts Games
- Federated States of Micronesia at the 2017 World Championships in Athletics
- Federated States of Micronesia at the 2011 Pacific Games
- Federated States of Micronesia at the 2015 Pacific Games
- Federated States of Micronesia at the 2019 Pacific Games

==== Athletics in the Federated States of Micronesia ====
- List of Federated States of Micronesia records in athletics
- Federated States of Micronesia Athletic Association
- Federated States of Micronesia at the 2009 World Championships in Athletics
- Federated States of Micronesia at the 2011 World Championships in Athletics
- Federated States of Micronesia at the 2013 World Championships in Athletics
- Federated States of Micronesia at the 2015 World Championships in Athletics
- Federated States of Micronesia at the 2019 World Athletics Championships
- Federated States of Micronesia at the 2022 World Athletics Championships

==== Football in the Federated States of Micronesia ====
Football in the Federated States of Micronesia

- Federated States of Micronesia Football Association
- Federated States of Micronesia national football team
- Federated States of Micronesia national under-23 football team

==== Federated States of Micronesia at the Olympics ====
Federated States of Micronesia at the Olympics

- Federated States of Micronesia Olympic Committee
- Federated States of Micronesia at the 2000 Summer Olympics
- Federated States of Micronesia at the 2004 Summer Olympics
- Federated States of Micronesia at the 2008 Summer Olympics
- Federated States of Micronesia at the 2010 Summer Youth Olympics
- Federated States of Micronesia at the 2012 Summer Olympics
- Federated States of Micronesia at the 2014 Summer Youth Olympics
- Federated States of Micronesia at the 2016 Summer Olympics
- Federated States of Micronesia at the 2018 Summer Youth Olympics
- Federated States of Micronesia at the 2020 Summer Olympics
- List of flag bearers for the Federated States of Micronesia at the Olympics
- List of Federated States of Micronesia records in Olympic weightlifting

==== Federated States of Micronesia at the World Aquatics Championships ====
- Federated States of Micronesia at the 2011 World Aquatics Championships
- Federated States of Micronesia at the 2013 World Aquatics Championships
- Federated States of Micronesia at the 2015 World Aquatics Championships
- Federated States of Micronesia at the 2017 World Aquatics Championships
- Federated States of Micronesia at the 2019 World Aquatics Championships
- Federated States of Micronesia at the 2022 World Aquatics Championships

== Economy and infrastructure of the Federated States of Micronesia ==
Economy of the Federated States of Micronesia

- Economic rank, by nominal GDP (2007): 184th (one hundred and eighty fourth)
- Agriculture in the Federated States of Micronesia
  - Aquaculture in the Federated States of Micronesia
- Banking in the Federated States of Micronesia
  - National Bank of the Federated States of Micronesia
- Communications in the Federated States of Micronesia
  - Telecommunications in the Federated States of Micronesia
    - Internet in the Federated States of Micronesia
    - List of radio stations in the Federated States of Micronesia
    - Telephone numbers in the Federated States of Micronesia
  - Postage stamps and postal history of the Federated States of Micronesia
- Companies of the Federated States of Micronesia
- Currency of the Federated States of Micronesia: Dollar
  - ISO 4217: USD
- Energy in the Federated States of Micronesia
  - Energy policy of the Federated States of Micronesia
  - Oil industry in the Federated States of Micronesia
- Hospitals in the Federated States of Micronesia
- Mining in the Federated States of Micronesia
- Tourism in the Federated States of Micronesia
- Trade unions in the Federated States of Micronesia
- Transportation in the Federated States of Micronesia
- Federated States of Micronesia Stock Exchange

== Education in the Federated States of Micronesia ==
Education in the Federated States of Micronesia

== Health in the Federated States of Micronesia ==
Health in the Federated States of Micronesia

- COVID-19 pandemic in the Federated States of Micronesia

== Infrastructure of the Federated States of Micronesia ==
- Health care in the Federated States of Micronesia
- Transportation in the Federated States of Micronesia
  - Lighthouses in the Federated States of Micronesia
  - Airports in the Federated States of Micronesia
  - Rail transport in the Federated States of Micronesia: none
  - Vehicular transport in the Federated States of Micronesia
    - Roads in the Federated States of Micronesia
    - Vehicle registration plates of the Federated States of Micronesia
- Water supply and sanitation in the Federated States of Micronesia

== See also ==
- Federated States of Micronesia
- List of Federated States of Micronesia-related topics
- List of international rankings
- Member state of the United Nations
- Outline of geography
- Outline of Oceania
