= Women in the Federated States of Micronesia =

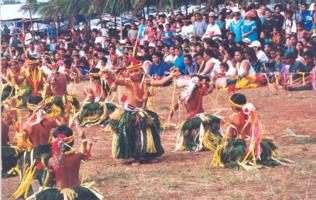
Yapese women dancers of the Federated States of Micronesia wearing traditional dress while celebrating Yap Day in 1999.

Women in the Federated States of Micronesia are women who live in or are from the Federated States of Micronesia, an independent sovereign island nation composed of four states. Thus, FSM women includes women from the States of Yap, Chuuk, Pohnpei (formerly Ponape) and Kosrae (previously known as Kusaie).

== Roles ==
By tradition, clan membership in Micronesia society is generally passed down through women. Women were the cultivators of the land and they were the producers of staple food crops. They also did inshore fishing and were sea food gatherers. Women were also involved in arts and crafts such as in the production of thatch weaving, "loom-woven lavalavas, pandanus mats, medicine and ornaments". They are caretakers and "primary teachers" of children. Micronesian women were the initiators in community planning, the peacemakers, economic contributors, "preservers of the home", "acquirers of prestige", and they also have roles in Micronesian politics.

In general, women share power with their male counterparts in Micronesian society. Women's roles were complementary to the roles of men. Some Micronesian women contribute decisions regarding disposal of family land, and they have the "power to disinherit members of the family", as well as the imposer of taboos regarding the use of both land and sea.

Traditionally, men and women would balance labor by performing different roles in cultivating and preparing food. However, with recent changes in island culture such as the rise of imported foreign foods, the duty of working in the kitchen has largely been given to the women. This imbalance of labor performed by women is being addressed by the minority of modernized Micronesian families where traditional roles shared by men and women.

Micronesian women can force men to make peace with their enemies. Women were often the drafters of the "terms of peace". A senior female would have a title that is parallel to the senior male member of the so-called Pohnpeian lineage, and she would have "considerable authority" over the group. The senior women can act as a person intervening matters such as in stopping a man from beating his children" and when and how long a man should refrain from sleeping with his wife after childbirth.

During the Yap Day festival in March, Micronesian women wear traditional costumes and perform traditional dances.

== See also ==
- Public holidays in the Federated States of Micronesia
- Music of the Federated States of Micronesia
- Human trafficking in the Federated States of Micronesia
- Japanese settlement in the Federated States of Micronesia
- Japanese settlement in Micronesia
- Chuuk Women's Council
- Yap Women's Association
