= Rugby union in the Federated States of Micronesia =

Rugby union in the Federated States of Micronesia is a minor but growing sport.

== History ==
Micronesia's main problems are related to geographical factors - its population lives on widely separated tropical coral atolls in the South Pacific Ocean. All of this makes a rugby infrastructure difficult to construct, and the islands are beset by rising sea levels. The geographic future of Micronesia depends on the height of the ocean. Most land is no more than two metres above high water of ordinary tides. There is also a lack of land for specifically designated rugby pitches.

Micronesian rugby is mainly centred on Pohnpei.

In 1995, Guam Rugby Club undertook tours to Saipan (in the Northern Marianas), Palau, Pohnpei and continental Asia.

Rugby Sevens has been a sport in the South Pacific Games since the late 1990s.

In 2009, the islands were visited by the president of the Japan Rugby Association, Yoshiro Mori.

== See also ==
- Rugby union in Guam
- Rugby union in Nauru
- Rugby union in the Marshall Islands
- Rugby union in the Northern Mariana Islands
