= Islam in the Federated States of Micronesia =

Islam in the Federated States of Micronesiais a minority religion in the Pacific island country, where the population is predominantly Christian. The Muslim community is very small, and Islam has become visible in the country only in recent years, mainly through migration and international connections.

== History ==
The spread of Islam in the Federated States of Micronesia and the broader Micronesia region has mainly occurred through migration and international connections. Due to commercial relations with some Muslim communities from Southeast Asia, particularly Indonesia, Malaysia, and the Philippines, Islam has gained some recognition in the region. In modern times, the Muslim population in Micronesia has increased primarily due to migrant workers. Some reports indicate that several Muslim families reside in the country and practice Islam while blending with the local culture.

In the early stages, Islam faced strong social resistance in the Federated States of Micronesia. During the colonial period, the population had largely converted to Christianity and was reluctant to accept other religions. Despite this, with the support of two U.S. Congress members, the President of Micronesia, Emanuel Mori, granted official registration approval to the Ahmadiyya community in the Kosrae state in April 2015.

== Present situation ==
Although the Muslim population in the Federated States of Micronesia is small, they strive to maintain their Islamic practices. There are no large mosques in the country, but small prayer spaces and Islamic learning centers exist. Muslims generally offer prayers at home or gather for communal prayers. They also observe important Islamic festivals, including Ramadan.

=== Challenges and obstacles ===
While religious tolerance prevails in the country, there are some challenges in spreading Islam. One significant issue is the limited availability of Halal food. Additionally, there are almost no Islamic educational institutions in the country. Since the Muslim community is small, opportunities for the younger generation to practice Islam are also limited. Some Muslim families rely on online resources and international Islamic organizations to teach their children basic Islamic principles.

=== Discrimination ===
The small Ahmadiyya community in the country has reported cases of discrimination. They have claimed that they are denied access to government services and that their properties have been attacked due to their religious identity. In Kosrae state, one of its five municipalities, Malem Municipality, proposed a law that could ban Islam and other non-Christian religions, with violations carrying a maximum fine of $10,000.

Despite their efforts, the Ahmadiyya Muslim Community has encountered challenges. In Kosrae State, they reported slow police responses to incidents of discrimination in receiving public services. Additionally, instances of discrimination and vandalism have been reported, reflecting some societal intolerance towards non-Christian religions.

=== Religious freedom ===
According to the Constitution of the Federated States of Micronesia, the country cannot establish a state religion or restrict religious freedom. There are no mandatory registration requirements for religious communities. Religious education is prohibited in public schools, but private religious schools are allowed to provide religious instruction if they follow the curriculum set by the Ministry of Education.

== See also ==
- Religion in the Federated States of Micronesia
