= Demographics of the Federated States of Micronesia =

Demographics of Federated States of Micronesia
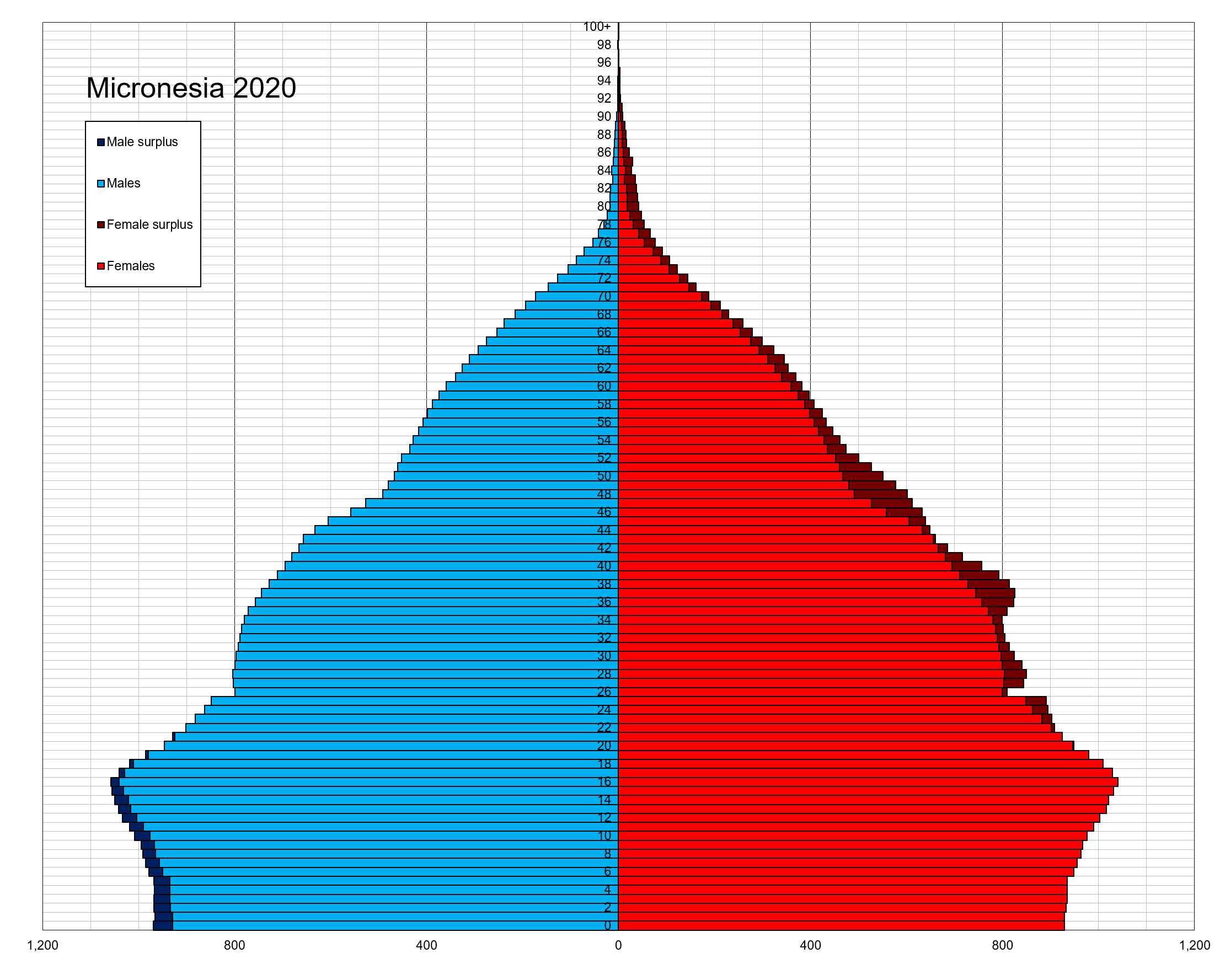
- Population pyramid of Micronesia in 2020
- Population: 101,009 (2022 est.)
- Growth rate: -0.67% (2022 est.)
- Birth rate: 18.39 births/1,000 population (2022 est.)
- Death rate: 4.19 deaths/1,000 population (2022 est.)
- Life expectancy: 74.44 years
  - male: 72.34 years
  - female: 76.66 years
- Fertility rate: 2.24 children born/woman (2022 est.)
- Infant mortality rate: 21.9 deaths/1,000 live births
- Net migration rate: -20.91 migrant(s)/1,000 population (2022 est.)

Age structure
- 0–14 years: 28.24%
- 65 and over: 4.95%

Nationality
- Nationality: Micronesian

Demographic features of the population of the Federated States of Micronesia include population density, ethnicity, education level, health of the populace, economic status, religious affiliations and other aspects. The indigenous population of the Federated States of Micronesia, which is predominantly Micronesian, consists of various ethnolinguistic groups. English has become the common language. Population growth remains high at more than 3%, but is ameliorated somewhat by net emigration.

The island of Pingelap is genetically notable for the prevalence of the extreme form of color blindness known as maskun.

== Population ==
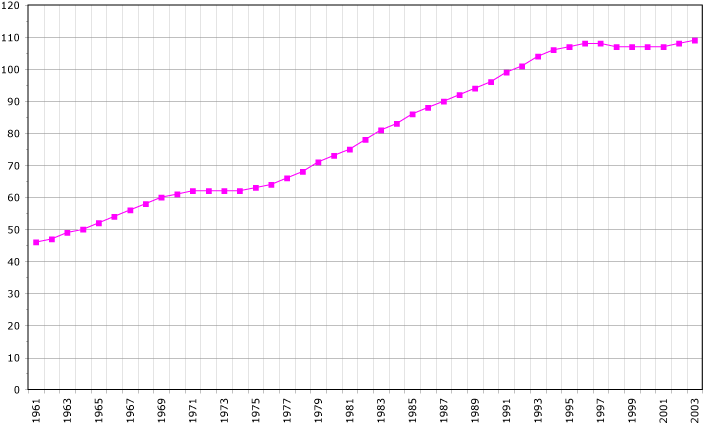
Demographics of the Federated States of Micronesia, Data of FAO, year 2005; Number of inhabitants in thousands.

=== Structure of the population ===
Population Estimates by Sex and Age Group (01.VII.2021) (Based on the 2010 Population and Housing Census and 2013/2014 Household Income and Expenditure Survey.):

Age group	Male	Female	Total	%
Total	53 202	51 630	104 832	100
0–4	6 261	6 045	12 306	11.74
5–9	6 257	5 913	12 170	11.61
10–14	6 643	6 287	12 930	12.33
15–19	6 359	5 861	12 220	11.66
20–24	5 001	4 541	9 542	9.10
25–29	3 917	3 879	7 796	7.44
30–34	3 463	3 256	6 718	6.41
35–39	2 985	3 077	6 062	5.78
40–44	2 772	2 919	5 691	5.43
45–49	2 693	2 598	5 291	5.05
50–54	2 347	2 367	4 713	4.50
55–59	1 911	1 771	3 682	3.51
60–64	1 192	1 145	2 336	2.23
65+	1 404	1 969	3 373	3.22
Age group	Male	Female	Total	Percent
0–14	19 161	18 245	37 406	35.68
15–64	32 637	31 416	64 053	61.10
65+	1 404	1 969	3 373	3.22

== Ethnic groups ==
Chuukese 49.3%, Pohnpeian 29.8%, Kosraean 6.3%, Yapese 5.7%, other 8.9%

== Languages ==
English (official and common language), Chuukese, Pohnpeian, Yapese, Kosraean (recognized at state level in Chuuk, Pohnpei, Yap and Kosrae respectively) In addition other language such as Pingelapese, Ngatikese, Satawalese, Puluwatese, Mortlockese, Mokilese, Ulithian, Woleaian, Nukuoro, and Kapingamarangi are recognized.

== Religion ==
Roman Catholic 54.7%, Protestant 41.1%, other and none 4.2% (see Religion in the Federated States of Micronesia)
