= Terminalia carolinensis =

Scientific classification
- Kingdom: Plantae
- Clade: Tracheophytes
- Clade: Angiosperms
- Clade: Eudicots
- Clade: Rosids
- Order: Myrtales
- Family: Combretaceae
- Genus: Terminalia
- Species: T. carolinensis

Binomial name
- Terminalia carolinensis Kaneh.

Species of tree

Terminalia carolinensis, commonly known as the ka tree or keima tree, is a tree that grows on the Micronesian islands of Kosrae and Pohnpei. The trees have umbrella shaped crowns and mossy buttressed bases. The trees are found in the Yela Forest. Known as Keima on Pohnpei and Ka on Kosrae, it is used for timber, canoe manufacture, cabinetry, flooring, for medicine and for its edible nuts.
