= The Church of Jesus Christ of Latter-day Saints in the Federated States of Micronesia =

- Area: Asia North
- Members: 6,241 (2025)
- Stakes: 1
- Districts: 1
- Wards: 5
- Branches: 17
- Total Congregations: 22
- FamilySearch Centers: 11

The Church of Jesus Christ of Latter-day Saints in the Federated States of Micronesia refers to the Church of Jesus Christ of Latter-day Saints (LDS Church) and its members in the Federated States of Micronesia (FSM). The church's first known missionaries arrived on July 5, 1978. As of December 31, 2025, there were 6,241 members in 22 congregations in FSM. The LDS Church has congregations in every state in the FSM.

== History ==
Membership in the Federated States of Micronesia
| Year | Membership |
|---|---|
| 1979 | 500 |
| 1983 | 764 |
| 1989* | 1,900 |
| 1999 | 3,008 |
| 2009 | 3,841 |
| 2019 | 6,307 |
| 2025 | 6,241 |
*Membership was published as a rounded number. Source: Wendell J. Ashton; Jim M. Wall, Deseret News, various years, Church Almanac Country Information: Micronesia

=== Pohnpei ===
Missionary work on Pohnpei Island began on 23 October 1976, when George L. Mortensen and Aldric Porter arrived. These missionaries were sent under request of Ohren R. Ohry who had joined the church while at BYU-Hawaii. The first baptisms on the island were on March 5, 1977 when Ohry’s wife, Rihne, other family members, along with Siesero Salomon were baptized in the village of Mand. Naped S. Elias and his family, along with Perden Samson, were baptized in Kolonia a week later, on March 12, 1977. The Mand and Kolonia Pohnpei branches were created shortly thereafter. Originally, missionaries served as branch presidents, then with native leaders–Naped Elias as president of the Kolonia Branch and Johnny Bridge as president of the Mand Branch. The branches were initially in the Guam District. A third branch was created in Sapwalap in December 1977, and three meetinghouses were built between October 1980 and September 1981 in Sapwalap, Mand, and Kolonia. The Truk-Pohnpei District was created on 31 May 1981. On November 22, 1985, the district was divided and the Truk and Pohnpei districts were created. In 1990, membership was 464. In late 1993, 18 young women in the Pohnpei District held their first camp on the island of Madolenihmn. The Panasang Pohnpei Stake was created on March 16, 2014.

The Book of Mormon was translated into Pohnpeian in 1987.

On April 18, 2012, the church donated five sewing machines, three fishing spears, goggles, fins, snorkels and underwater lights as a humanitarian donation to the Ohwa International Christian Academy in its efforts to teach self-reliance to its students. The fishing supplies were donated to augment a previous church donation of a boat, outboard engine and fishing nets to the school that has helped provide fish for the students for several years. On October 16, the church donated 2,000 reusable face masks to the Sokehs Municipality Schools in Pohnpei, which were distributed the following week to 1,000 students.

=== Chuuk ===
The first missionaries in Chuuk (formerly Truk), Donald M. Baldwin and Torlik Tima, arrived on July 7, 1977. They baptized T. M. Conrad Mailo and his wife, Nisor Cerly David, on October 22, 1977. The Truk Branch (later Mwan Branch) was created on July 26, 1979. By 1980, membership reached 170, and on 31 May 1981, the Truk-Pohnpei District was created. On April 24, 1983, the first meetinghouse on Chuuk was dedicated. The Truk-Pohnpei District was divided in 1985 and the Truk (later renamed the Namonuito Chuuk District) and Pohnpei districts were created.

In 2010, the church donated a desalination unit to the people of Chuuk that is capable of producing 26,000 gallons of water per day.

=== Yap ===
In 1977, Charles Keliikipi, who was under contract to form a police department on the island, organized the LDS Church in Yap. The first convert was baptized in March 1978. The first senior missionary couple arrived on Yap on August 2, 1979. The church's first meetinghouse on Yap was completed on January 13, 1981. The Yap Micronesia District was created on March 18, 1981. Yap has two branches, one in Colonia and another in Thol. A 2000 census found that there were 121 members of the LDS Church on Yap.

The Yapese translation of the Book of Mormon was completed and published in 2004. In 2018, the online edition was made available.

Church volunteers provided cleanup and relief during the aftermath of Typhoon Mitag and Typhoon Sudal.

=== Kosrae ===
The first missionaries to arrive in Kosrae were Matterson Ramon and Ioichey Diapulos, both natives of Pohnpei, on March 26, 1985. The first Kosraean to be baptized was Isidro Abraham on April 26, 1986. The Lelu Branch was organized on June 18, 1986. A second branch was created in Utwe in 1988. The Kosrae Micronesia District was created on March 14, 1990. The first seminary graduation took place on 1 August 1990. Ground had been broken for the Malem church building on December 21, 1989, and the completed facility was dedicated on December 3, 1992. The Lelu church building was dedicated in January 1993. There are 365 members between these two branches.

Since 2018, the LDS Church has partnered with the Lelu Farmers Association on Kosrae to build family greenhouses and to provide grow bags and soil amendments to the recipients. In 2018, ten greenhouses were built, with ten more in 2019, and twenty more being built in 2020. On July 25, 2020, the church donated an excavator to the Lelu Farmers Association.

== Stakes, districts, and congregations ==
As of August 2023, the following congregations were located in the FSM:

Namoneas Chuuk District

- Fare Branch
- Mechitiw Branch
- Mwan Branch
- Pata Branch
- Romanum Branch
- Sapuk Branch
- Tonowas Branch
- Udot Branch
- Uman Branch
- Wichap Branch

Panasang Pohnpei Stake

- Eirike Ward
- Kitti Branch
- Mand Branch
- Palikir Ward
- Panasang Ward
- Sapwalap Ward
- Sekere Ward
- Uh Branch

Yap (Barrigada Guam Stake)

- Colonia Branch
- Thol Branch

Kosrae (not part of a stake or district)

- Lelu Branch
- Utwe Branch

Other

The Micronesia/Guam Mission Branch serves individuals and families not in proximity of a meetinghouse and is not part of a stake or district.

== Missions ==
Micronesia is located in the Micronesia Guam Mission.

== Temples ==
Members in FSM are in the Yigo Guam Temple district.

== See also ==
- Religion in the Federated States of Micronesia
- Religion in Yap
