= Football in the Federated States of Micronesia =

- Country: Federated States of Micronesia
- Governing body: Federated States of Micronesia Football Association
- National team: men's national team

International competitions
- OFC Champions League; FIFA World Cup

The sport of football in the country of the Federated States of Micronesia is run by the Federated States of Micronesia Football Association. The association administers the national football team, as well as the Pohnpei Premier League. Association football is a popular sport in Micronesia, but not as popular as basketball, the most popular sport in the country.

== Football stadiums in Micronesia ==
Stadium	Capacity	City
Yap Sports Complex	2,000	Ruu
