= Yela Ka Forest =

Tree conservation area

Coordinates: 5.327°N 162.951°E

- Interactive map of Yela Ka Forest

Geography
- Location: Yela Valley, Kosrae, Federated States of Micronesia
- Area: 78 acres (32 ha)

Ecology
- Dominant tree species: ka trees (Terminalia carolinensis)

Yela Ka Forest is a conservation area of ka trees (Terminalia carolinensis) in the Yela Valley on the island of Kosrae in the Federated States of Micronesia. The trees are also found on the island of Pohnpei. A conservation easement, the first achieved outside the Americas, protects 78 acres (32 ha) of the 1,400 acre (570 ha) valley.
