= Religion in the Federated States of Micronesia =

Religion in the FSM (2022 estimate)
1. Catholic (55.0%)
2. Protestant (42.0%)
3. Other Christian (2.00%)
4. Other (1.00%)

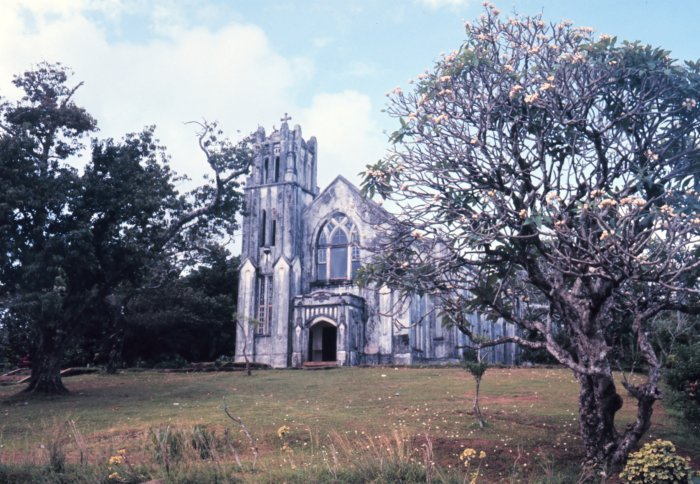
St. Endelienta's Cathedral in Kolonia, Pohnpei State

Christianity is the predominant religion in the Federated States of Micronesia and represents an integral part of the nation's identity.

The country is secular and its constitution guarantees the freedom of religion. Before the arrival of European missionaries, the various ethnic groups residing in the territory of modern day Federated States of Micronesia practised a variety of faiths.

== Demographics ==
The Roman Catholic Church, as well as several Protestant denominations, were active in every Micronesian state in 2007; most Protestant groups trace their roots to American Congregationalist missionaries.

On the island of Kosrae, the population is approximately 7,800; (95% Protestant). On Pohnpei, the population of 35,000 is evenly divided between Catholics and Protestants (50% Catholic & 50% Protestant). On Chuuk and Yap, the population is 60% Catholic & 40% Protestant.

Religious groups with small followings include Baptists, Assemblies of God, Salvation Army, Seventh-day Adventists, Jehovah's Witnesses, the Church of Jesus Christ of Latter-day Saints, as well as Jews, Hindus and the Baháʼí Faith.

There is a small group of Buddhists on Pohnpei (0.43% of the population as of 2020). Attendance at religious services was high in 2007; churches were well supported by their congregations and played a significant role in civil society.

The Ahmadiyya Muslims were registered in Kosrae in July 2015, despite strong public resistance against Islam in the country. There were 35 Ahmadiyya Muslims as of 2022; there is an Ahmadi community centre in Pohnpei State although some followers also live in Kosrae.

Most immigrants are Filipino Catholics who have joined local Catholic churches. The Filipino Iglesia ni Cristo also has a church in Pohnpei. In the 1890s, on the island of Pohnpei, intermissionary conflicts and the conversion of clan leaders resulted in religious divisions along clan lines which persist today. Protestants are the majority on the western side of the island, while Catholics are the majority on the eastern side.

== Religious freedom ==
The constitution of Micronesia states that laws establishing a state religion or impeding the freedom of religion may not be passed.

There are no registration requirements for religious groups. There is no religious education in public schools, but private religious schools are allowed so long as they also teach the curriculum established by the Department of Education.

In 2023, the country was scored 4 out of 4 for religious freedom.

== See also ==
- Religion in Yap
- Roman Catholic Diocese of Caroline Islands
- The Church of Jesus Christ of Latter-day Saints in the Federated States of Micronesia
- Adelyn Noda
