= List of Federated States of Micronesia records in Olympic weightlifting =

The following are the national records in Olympic weightlifting in the Federated States of Micronesia. Records are maintained in each weight class for the snatch lift, clean and jerk lift, and the total for both lifts by the FSM Weightlifting Association.

== Current records ==
=== Men ===
Event	Record	Athlete	Date	Meet	Place	Ref
60 kg
Snatch						
Clean & Jerk						
Total						
65 kg
Snatch						
Clean & Jerk						
Total						
71 kg
Snatch						
Clean & Jerk						
Total						
79 kg
Snatch						
Clean & Jerk						
Total						
88 kg
Snatch	112 kg	Aiden Sangu Sumor Gimed	30 April 2026	Oceania Championships	Apia, Samoa	
Clean & Jerk	133 kg	Aiden Sangu Sumor Gimed	30 April 2026	Oceania Championships	Apia, Samoa	
Total	245 kg	Aiden Sangu Sumor Gimed	30 April 2026	Oceania Championships	Apia, Samoa	
94 kg
Snatch						
Clean & Jerk						
Total						
110 kg
Snatch						
Clean & Jerk						
Total						
+110 kg
Snatch						
Clean & Jerk						
Total						

== Historical records ==
=== Men (2018–2025) ===
Event	Record	Athlete	Date	Meet	Place	Ref
55 kg
Snatch						
Clean and Jerk						
Total						
61 kg
Snatch						
Clean & Jerk						
Total						
67 kg
Snatch						
Clean & Jerk						
Total						
73 kg
Snatch						
Clean and Jerk						
Total						
81 kg
Snatch						
Clean and Jerk						
Total						
89 kg
Snatch						
Clean and Jerk						
Total						
96 kg
Snatch						
Clean and Jerk						
Total						
102 kg
Snatch						
Clean and Jerk						
Total						
109 kg
Snatch						
Clean and Jerk						
Total						
+109 kg
Snatch						
Clean and Jerk						
Total						

=== Women (2018–2025) ===
Event	Record	Athlete	Date	Meet	Place	Ref
45 kg
Snatch						
Clean and Jerk						
Total						
49 kg
Snatch						
Clean and Jerk						
Total						
55 kg
Snatch						
Clean and Jerk						
Total						
59 kg
Snatch						
Clean & Jerk						
Total						
64 kg
Snatch						
Clean and Jerk						
Total						
71 kg
Snatch						
Clean and Jerk						
Total						
76 kg
Snatch						
Clean and Jerk						
Total						
81 kg
Snatch						
Clean and Jerk						
Total						
87 kg
Snatch						
Clean and Jerk						
Total						
+87 kg
Snatch						
Clean and Jerk						
Total						

== Historical records ==
=== Men (1998–2018) ===
Event	Record	Athlete	Date	Meet	Place	Ref
–56 kg
Snatch	124 kg	Manuel Minginfel	27 August 2007	Pacific Games	Apia, Samoa	
Clean and jerk	152 kg	Manuel Minginfel	27 August 2007	Pacific Games	Apia, Samoa	
Total	276 kg	Manuel Minginfel	27 August 2007	Pacific Games	Apia, Samoa	
–62 kg
Snatch	129 kg	Manuel Minginfel	9 December 2006		Apia, Samoa	
Clean & Jerk						
Total						
–69 kg
Snatch	122 kg	Manuel Minginfel	22 November 2015	World Championships	Houston, United States	
Clean & Jerk	150 kg	Manuel Minginfel	22 November 2015	World Championships	Houston, United States	
Total	272 kg	Manuel Minginfel	22 November 2015	World Championships	Houston, United States	
–77 kg
Snatch						
Clean and jerk						
Total						
–85 kg
Snatch						
Clean and jerk						
Total						
–94 kg
Snatch						
Clean and jerk						
Total						
–105 kg
Snatch						
Clean and jerk						
Total						
+105 kg
Snatch						
Clean and jerk						
Total						

=== Women (1998–2018) ===
Event	Record	Athlete	Date	Meet	Place	Ref
-48 kg
Snatch						
Clean and jerk						
Total						
-53 kg
Snatch						
Clean and jerk						
Total						
-58 kg
Snatch						
Clean and jerk						
Total						
-63 kg
Snatch						
Clean and jerk						
Total						
-69 kg
Snatch						
Clean and jerk						
Total						
-75 kg
Snatch						
Clean and jerk						
Total						
+75 kg
Snatch						
Clean and jerk						
Total						
