= Trade unions in the Federated States of Micronesia =

International Labour Organization
- Federated States of Micronesia is not a member of the ILO

With a very small population, and an economy often entailing subsistence farming and fishing, Micronesia does not have a trade union structure. There is a general constitutional right to form associations; however, the government is the primary source of formal jobs, and sets wages administratively.

Micronesia is not a member of the International Labour Organization.
