= Yap Women's Association =

Women's Association in the Federated States of Micronesia

Yap Women's Association is a women's rights organisation in Yap State, in the Federated States of Micronesia. Founded in 1955 as a non-profit, it works to provide resources for women in the state.

== Background ==
The Yap Women's Association was founded in 1955 as a non-profit initiative to represent women's groups in Yap State. One of its founders was nurse and activist Anna Falgog, who brought together women who worked in government to set up a women's group.

== Programmes ==
The YWA acts as an intermediary between the national government and local groups. As reported in 1992, the YWA could provide catering and dancers for events targeted at tourists. In 1995 the YWA supported the Pacific Islands Association of Libraries and Archives Conference and was represented by Laura Tiningdad. As of 2001, a member of the YWA served each year on the Yap Day committee. In 2009, the association supported the creation of the Neighboring Islands Women Association, to deliver services for the outer islands surrounding Yap. The initiative was led by Irene Futumai.

As of 2013, seventy-three groups were registered with the association. In 2017, the Chinese government gave the association a grant of $120,000 to fund the construction of a new building. Between 2015 and 2019, assistant attorney general Rachelle Bergeron, who was later murdered, worked closely with and updated the bye-laws of the YWA. In 2018, the YWA hosted Baklai Temengil and Jennifer Chieng in the run-up to the 2018 MicroGames.

As of 2020, the president of the YWA was Laura Ngaden. In 2013, she was the State Electoral Commissioner.
