= List of ambassadors of the Federated States of Micronesia to China =

Coordinates: 39.909454°N 116.437905°E

Ambassador of Federated States of Micronesia to China
- Incumbent; Akillino H. Susaia since June 30, 2010
- Inaugural holder: Masao Nakayama
- Formation: December 18, 1992

The Micronesian ambassador in Beijing is the official representative of the government in Palikir to the Government of China.

== List of representatives ==
Diplomatic agrément/Diplomatic accreditation	ambassador	Observations	President of the Federated States of Micronesia	Premier of the People's Republic of China	Term end
November 3, 1986		Independence Compact of Free Association	Tosiwo Nakayama	Zhao Ziyang	
September 11, 1989		The governments in Beijing and Palikir established mutual recognition.	John Haglelgam	Li Peng	
December 18, 1992	Masao Nakayama	From 1989 to 1993 he was the first ambassador in Tokyo, Japan.	Bailey Olter	Li Peng	
January 25, 2000	Alik Likiaksa Alik	Non resident, resident in Tokyo	Leo Falcam	Zhu Rongji	
August 16, 2005	Kasio Emil Mida	Non resident, resident in Tokyo	Joseph Urusemal	Wen Jiabao	
June 30, 2005	Carlson D. Apis	Chargé d'affaires	Manny Mori	Wen Jiabao	
June 30, 2010	Akillino H. Susaia	The first resident ambassador in Beijing, China.	Manny Mori	Wen Jiabao	
