= List of radio stations in the Federated States of Micronesia =

This is a List of radio stations in the Federated States of Micronesia.

== AM ==
- 999 V6AF Pohnpei (Christian)
- 1260 V6AG Pohnpei Joy Radio (formerly on 999 AM)
- 1350 V6A Moen (Christian)
- 1449 V6AH Kolonia/Pohnpei https://web.archive.org/web/20070930185423/http://www.fm/ppbc/V6AH/V6AH.htm
- 1494 V6AI Kolonia/Yap http://www.fm/yap/radio.htm
- 1503 V6AJ Kosrae/Tofol http://www.fm/kosrae/radio.htm (formerly 1584 AM)
- 1593 V6AK Chuuk/Weno

== SW ==
- 4.755 V6MP The Cross, Ran by Pacific Mission Aviation. (Christian, currently silent)

== FM ==
- 88.5 V6MA Pohnpei (Christian)
- 88.9 V6JY Makiy, Yap (Christian)
- 89.7 V6AA Colonia, Yap
- 101.0 V6AV Pohnpei (Christian)
- 104.0 V6AF Pohnpei (Christian)
