= Aquaculture in the Federated States of Micronesia =

Aquaculture in the Federated States of Micronesia includes the cultivation of giant clams and sponges. The FSM government has explored aquaculture as a possible method of stimulating the national economy and increasing the number of jobs among the nation's populace.
