= Rugby union in the Northern Mariana Islands =

Rugby union in the northern Mariana Islands is a minor but growing sport.

== History ==
Rugby came to the Marianas via three separate streams, firstly, through the visits of British, New Zealand and Australian sailors; secondly, through the American presence, which has been there from the turn of the twentieth century; and thirdly through contact with neighbouring Pacific islands, where the game is popular.

Rugby is strongest in Saipan, where there is a formally established rugby club, which plays games against touring sides, and visiting ships. However, dominance by US media, tends to mean that rugby gets little media coverage. In addition, geography and population cause other problems. Saipan RFC has players from Samoa, Tonga, Cook Islands, New Zealand and Fiji.

In 1995, Guam Rugby Club undertook tours to Saipan, Palau, Pohnpei (Micronesia), and continental Asia. The main rivalry tends to be between Saipan and Guam, and they have played each other a number of times since 1990.

Rugby Sevens has been a sport in the South Pacific Games since the late 1990s.
