= Rugby union in the Marshall Islands =

Rugby union in the Marshall Islands is a minor but growing sport.

== History ==
Rugby was introduced to the islands at some point in the twentieth century.

Like many other Pacific nations, rugby is often not formally organised. Due to their small numbers, and scattered island population, they have often preferred rugby sevens to the XV game. However, rugby is less popular in the Marshall Islands, than some of the other Pacific islands.

Rugby Sevens has been a sport in the South Pacific Games since the late 1990s.

The Marshall Islands' main problems are related to population and geographical factors - their population is 61,963, and lives on 29 coral atolls and 5 isolated islands in the South Pacific Ocean. All of this makes a rugby infrastructure difficult to construct, and the islands are beset by rising sea levels. The geographic future of the Marshall Islands depends on the height of the ocean. No significant land is more than two metres above high water of ordinary tides. This means they are particularly vulnerable to any possible sea level rises caused by global warming. There is also a lack of land for specifically designated rugby pitches.

Much of the playing population consists of Fijians and Tongans, along with some Americans.

== See also ==
- Marshall Islands national rugby union team
