= Public holidays in the Federated States of Micronesia =

This is a list of public holidays in the Federated States of Micronesia.

Date	Name	Chuuk	Kosrae	Pohnpei	Yap	Source
January 1	New Year's Day	Yes	Yes	Yes	Yes	
January 11	Constitution Day (Kosrae)	No	Yes	No	No	
March 1-2	Yap Day (Yap)	No	No	No	Yes	
March 31	Culture Day	Yes	Yes	Yes	Yes	
March–April	Good Friday	Yes	No	Yes	No	
May 10	Constitution Day	Yes	Yes	Yes	Yes	
August 21	Gospel Day	No	Yes	No	No	
September 8	Liberation Day (Kosrae)	No	Yes	No	No	
September 11	Liberation Day (Pohnpei)	No	No	Yes	No	
October 1	Constitution Day (Chuuk)	Yes	No	No	No	
Second Friday in October	Teachers' Appreciation Day	Yes	No	No	No	
October 24	United Nations Day	Yes	Yes	Yes	Yes	
November 1	Satowan Day	Yes	No	No	No	
November 3	Independence Day	Yes	Yes	Yes	Yes	
November 8	Constitution Day (Pohnpei)	No	No	Yes	No	
November 11	Veterans Day	Yes	Yes	Yes	Yes	
November 23	Presidents Day	Yes	Yes	Yes	Yes	
Fourth Thursday in November	Thanksgiving	No	Yes	No	No	
December 24	Constitution Day (Yap)	No	No	No	Yes	
December 25	Christmas Day	Yes	Yes	Yes	Yes	
TOTAL		11	11	10	9	
