= Ruu =

Village in Estonia

Coordinates: 59°27′N 25°12′E

- Village
- Interactive map of Ruu
- Country: Estonia
- County: Harju County
- Parish: Jõelähtme Parish
- Time zone: UTC+2 (EET)
  - Summer (DST): UTC+3 (EEST)

Ruu is a village in Jõelähtme Parish, Harju County in northern Estonia.

== Gallery ==
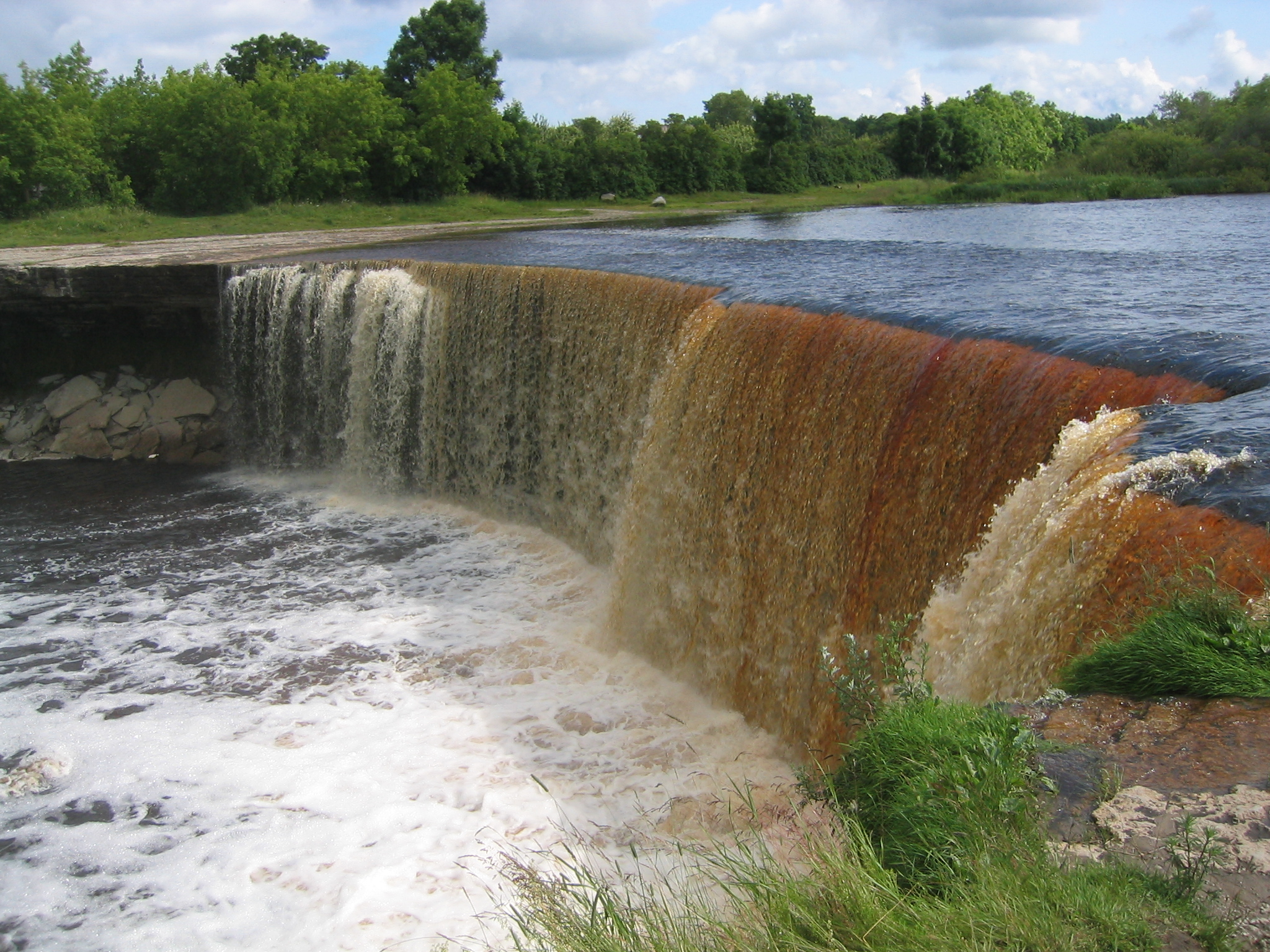
Jägala Falls on the Jägala River

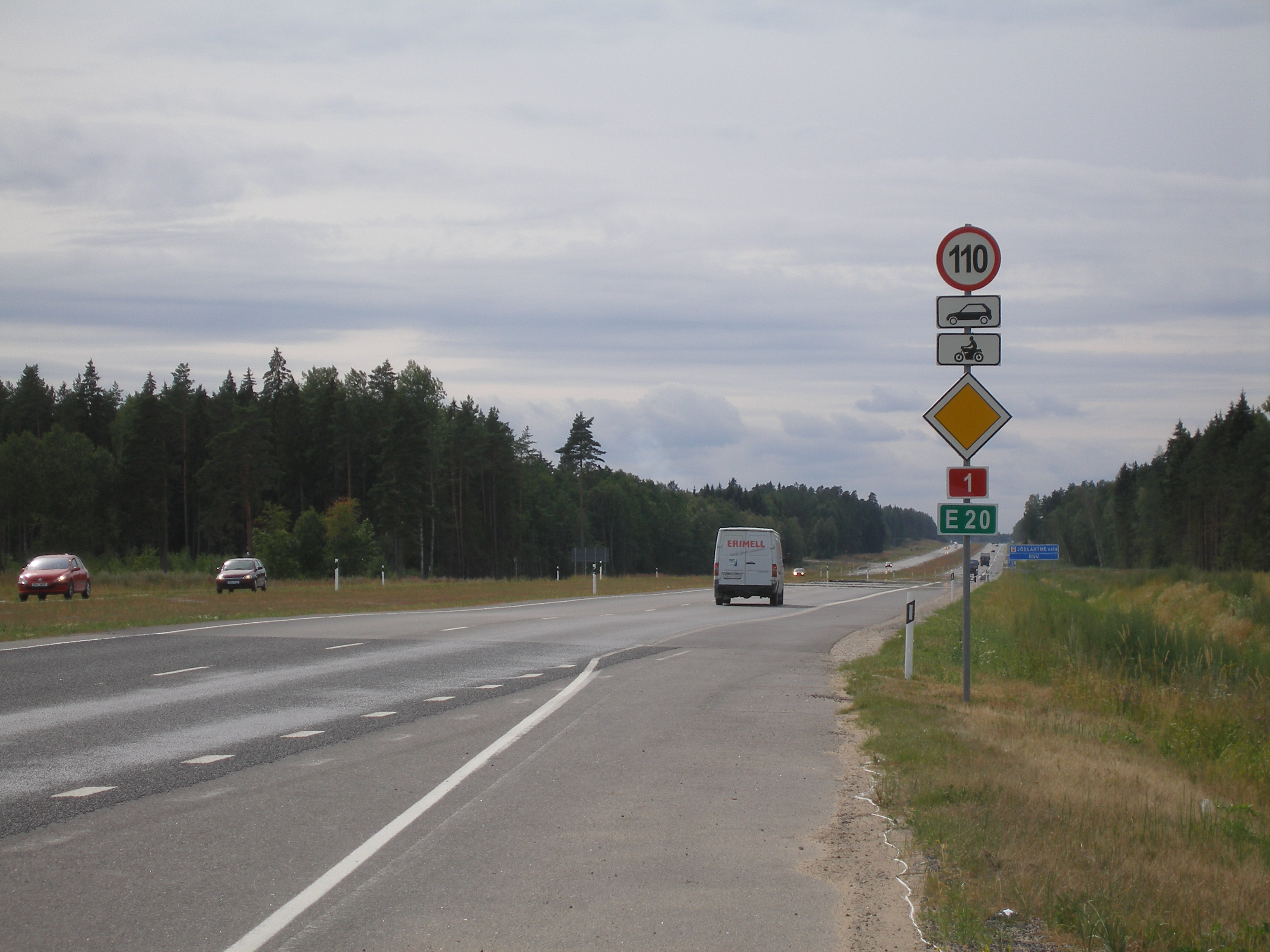
Tallinn–Narva road (part of European route E20) entering to the territory of Ruu village
