= Health in the Federated States of Micronesia =

Prevalence of obesity in the adult population, top countries (2016), Micronesia has the eighth highest rate in the world.

The Human Rights Measurement Initiative finds that the Federated States of Micronesia are fulfilling 94.9% of what it should be fulfilling for the right to health based on its level of income. When looking at the right to health with respect to children, the Federated States of Micronesia achieve 97.1% of what is expected based on their current income. In regards to the right to health amongst the adult population, the country achieves only 91.9% of what is expected based on the nation's level of income. The Federated States of Micronesia fall into the "good" category when evaluating the right to reproductive health because the nation is fulfilling only 95.8% of what the nation is expected to achieve based on the resources (income) it has available.

Life expectancy at birth in the Federated States of Micronesia was 66 for men and 69 for women in 2018.

Pingelap in Pohnpei State is notable for the prevalence of an extreme form of color blindness called achromatopsia, and known locally as maskun. Approximately 5% of the atoll's 3000 inhabitants are afflicted.

== History ==
=== 19th century: Devastating epidemics ===
The sanitary conditions prior to initial contact with the West are unknown. At the time of the Europeans' arrival in the Pacific Ocean, the Micronesian populations had reached demographic equilibrium.

In the first half of the 19th century, increased contact led to a demographic decline. The indigenous people were exposed to new bacteria and viruses from whalers, traders, settlers, and missionaries. Added to the devastating effects of these diseases was alcohol dependence, a substance discovered by the Micronesians. These various factors had a devastating effect on island communities, whose social customs, lifestyle practices, and ideas about disease made the spread of disease inevitable. A few missionaries, who were trained doctors, provided medical care.

From the 1840s to late 19th century, the island of Pohnpei was affected by numerous epidemics of influenza (1843, 1856, 1871, 1874, and 1879) and measles (1861 and 1894). Tuberculosis and dysentery were also common causes of death there. In 1854, a smallpox epidemic, triggered by the American whaling ship Delta, which brought two sick people and a corpse to the island, decimated the island, which lost about 40% of its population, or 4,000 people, despite the efforts of a missionary and an American doctor who practiced variolation on hundreds of natives. However, the most affected place was Kosrae, where 90% of the population disappeared between 1838 and 1890, leaving only 300 people. In Pohnpei and Kosrae, smallpox was common, as were sexually transmitted diseases, which sometimes reduced births to almost zero, contributing to the decline in population. The Yap Islands and the Truk Islands were much less affected, although influenza arrived in the Yap Islands in 1843 and 1863, brought each time by the same British trader. The Yap Islands were not often visited by ships until a flourishing copra trade began in the 1870s, while the Truk Islands did not become a port of call and place of residence for company agents until the end of the century.

=== Arrival of Western medicine in the first half of the 20th century ===
==== German efforts ====
In 1887, the Spanish built an infirmary in their colony of Pohnpei, but it was inaccessible to Micronesians. At the turn of the century, Germany acquired the Caroline Islands, where the current Federated States of Micronesia are located. It assigned doctors to the Yap Islands and Pohnpei and sent medical personnel to other islands for short periods. A 40-bed hospital opened in 1903 on the Yap Islands, and in 1913, the German administration proposed opening another one on the Truk Islands, but the Japanese annexation the following year prevented this. At the beginning of the 20th century, alcohol consumption was prohibited and remained so until 1959-1960.

In order to reduce the spread of infectious diseases by foreign crews, quarantine measures were implemented in certain districts. Regular vaccination was also introduced, and by 1907, the western part of the Caroline Islands, comprising the present-day states of Yap and Pohnpei, was almost immune to smallpox. During German colonization, physician Robert Koch identified pian as the cause of disfigurements and bodily lesions previously attributed to syphilis and highlighted the prevalence of respiratory diseases, ranging from whooping cough to tuberculosis.

During the German era, the population of the Yap Islands declined rapidly, falling from 7,400 to 6,200 inhabitants during the first decade of the 20th century. In 1907 and then in 1908-1909, dysentery epidemics killed a total of 700 people, and in 1910, influenza claimed many victims. In addition, the birth rate was low, which the authorities attributed to the spread of gonorrhea and the widespread practice of abortion. In an attempt to counter this decline, the German administration sought to prevent prostitutes from boarding ships and infected sailors from going ashore. Similarly, it attempted to prevent the practice of bringing girls from other villages to serve as hostesses (mispil) in the men's houses.

==== Japanese health policy ====
After the arrival of the Japanese at the end of 1914, whose occupation was legalized by the mandate of the South Seas Mandate in 1919, the population of the indigenous peoples, after having fallen sharply, now stagnated, except in the district of Yap, where it continued to decline due to tuberculosis, an unidentified respiratory problem causing inflammation, infantile diarrhea, and gonorrhea, which prevented births.

Births and deaths 1925–1930
	Births	Birth rate	Deaths	Death rate
Yap	99	14.4	303	44.1
Chuuk	358	23.8	372	24.1
Pohnpei	199	25.5	169	21.7

During the Japanese occupation, the normal workload of hospitals and clinics consisted of treating intestinal parasites (nearly 90% of the population was affected by roundworms and half by hookworms), respiratory disorders and skin diseases (90% of the population was affected by yaws).

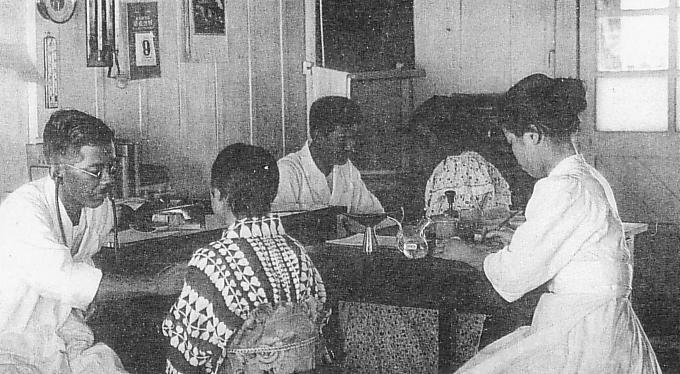
Interior of Truk district hospital around 1930.

In February 1915, the Japanese naval authorities authorized garrison doctors to provide free medical treatment to local populations and Japanese civilians. A small hospital was established in each naval district headquarters, and efforts were made to improve sanitation and personal hygiene among the Micronesians. The transfer of power to civilian authorities in 1922 was accompanied by the creation of government hospitals on Yap Island, Truk Island, Pohnpei, and later Kosrae. Compulsory vaccination programs were carried out even on remote islands, and some indigenous women received paramedical training. Leper colony and 50-bed tuberculosis sanatorium established on Yap in 1935. A leper colony was established on the Yap Islands to cope with the increase in cases, and in 1935, a 50-bed sanatorium was established to isolate tuberculosis patients. Epidemics still occurred but were gradually brought under control. Subsidized models of healthier houses, i.e., brighter, better ventilated, and less vulnerable to bad weather than traditional buildings, were proposed. On the larger islands, public baths and latrines were established and access to drinking water was provided. However, according to Mark R. Peattie, the Japanese public health program is a failure due to insufficient funding for the actions taken. In the Yap Islands, Japan's actions are rejected, perceived as an attempt to abolish customs.

==== Early American health policy ====
World War II military actions caused few deaths. Whereas until then the community had been primarily responsible for providing healthcare, with the American presence formalized by the creation of the Trust Territory of the Pacific Islands, it is now the government. When the United States moved in, the islanders were generally in poor health, even though they had recovered well from the immediate post-war period. By the late 1940s, the birth rate was rising, the death rate was falling, and life expectancy was increasing.

In 1965, WHO was severely criticized by the World Health Organization for the poor quality of its public health services. The WHO pointed to a lack of coordination in planning, budgeting, and overall supervision of health issues, the absence of a health action plan, a prevalence of diseases resulting from poor hygiene, outdated or dilapidated medical equipment, under-equipped hospitals, and often insufficiently trained staff.

Under pressure from negative UN reports on land management, the United States significantly increased the health budget, among other things. US legislation on health planning was extended to the Federated States of Micronesia. The US administration hired and supervised local doctors and paid all the bills. In the 1980s, a conglomerate of federal and international programs is made available to Micronesian governments. One of these, called the Medical Referral Program, allows patients to be sent to the Tripler Army Medical Center in Hawaii. Larger, more modern hospitals are built.

Smallpox was quickly eradicated thanks to penicillin, and oral medication was provided to treat intestinal parasites. Pulmonary tuberculosis, which affected 5% of the population of the Yap Islands, which were particularly hard hit, was combated from 1960 onwards through a vaccination program. All district hospitals had special rooms to isolate victims. The constant spitting of betel nuts may have contributed to the spread of the disease on the Yap Islands. In Chuuk State, a measles epidemic caused a few deaths in the mid-1960s, but epidemics remain rare.

=== New diseases with changing living conditions ===
==== Consequences of improved living standards ====
During the 1960s, US subsidies and the population grew, and wealth increased due to the rise in employment. Between 1962 and 1977, per capita income tripled. Imported foodstuffs, once prohibitively expensive, were now affordable for many Micronesians. The purchase of motorized land and sea vehicles led to a decline in physical activity.

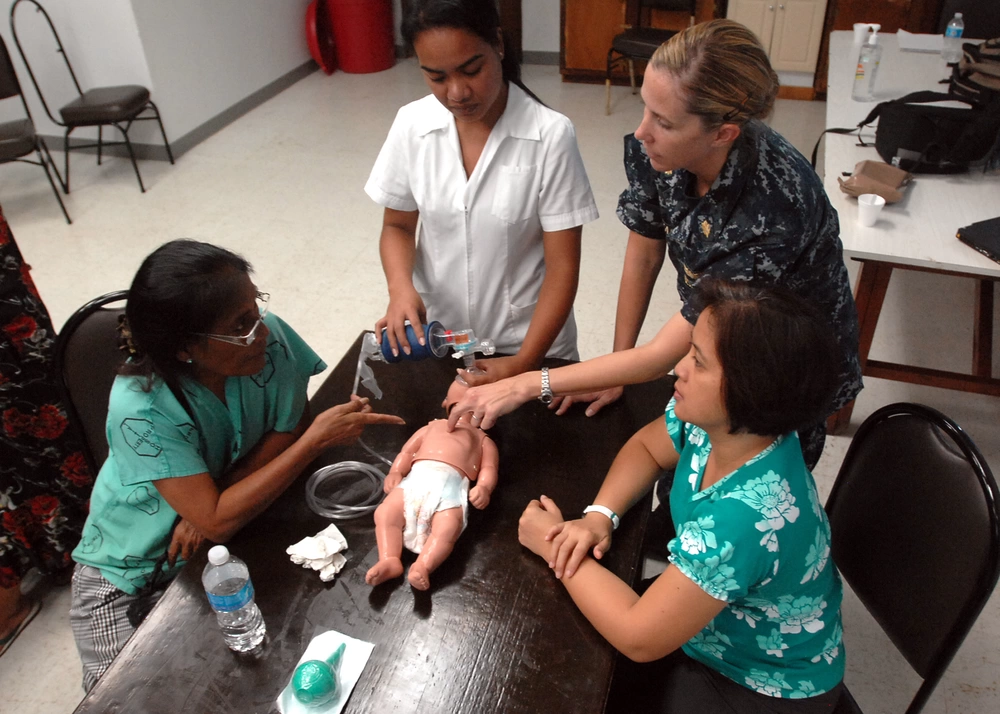
U.S. lieutenant demonstrating neonatal resuscitation during Pacific Partnership 2011 at Pohnpei State Department of Health Services.

The introduction of baby bottles and powdered milk allows many women to circumvent prohibitions on sexual relations during breastfeeding. Powdered milk is also perceived as a sign of distinction because of its cost. In addition, many mothers who have found government jobs, tired, entrust their children to relatives, usually elderly or very young, who cannot always serve as nannies. These people have no experience in using bottles (sterilization, boiling water) and may have poor hygiene practices. In addition, to make the formula last longer, the doses may be reduced or diluted with Kool-Aid or other beverages. For weaned children, healthy traditional foods are replaced by white rice or junk food, and the nutritional values of store-bought foods are unknown. This change in diet leads to vitamin A deficiencies, particularly in Chuuk State, to a lesser extent in Pohnpei and Kosrae States, and more generally to child malnutrition. Thus, breastfeeding, which was once highly valued and still widely practiced on the islands after World War II, was adopted by only a minority in many places in the early 1970s. Since the early 1990s, this practice has been making a comeback, but between 1991 and 1996, a quarter of child deaths in Chuuk State were still attributable to malnutrition.

While infants are smaller, adults are larger as a result of a diet rich in sodium and fat, supplemented by less nutritious carbohydrates such as white rice, and alcohol consumption, the ban on which was lifted in 1959-1960. In addition, Micronesians retain attitudes that encourage consumption, inherited from a past when food availability was more uncertain due to climatic hazards. As a result, non-communicable diseases are on the rise, a trend that may be exacerbated by a genetic component. Cases of diabetes rose from 8 per approximately 39,000 inhabitants in 1956 to 522 per approximately 74,000 inhabitants in 1976, while heart disease rose from 192 to 1,494 during the same period. Strokes, kidney failure, and limb amputations are on the rise. In 1994, approximately 80% of citizens aged 35 to 54 were overweight, and life expectancy was 65 years. Between 1991 and 1996, diabetes, hypertension, and stroke accounted for 46% of all deaths among people aged 5 and older, and cancer accounted for 17%. Between 1990 and 2003, seven out of ten people died from noncommunicable diseases. At the end of the 2000s, between one-third and one-half of deaths in the states of Yap and Pohnpei were due to chronic or related diseases (heart disease, diabetes, cancer, stroke), and between one-quarter and one-fifth in the state of Chuuk. The rate is unknown for the state of Kosrae.

==== Influence of societal modernization ====
From the late 1960s onwards, the suicide rate among young men rose sharply across Micronesia, undoubtedly due to the cultural changes affecting society as a result of modernization. A Mental Health Division was created in 1969 and set up training programs for indigenous staff. However, it did not receive sufficient funding to meet needs. In addition, political, clan, and family alliances affected the effectiveness of the work of coordinating physicians. Finally, traditional medical practices in the field of health were not adopted by medical administrators.

==== Rare epidemics ====
At the end of the 20th century and the beginning of the 21st century, epidemics became rare and had little or no fatality rate. In 1982-1983, a cholera epidemic struck Chuuk State. An epidemic of Zika virus disease, detected for the first time outside Africa and Asia, struck the Yap Islands in 2007. Between two-thirds and three-quarters of the population, generally asymptomatic, was affected. It did not result in any hospitalizations. The Yap Islands were affected by Chikungunya between August 2013 and August 2014, but no deaths were recorded. Dengue fever occurs sporadically in the country.

== Health system ==
=== Funding ===
In 1979, the health budgets of the Trust Territory of the Pacific Islands were significantly reduced by the United States in anticipation of independence, which was achieved in 1986. The young nation was then faced with the cost of the health system set up by the Americans, which it could not afford due to a lack of sufficient funds. The states' healthcare systems were forced to restructure in order to reduce costs—seventeen of the twenty-five clinics in the state of Pohnpei and all three in the state of Kosrae were closed—and avoid transferring patients abroad. Yap succeeded. A program providing care for Micronesians in American hospitals (Medical Referral Program), supported financially and technically by the United States, was nevertheless maintained thanks to the a Compact of Free Association.

Since 1990, the governments of the four states of the federation have had full legal responsibility for health-related matters, which was in fact already the case previously, and most medical health laws fall under state jurisdiction. Neither the constitution of the Federated States of Micronesia nor those of the states provide for a right to health, even though they require the provision or promotion of health services. Healthcare in the country is generally free and provided by the government of each state. Micronesians consider it normal for the government to pay the bill and do not expect to pay. From the mid-1950s until at least 1995, a fee of only 10 cents was charged for each visit to the clinic. Healthcare facilities and services are funded by redistributing funds collected by the federal government from the United States to the states. Federal government directly funds the national health insurance system.

In 2019, 68% of the health budget was directly funded by the Compact of Free Association, and 27% by grants from the Department of Health and Human Services. Only 5% came from local revenues. Funding external-dependent, yet federal surpluses ($26.6 million in 2016). Healthcare funding in the Federated States of Micronesia is dependent on external funding, but at the same time, the federal government generates surpluses ($26.6 million in 2016). The race for subsidies sometimes comes at the expense of local healthcare priorities.

=== Health insurance systems ===
A national health insurance program for employees of the government of the Federated States of Micronesia came into effect in 1984. It provides benefits for healthcare services, including diagnosis, treatment, surgery, and hospitalization. In 1990, Congress expanded eligibility to all state government employees, employees of other agencies, and their household members or dependents. Four years later, coverage was extended to all public and private sector employees and their dependents, and then in 2006 to students attending post-secondary institutions within the country. This health insurance, known as MiCare, consists of three options. The basic option covers locally provided health care services and medical treatment, while the next level up also includes referral to a health care facility outside the home island. The most expensive option is only available to staff and their dependents who are employed in government offices outside the country.

A 1994 Chuuk State law established an independent health insurance scheme. All residents working in Chuuk State and their dependents are eligible to enroll. They receive basic benefits from Chuuk State Hospital. Enrollees are also eligible for medical care off the island at selected providers in the Philippines.

Health insurance systems and enrollment 2010
		Yap	Chuuk	Pohnpei	Kosrae
Federal system	Enrollees and dependents	550	?	12,939	2,525
Federal system	% population	5%	?	36%	38%
Chuuk State system	Enrollees and dependents	/	12,932	/	/
Chuuk State system	% population	/	27%	/	/

=== Traditional medicine ===
Before the introduction of conventional medicine, and even today outside of state medical facilities, treatments are administered and medicines are dispensed using numerous plants. Unlike in the past, treatments are often no longer accompanied by magical practices such as songs, charms, and spells. In the state of Pohnpei, the law prohibits the use of traditional medicinal practices in public health facilities, although they are still practiced within families or by herbalists, sorcerers, masseurs, diviners, midwives, and magic specialists.

=== Conventional medicine ===
Medical staff are partly made up of contract workers from the United States who have been trained abroad. There is a very small program for staff in Yap State in the Yap Islands, and the College of Micronesia-FSM in Pohnpei launched a nursing program in the fall of 2011. However, most people have studied abroad, usually at the University of Guam, the University of Hawaii, or the College of the Marshall Islands in Majuro.

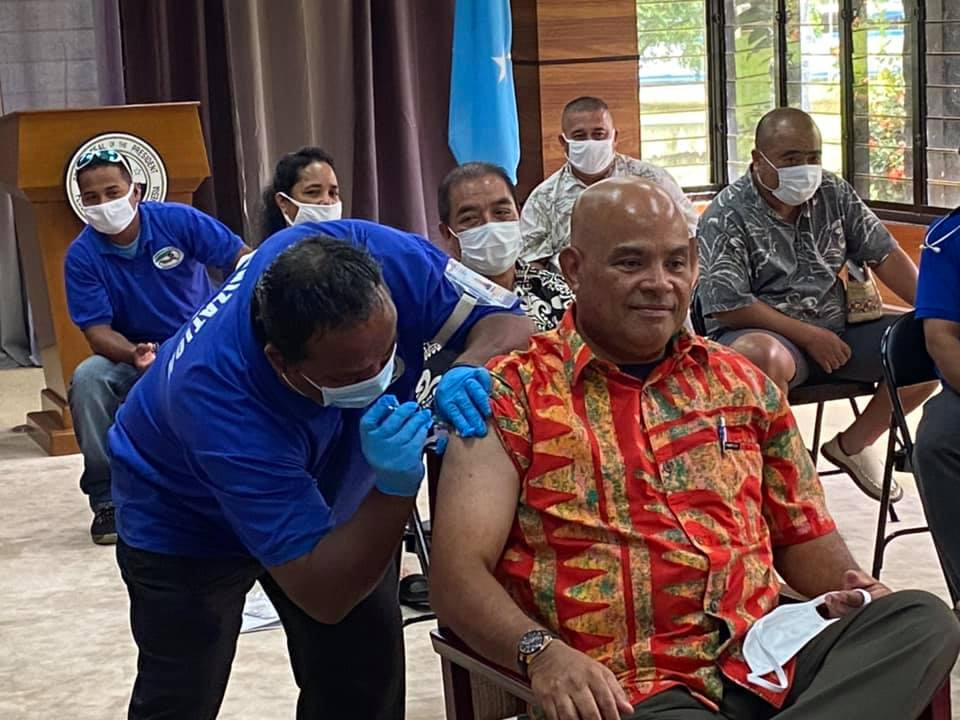
COVID-19 vaccination of FSM President David W. Panuelo.

State governments own most health facilities. There is one state hospital on Weno Island in Chuuk State, another in Tofol in the municipality of Lelu in Kosrae State, a third in Colonia on the Yap Islands in Yap State, and a fourth in Kolonia on Pohnpei Island in Pohnpei State. There are only three private hospitals on the island of Pohnpei and one on the island of Weno. There are just under 100 public health clinics throughout the country. However, patients may face under-equipment and a lack of staff expertise for certain conditions. In addition, the urban location of hospitals can make them difficult to access for people living in rural areas or on other islands, due to tides or weather conditions. Each of the four states of the federation receives approximately $100,000 per year under the Medical Referral Program funded by the Compact of Free Association to finance care abroad (in Guam, Hawaii, and the Philippines) that cannot be provided in the Federated States of Micronesia. Not all requests can be met, and sometimes only two to three patients per state can benefit based on their financial circumstances. Some patients do not hesitate to go abroad to obtain what they consider to be better quality care.

The healthcare system is considered adequate for providing care, but the geographical isolation of the islands makes it difficult to obtain and store supplies. Thus, without easy access to Columbia blood agar or sheep blood, laboratories use obsolete human blood, but this type of culture is not recommended for differentiating the hemolytic profiles of streptococci.

The Federated States of Micronesia has no mental health care centers, psychiatrists, or psychologists. In general, few resources are allocated to the treatment of mental illness in the Pacific Islands. Furthermore, care within the family or traditional medicine perpetuates misconceptions. Mental illness is widely perceived as the result of ancestral or supernatural spirits, sometimes due to wrongdoing or moral transgression, which only magical practices can remove. However, conventional healthcare providers are fully trained to provide mental health services. Beds allocated to mental health are often attached to regular services, but when a closed environment is necessary, prison cells are used as a last resort. In 2007, the Pacific Islands Mental Health Network (PIMHnet) was created, of which the Federated States of Micronesia is a member, to assist in the development of mental health care.

== Healthcare ==
=== Health indicators ===
According to the UN, in 2019, the infant mortality rate per thousand live births is estimated at 21.8 for women and 27.2 for men. Life expectancy at birth is 66.2 years for men and 69.6 years for women, with healthy life expectancy at 54.4 years for men and 57.8 years for women.

Total health expenditure in the country was $473 per capita in 2014. This represents approximately 13.7% of GDP.

=== Pathologies ===
Initial contact with European populations led to an explosion in mortality due to communicable diseases that Micronesians had not previously encountered. The prevalence of these diseases is gradually declining, although it remains high. However, with the westernization of lifestyles, populations are prone to the development of new, non-communicable diseases. The Federated States of Micronesia is therefore affected by the morbidity patterns of both a developing and a developed country.

==== Communicable diseases ====
Most hospitalizations are caused by waterborne and foodborne diseases. Many Micronesians are also affected by group A streptococcus, which can lead to acute rheumatic fever. When the disease has progressed to the point of causing rheumatic heart disease, patients must leave the country to find adequate treatment, which is very expensive. Highest The country has the highest rate of Hansen's disease (leprosy) in the Western Pacific, as well as a high rate of tuberculosis, which is present on all the islands. Twenty-one cases of multidrug-resistant tuberculosis were detected in Chuuk State in 2008 and treated with international assistance. Their emergence is attributed to a breakdown in directly observed therapy and a lack of staff. Periodic outbreaks of Zika virus in Yap State, dengue fever, and hepatitis A have been observed. The number of HIV infections is very low, but discussion of sex is taboo and condom use is low, which could lead to an increase in infection. The number of vaccine-preventable diseases has fallen significantly, while vaccination of children against measles, hepatitis B, whooping cough, polio, and mumps has been very successful.

==== Non-communicable diseases ====
The main health problems encountered in the early 2000s are chronic diseases such as high blood pressure, diabetes, and cancer.

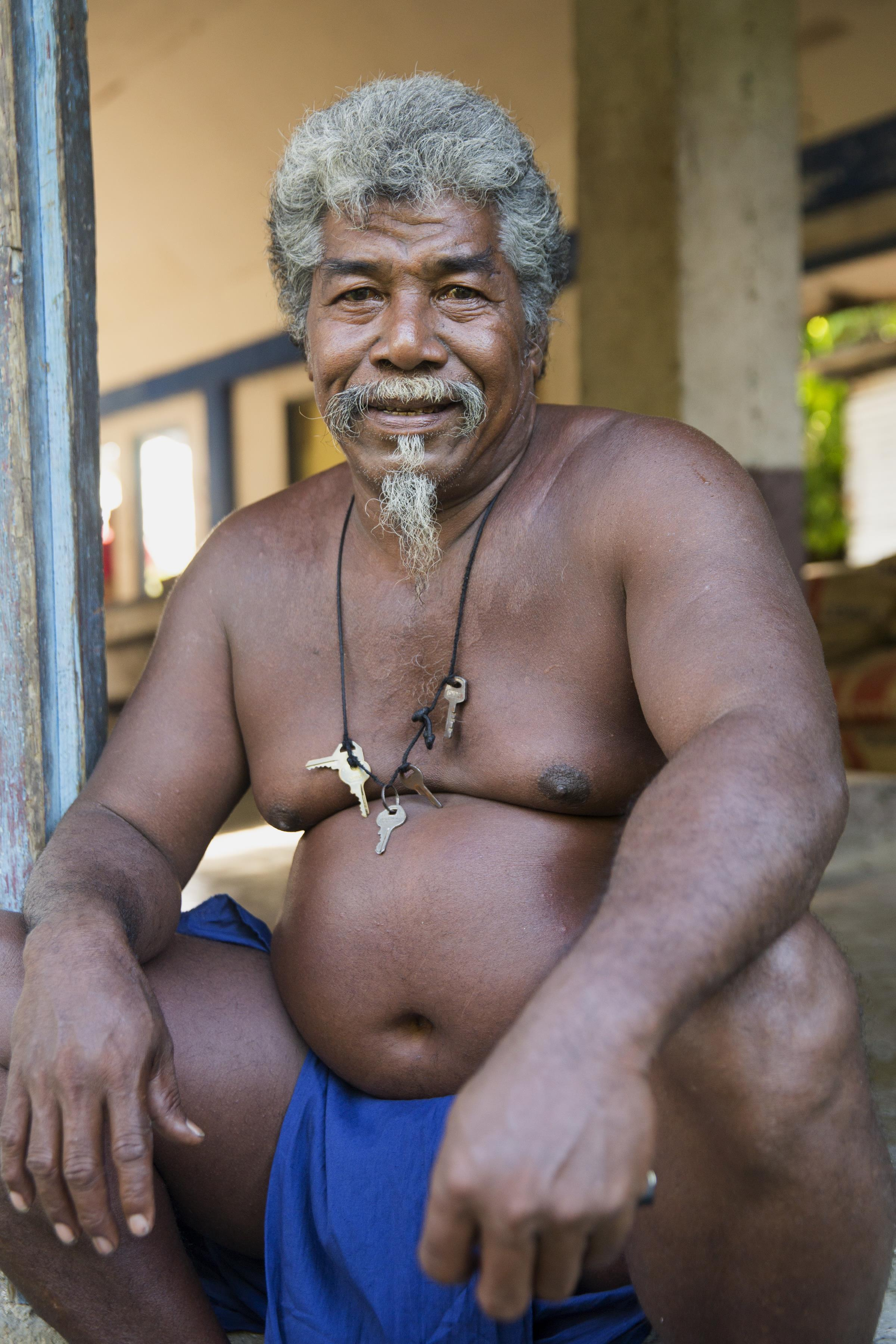
Villager from Fais Island overweight.

A 2002 World Health Organization survey revealed that 82.7% of women and 63.9% of men are overweight (body mass index ≥ 25), and that 55.8% of women and 30.0% of men are obese (BMI ≥ 30). A 2008 survey in the state of Pohnpei showed that 32.8% of the adult population aged 25 to 64 has type 2 diabetes. The main cause is attributed to the change in the local diet from a traditional diet based on local foods (breadfruit, taro, bananas, local fish, and seafood) to a more Westernized diet based on wheat, flour, white rice, sugar, alcohol, and fatty canned meats such as corned beef, which are sometimes cheaper but above all require less effort to prepare. There is also a mistaken belief that imported foods are superior to local foods. Purchasing them requires money and is therefore a sign of prestige. Lack of exercise, gender, and age are other contributing factors. Young people are therefore much more affected. Populations not living in or near state capitals are much less affected because they maintain traditional eating habits, cook food without fat, and engage in traditional physical activities.

In the states of Chuuk, Pohnpei, and Yap, the most common causes of cancer-related deaths are lung, ovarian, cervical, breast, and prostate cancer. Oral cancer, caused by the combined consumption of betel nuts and tobacco, is common in the state of Yap. Betel nut can also be combined with powdered lime or betel leaf. In 2017, 93.5% of children aged 2 to 8 in Yap State consumed it daily and continued to do so for an average of 20 years. The figure is 50% in Pohnpei State and just over 10% and 20% in Kosrae and Chuuk States. In these three states, consumption is not traditional and has only been growing for one to two decades. In Yap State, the exchange of betel nuts, tobacco, and alcohol is central to traditional practices, such as paying homage to a chief, which encourage consumption. Aware of this issue, the Tamol Council has ordered government agencies to stop providing these products during traditional tributes to chiefs. Unlike the other states, Kosrae is not particularly affected by cancer. However, according to Micronesian medical staff, cancer mortality rates in the states may be underreported due to limitations in the cancer control infrastructure (lack of human resources and laboratories, absence of centralized registries, difficulties in transmitting records, etc.).

==== Hereditary diseases ====
The Pingelap Atoll in the state of Pohnpei is notable for the prevalence of an extreme form of color blindness (achromatopsia), known locally as maskun. Approximately 5% of the atoll's 3,000 inhabitants are affected.

==== Mental health ====
The suicide rate among young Micronesian men is one of the highest in the world. Suicide is an extreme manifestation of mental suffering, but it is not always linked to mental illness, even though people with mental disorders are more likely to resort to it. Micronesian cultures, for example, suicide is a way of avoiding confrontation in serious interpersonal conflicts.

Mental disorders existed before the colonial period, but their incidence and severity increased with colonization, capitalism, and urbanization. Changes in family structures and roles intensified intergenerational conflicts, while traditional structures for resolving tensions became obsolete. There is a significant difference between men and women. This is explained by the fact that women's domestic role is considered more protective, while men are subject to greater social pressure, have less support, and are most affected by change. They are also more likely to seek solace in substance abuse, such as alcohol. The most affected Micronesian regions are those located furthest to the west, which are most affected by modernization.

== Bibliography ==
- Leckie, Jacqueline; Hughes, Frances (2017). "Mental Health in the Smaller Pacific States". In Minas, Harry; Lewis, Milton (eds.). Mental Health in Asia and the Pacific: Historical and Cultural Perspectives. New York: Springer. ISBN 978-1-4899-7997-1.
- Peattie, Mark R. (1988). Nan'yo: The Rise and Fall of the Japanese in Micronesia (1885–1945). Honolulu: University of Hawaii Press.
- MacNaughton, Neil; Jones, Melissa L. (2013). "Health Concerns of Micronesian Peoples". Journal of Transcultural Nursing. 24 (3): 305–312. doi:10.1177/1043659613481675. PMID 23576003.
- Rubinstein, Donald H. (1999). "Staking Ground: Medical Anthropology, Health, and Medical Services in Micronesia". In Kiste, Robert C.; Marshall, Mac (eds.). American Anthropology in Micronesia, An Assessment. Hawaii: University of Hawaiʻi Press. ISBN 978-0-8248-2017-6.
