= Human trafficking in the Federated States of Micronesia =

In 2010, the Federated States of Micronesia (FSM) was a source country for women subjected to trafficking in persons, specifically forced prostitution in the United States and the U.S. territory of Guam, and was reportedly a destination for women from China forced into commercial sexual exploitation. The FSM may have been a destination country for a few men and women from other Pacific nations who were subjected to conditions of forced labor. Micronesian sex trafficking victims from the state of Chuuk have been identified in Guam and the United States. In one case, 10 young women from the state of Chuuk were lured to Guam by a Micronesian recruiter with promises of well-paying jobs in the service and hospitality sectors. Upon arrival in Guam, the women were forced to engage in prostitution. A physically and mentally disabled young woman from Chuuk was rescued from forced prostitution in Hawaii during 2009.

Very little data on human trafficking in FSM was available as the government made no effort to proactively identify victims despite its history as a source country for victims. The government had not conducted any inquiries, investigations, studies, or surveys on human trafficking.

In 2010 the Government of the Federated States of Micronesia did not fully comply with the minimum standards for the elimination of trafficking, however it is making significant efforts to do so. In 2009, the government made no discernible efforts to proactively identify victims, prevent future trafficking incidents by educating the public about the dangers of trafficking, or investigate and prosecute suspected trafficking offenses; the Federated States of Micronesia was therefore placed on the Tier 2 Watch List for the second consecutive year. The government did, however, provide some police and immigration officials with trafficking awareness training. The country was placed at Tier 2 in 2023.

The country ratified the 2000 UN TIP Protocol in November 2011.

In 2023, the Organized Crime Index noted that the country had limited support for victims.

== Prosecution (2010) ==
The Government of the Federated States of Micronesia made no discernible progress in its anti-trafficking law enforcement efforts. The government did not take steps to investigate, prosecute or punish any suspected trafficking offenders during the reporting period. The FSM national police would have jurisdiction over transnational trafficking crimes, although no specific or comprehensive federal laws prohibit forms of human trafficking such as slavery, forced labor, or forced prostitution. Each of the four states could prosecute trafficking offenses under related laws. Penalties for trafficking offenses under these laws range from five to 10 years’ imprisonment and are sufficiently stringent. Officials received no reports of trafficking cases during this reporting period. The Police Academy featured training on recognizing trafficking victims, as well as the difference between human trafficking and alien smuggling. The academy also discussed trafficking interdiction techniques. No formal plan to act on the training is currently in place. A foreign government provided anti-trafficking training to the Transnational Crime Unit (TCU) as part of its overall support of the TCU's activities. The TCU, part of the Pacific Transnational Crime network, remained the main conduit for general law enforcement information coming from international sources. Law enforcement agencies operated under significant resource, personnel, and capacity constraints. There was no evidence of official complicity in trafficking crimes, or of government involvement in or tolerance of trafficking on a local or institutional level.

== Protection (2010) ==
During the reporting period, the government made no apparent efforts to proactively identify potential trafficking victims, and did not take steps to develop or implement formal or informal procedures to refer identified or suspected trafficking victims for appropriate services. During the year, FSM officials did not receive reports from other sources of any trafficking victims within the country's borders, and did not, to their knowledge, provide services to any victims of trafficking. Identified or suspected trafficking victims would have access to the very limited social services and legal assistance provided by government agencies to any victim of crime. No NGOs knowingly provided services to any victims of trafficking crimes independently or in cooperation with the government. FSM has no laws specifically protecting trafficking victims or witnesses. While no specific civil remedy for trafficking victims is spelled out in the state or national codes, each state's code does provide general redress for personal injuries caused by another. Victims may bring personal injury civil suits against traffickers, although no suits have ever been filed. The law did not provide specific legal alternatives to the removal of foreign victims to countries where they faced hardship or retribution. Judges, however, have the discretion to issue an order allowing any foreign victims of crime to remain in the country.

== Prevention (2010) ==
The government made minimal efforts to prevent trafficking or increase the public's awareness of trafficking risks in FSM and the region during the reporting period. Evidence and anecdotal reports suggest that the current number of internal or transnational trafficking victims is relatively low; the government's limited resources were thus often directed to meet more emergent priorities. Immigration authorities claim to look for evidence of trafficking at ports of entry. Upper-level managers at the Division of Immigration and Labor attended seminars that discussed trafficking. The government did initiate anti-trafficking training for new police recruits in the last two police academy classes. In May 2009, the former FSM Ambassador to the United States was convicted of selling sample FSM passports maintained at the Embassy in Washington D.C. for personal financial gain, and sentenced to 30 months’ imprisonment and a fine. Although authorities have not yet shown that the case clearly involved the transnational movement of trafficking victims, the former Ambassador was facilitating the illegal cross-border movement of irregular migrants from populations throughout the region that are consistently identified as trafficking victims. FSM supports no anti-trafficking task forces or working groups. The government conducted no campaigns aimed at reducing the demand for commercial sex acts. Micronesia is not a party to the 2000 UN TIP Protocol.
