= Yapese people =

Micronesian ethnic group

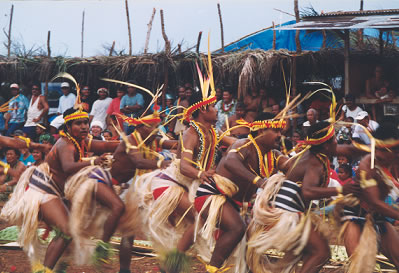
- Yapese men in traditional dress celebrating Yap Day

Total population
- c. 15,000

Regions with significant populations
- Federated States of Micronesia 13,400; Yap
- United States: 1,600

Languages
- Yapese, English

Religion
- Roman Catholic; Protestantism, Mormonism, other

Related ethnic groups
- Other Micronesians, Austronesians

The Yapese are a Micronesian ethnic group indigenous to the main island of Yap. Yapese culture is based on the maxims of respect and responsibility. Aspects of traditional Yapese culture are still important in modern Yapese culture.

== History ==
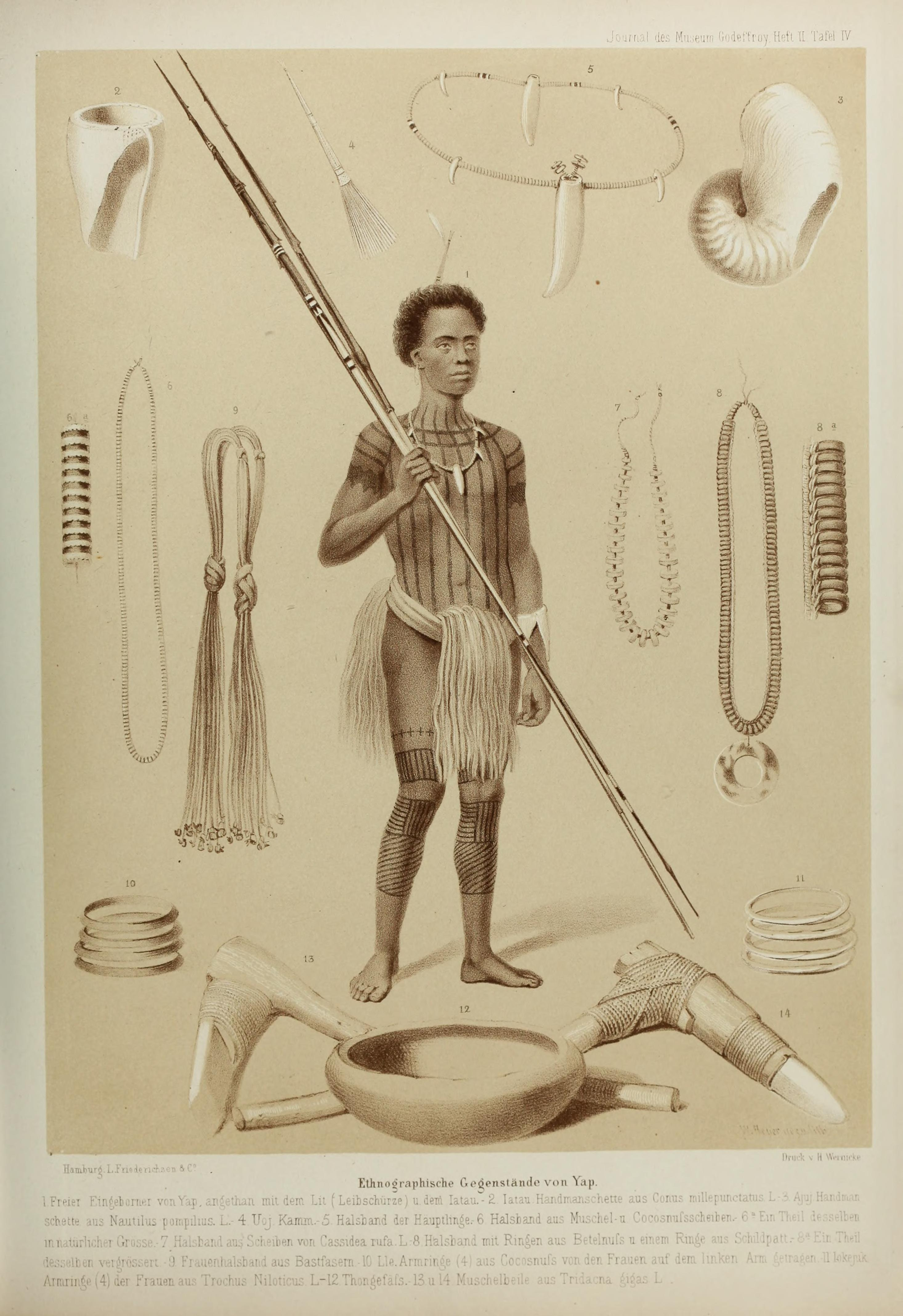
Yapese man, c. 1873

Before coming into contact with Europeans, the Yapese people were familiar with surrounding island groups. Yapese sailors traveled to Palau to quarry stones. Carolinian people visited Yap during times of crises. Spanish and German traders colonized Yap in 1885 and started converting the people to Christianity. The Japanese navy took control of Yap in 1914. After World War II, Yap became a part of the United States Trust Territory of the Pacific Islands. In 1978, Yap became a district in the Federated States of Micronesia.

Today, traditional Yapese culture is taught in elementary and junior high schools in the course "Practical Art/Culture". A survey conducted in 2010 showed significant interest in preserving and handing down traditional Yapese culture.

=== Demographics ===
Before World War II, Yap faced critical depopulation from contact with European diseases and cultural abortion. Antibiotics introduced after World War II caused a population explosion.

A 1994 census of Yap found that 48.1% of the people on Yap identified as Yapese. A 2000 census found that number changed to 49.1%. A 2010 survey reported that 5.7% of the population of the Federated States of Micronesia (FSM) were Yapese. A 2012 survey of Micronesians outside the FSM that there were 258 Yapese in the Northern Mariana Islands, 412 in Guam, 72 in Hawaii, and 865 in the contiguous United States.

== Entertainment ==
Yap traditionally has no instrumental music. Everything is human-made, like their local dances (which feature no instruments whatsoever), which is the "writing" of Yapese culture, and is passed down from generation to generation. Yapese traditional dance (churu’) is very formal and ritualistic. A Yapese dance is performed in a group and accompanied by instruments and chanting. The dance movements and chanting generally tell a story. Dances are often performed on special occasions such as Yap Day or during ritual exchanges (guyuwol). Traditional Yapese clothing is often worn during dances.

== Clothing ==
Traditional clothing on the main island of Yap includes loincloths and hibiscus fiber for the men and grass skirts for the women. This clothing is popular in remote villages and during festivals. Modern clothing is slowly replacing traditional clothing on these islands.

== Personal and family life ==
=== Households and land ===
Tabinaw is most commonly the Yapese household, which is generally composed of one's nuclear family. Each nuclear family generally has its own house and land. A long log divides the house into two sections; the back side (tabgul) is reserved for the father, and the front side (to’or) is open to any member of the family. Traditional households have cookhouses for different members of one's family, while modern households have a shared family cookhouse. Yapese houses are made out of lumber, corrugated metal, and concrete.

A Yapese estate includes several households living on land owned by a single house site. Men can join an estate by having their patrilineal name selected from a pool of ancestral names. Women can belong to the estate they were born on, or they can belong to the estate of their husband. Land is generally passed down from father to son or from older brother to younger brother. If a family does not have any sons, the oldest daughter can inherit the land. This land is separated by matrilineal kinship. Individuals and groups who have to rely on other people's lands are part of the serf caste.

=== Politics ===
A patriclan is a political and economic unit while a patrilineage is a social unit of kinsmen. Yapese clans or sibs (genung) are totemic and claim mythical ancestry and a mythical place of origin. Sib members are instructed not to eat the living counterpart of their mythical ancestress. Sibs are exogamous and consider each other as brothers and sisters. Each sib has a chief, and each village has a head chief who acts for all his sib mates. The village chief voices group consensus. Traditional villages have a council of elders which maintains social control through judicial means.

=== Kinship ===
David M. Schneider recorded Yapese belief on conception in the 1960s. He found that the Yapese did not view human pregnancy as a result of copulation, but rather as a bestowal from one's ancestors for good behavior. Support for this idea came from the observation that promiscuous Yapese women did become pregnant. Thomas Helmig disputed Schneider's conclusions regarding the link between coitus and pregnancy on Yap. Helmig cites Wilhelm Müller-Wismar's ethnographic research indicated that the Yapese concept of fatherhood began prenatally, much like their concept of motherhood.

Strong sexual taboos on Yap prohibit incest, which is viewed as one of the worst offences one can commit. Those who commit incest are likened to animals or cannibals.

== Food and agriculture ==
Yapese use local foods to express cultural values. Local foods bind the land and people together. Common food grown in Yap include taro, yams, breadfruit, bananas, and reef fish. Traditional agricultural systems on Yap include gardens, shifting cultivation, taro systems, and animal husbandry. Chewing betel nut, drinking palm wine, and consuming commercial alcohol are popular social activities on Yap. The United States gave large subsidies to Micronesia in the 20th century, creating a decline in local food production on Yap. Imported foods such as white rice, canned meat, and frozen meat became more popular.

Men generally work as fishermen while women generally work as farmers in taro patches. The protein from the men's work (thumag) and the starch from the women's work (ggaan) complement each other in the Yapese meal. Imported foods are generally adapted within this classification system; for example, canned meats are considered thumag and rice is considered ggaan.

Eating classes on Yap are composed of male non-serfs who eat together. New members of these eating classes must undergo an initiation ritual (dowach). Food is separately prepared for the men, the women and children, and the menstruating daughters. Boys over the age of ten live and eat in the village's young men's house and menstruating girls have to eat in a separate house. In the main house, older males eat separately from the women and younger children.

== See also ==
- Governor of Yap
- Rai stones
- Religion in Yap
- Rull Men's Meetinghouse
- Yapese language
- Traditional Councils in the Yap State
