= Music and dances of the Federated States of Micronesia =

The traditional music of the Federated States of Micronesia varies widely across the four states, and has, in recent times, evolved into popular music influenced by Europop, country music and reggae.

== Traditional dances ==
Traditional dances on the main islands includes "stick dancing" on Pohnpei, Chuuk and Yap, standing dances on Chuuk and sitting dances on Yap and Chuuk. The Yapese are particularly known for their skills in dancing. The Yapese stick dance is performed by men, women and children together, while standing dances are performed either by women or men and boys, but never both together. The men participate in various dancing competitions, which are segregated by caste; the lower castes have some distinct dances, such as a woman's standing dance, but can only dance when authorized by a person of a higher caste. Chuuk shares many of the similar dance styles with Yap because of similar cultural heritage with Chuuk and the outer islands of Yap. Chuuk's most mysterious and rarest dance is called the "Moonlight Dance", one of the few dances in which both men and women dance together. It can only happen during a full moon with permission of the village chief. Traditionally speaking, this was a way for young males and females to get together.
