= Religion in Yap =

Religious beliefs of the Island of Yap

Religion in Yap is predominantly Roman Catholic, which first arrived in Yap in the late 1880s. Before that, the Yapese people practiced traditional rituals and practices and held beliefs about the gods, the spirits, taboos, and death. Through the efforts of Capuchin and Jesuit missionaries, the Catholic Church eventually became the dominant church on Yap. Other religions on Yap include Protestantism and other Christian sects.

== Traditional religion ==
=== Gods and spirits ===
Yapese mythology shares many commonalities with Chuukic mythology, though the direction of diffusion is unknown.

The Yapese creation myth starts with the god Gavur li yel yel creating the four layers of cosmos, the dark unnamed tier where Gavur li yel yel resides, the sky layer, the earth, and the underworld beneath the sea. He used his hands and dirt to create the chief god Yanolop, who in turn used his mind (mam) to create five other sky deities, four male and one female. The female deity, Matsugulop, mates with the male deities and they create another generation of sky gods. Different accounts credit Gavur li yel yel or Yanolop for creating Solal, the god of the world-under-the-sea. Gavur li yel yel then creates five gods of the world-under-the-sea, four male and one female. Like the first generation of sky gods, the gods of the world-under-the-sea marry and inter-marry to create new generations of gods.

Yälfaath the Elder, a member of the first generation of sky gods, is regarded as the creator of the human race. He used his hands and dirt to create the first man and woman, named Ganan and Nik. He created another couple using the same method the next day, but then decided it would be faster to give the humans sexual organs to allow them to reproduce by themselves.

=== Human soul ===
Traditional Yapese belief holds that each living person has two souls; one that lives (yaan ni fos) and one that dies (yaan ni yam). At death, the soul-that-lives wanders the earth while the soul-that-dies gets eaten by the sky god Lug and a friend. A ritual prayer and incantation (ma’log) induces the soul to a place called Gatsam where it can stay or go to heaven.

Those who choose to go to heaven must first offer money to the guard Rumang and pass his judgment. They then enter into Yanolop's clubhouse, where Yanolop separates the spirits he considers "bad" (for example, those with disease, or women who die during childbirth) from those he considers "good". People of different classes go to different places in heaven. For example, the souls of warriors who die in battle, women who die during childbirth, and fishermen who die at sea all go to their own places in the afterlife.

=== Ritual calendar ===
The initiation into eating ranks in the district of Rull starts with the lunar month Monyibwuo. The next month, Wagaeygaey, the Yapese prepare by planting yam gardens. People from Rull spend the next month Tafgif cleaning their yards and graves. They also place food offerings on graves, which is later eaten by people of Gitam. Makan is a sacred month on Yap which starts with the disappearance of the constellation Pleiades. Eating class initiates spend this time in fasting, seclusion, and learning. The priests of Pemgoy and Alog gather at a shrine of Rull. For the month's last ten days, a magician divines for the eating class and its initiates by burning bundles of material. On the last month of this calendar, Rir, the initiates are welcomed as new members of the eating class. They then prepare a feast for visitors of the district who come from southern Yap.

=== Taboo system ===
Traditional Yapese religious beliefs emphasize a ritual of taboo which includes eating practices, female seclusion, and death customs.

==== Purity ====
In Yapese culture, the universe is viewed in semantic opposition of various elements and beings; such as the land vs. the sea, spirits vs. humans, or male vs. female. Since the land is viewed as the domain of the male spirits, women must maintain good relations with these spirits to grow food for their family. Similarly, the sea is viewed as the domain of the female spirits, so fishermen must maintain good relations with these spirits to achieve success.

Ritual purity (tabgul) is in opposition to profane impurity (ta’ay). People and things that are considered impure must be isolated from those that are considered pure to remove contamination. While the sea is pure, the land is impure, and the village is considered neutral, or the bridge between these two worlds. Spirits are considered pure, while humans are impure. Men are pure, and women are impure. The level of pureness can vary; for example, female spirits are purer than male spirits. Newborn children are considered very polluted and become less polluted as they grow up. When a girl reaches puberty and starts menstruating, she returns to her newborn polluted state until she stops menstruating during pregnancy.

==== Food ====
Eating customs include certain classes (yoogum) of male non-serfs who are supposed to eat together. Women and children who violate the taboo face punishment from the gods. New members of these eating classes must undergo an initiation ritual (dowach). Yoogum members hold a feast each year. Prepared food has to be distinguished between these classes, separated for the men, the women and children, and the menstruating daughters. Boys over the age of ten live and eat in the village's young men's house and menstruating girls have to eat in a separate house. In the main house, older males eat separately from the women and younger children.

Restrictions on food and cooking practices in modern Yap are followed by less than 30 percent of Yapese households.

==== Female seclusion ====
Young Yapese women are secluded during menstruation. During pregnancy, a tamaarong priest would routinely visit and pray for the expectant mother. The tamaarong would also assist the mother in giving birth by calling for the child to come out. Afterward, the mother and child would go to the menstruation hut and the father would take a rest holiday for as long as the tamaarong advised.

==== Death ====
Death customs among the Yapese focus on defilement of the living by proximity to the dead. After death in Yapese culture, the bodies are cleaned, rubbed with turmeric, and then the orifices are plugged. The next-of-kin stay with the body for three days. Around this time, the deceased's siblings and clan members exchange shell money. After the burial, the kinfolk stay near the gravesite and mourn for three days. They then continue mourning at temporary huts for almost a month. A special tamaarong performs a ritual during this time which is believed to send the deceased spirit to Gatsam.

== Modern religions ==
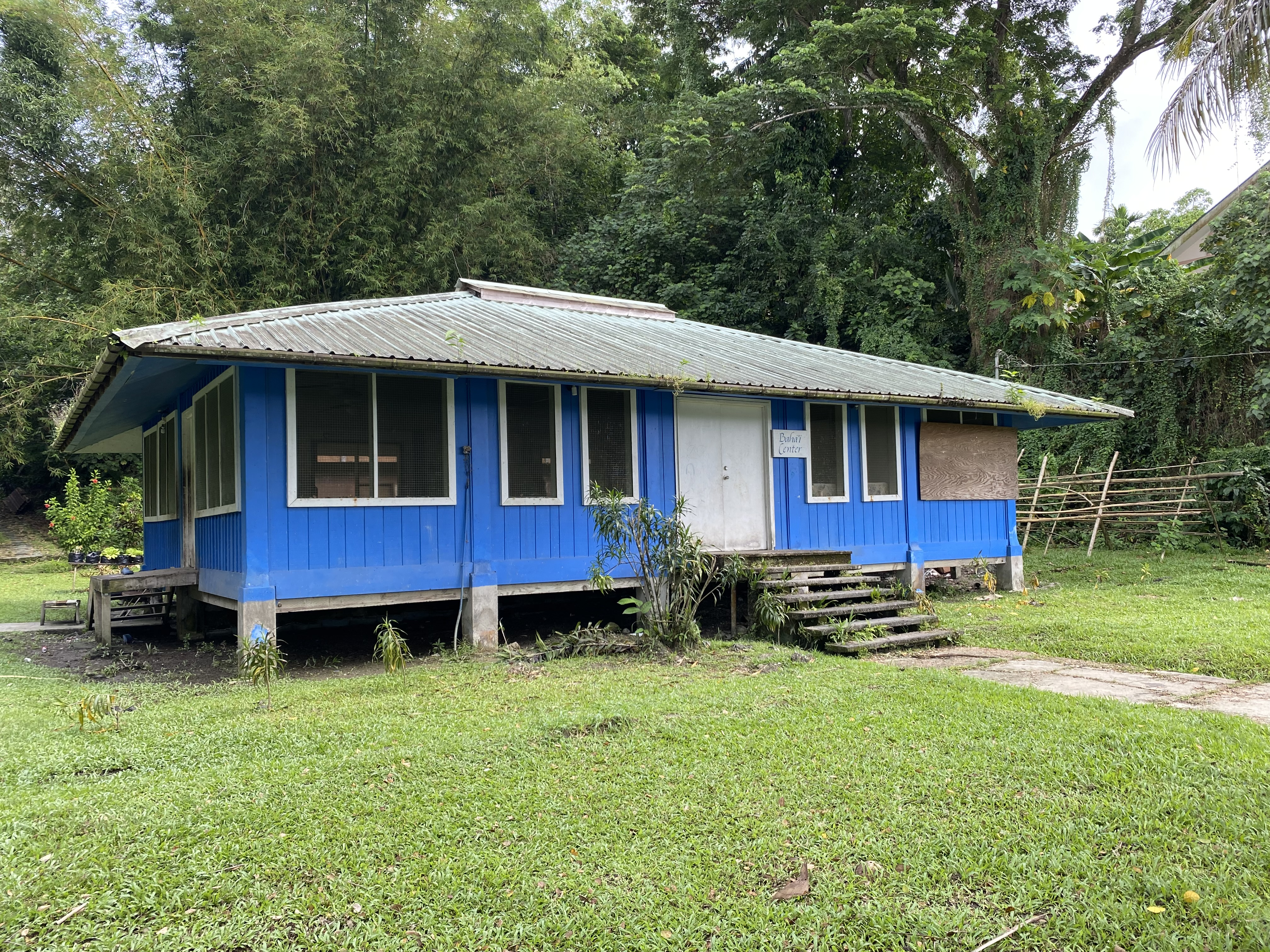
The Bahá'í Center in Yap

Traditional religious practices and ceremonies in Yap have mostly been forgotten, although most of the people still hold animistic beliefs concerning spirits and magic. Catholicism is the unifying force in modern Yapese culture, though Protestant and other Christian sects have small congregations.

=== Statistics ===
Religions on Yap
Religion	1973 Census	1994 Census	2000 Census
Roman Catholic	82.8 %	84.3 %	83.3 %
Protestant	4.1 %	4.1 %	3.4 %
Baptist	—	0.4 %	0.3 %
Seventh-day Adventist	—	0.3 %	0.7 %
Latter-day Saint Church	—	1.0 %	1.1 %
Other religion	2.2 %	3.8 %	5.5 %
Refused/no religion	10.9 %	6.0 %	5.8 %

=== Catholicism ===
Christianity first arrived in Yap when the steamship Manila, carrying six Capuchin missionaries, arrived on June 29, 1886. The missionaries gave gifts to the locals and set up a school to teach the children about writing in Spanish, geography, and arithmetic. In February 1887, around 31 Yapese locals were baptized. However, the Capuchin missionaries struggled to learn the Yapese language and many of the locals held on to their traditional beliefs.

Baptisms and Catholic school attendance dropped in 1890. The Spanish governor imposed a fine to increase school attendance. Six more Capuchin missionaries arrived on Yap in February 1891. In 1892, they started building two churches and smaller chapels on the island. More missionaries arrived in 1893 and 1896 to staff these buildings. By 1899, more than 1,000 Yapese locals were baptized and the island's Catholic schools had a combined enrollment of 542 students. After the Spanish–American War, the German government took control of the island and gave the Catholic Church less support than the Spanish government. School enrollment fell to 9 by the end of Spanish rule on Yap.

A German Capuchin named Salesius Haas arrived in Yap in 1903 and taught German language classes to the locals. More German missionaries arrived in 1904 and 1905. They started evangelization efforts again on Yap, and about 500 Yapese were registered as Catholics in 1906. Three Franciscan nuns arrived on Yap in January 1907 to help in the schools. Two priests arrived on the island in 1909 and 1910. With help from the locals, the missionaries translated religious material into Yapese. The First World War interrupted missionary efforts in October 1914.

The Japanese government took over the island of Yap and had expelled all German missionaries by 1919. However, the Japanese government responded to the people's requests for priests and sent Spanish Jesuits to pick up where past missionaries had let off. In 1925, one of the highest chiefs was baptized, and his family soon followed. Local attitudes toward Christianity shifted, and by 1930 there were about 1,500 Christians on Yap. One Jesuit missionary, Bernardo Espriella, made three proselyting trips to the outer islands of Yap from 1928 to 1932. Espriella then helped rebuild the church in Wanyan. Two chiefs from the villages of Maap and Gachapar were baptized in 1936 and 1937. Luis Blanco became the first missionary to visit Lamotrek in 1938. During World War II, the Japanese government routinely interrogated the mission and had to work around the island's war schedule. The Japanese military police sent the island's priests to Palau in July 1944 and they were executed by the Japanese police on September 18, 1944.

Foreign priests started visiting Yap again in December 1946. During this time, the island was entrusted to the American Jesuits, along with the Caroline-Marshall Islands. In September 1947, Frederick Bailey became the first American priest to reside in Yap. St. Mary's School opened in 1953 and developed in the 1960s. Mission efforts to indigenize the Catholic Church on Yap started during this time, and six Yapese deacons were ordained in 1975. Starting in 1983 and leading up to 2002, five Yapese priests have been ordained.

Censuses conducted in Yap in 1973, 1994, and 2000 showed that the proportion of Catholics on Yap remained over 80%. The outer islands have a higher proportion of Catholics in their population than in Yap proper.

=== Protestantism ===
The first Protestant missionaries on Yap were key advisers on a Bible translation project, Johannes Aigesiil and Gottfried Ngdiramedelemang. In 1952, the Church of Palau sent them to serve on Yap. They encouraged lay Bible study, irritating the Catholic Church.

Edmund Kalau and his wife joined Aigesiil and his wife to travel to Yap in 1959. As part of an effort to fight alcoholism on Yap, Kalau helped construct a youth center. A part of the Kalaus' missionary work in Micronesia involved ferrying sick people to district hospitals on the mainland. They established the Pacific Missionary Aviation (PMA) in 1974 to provide faster transportation to the people of Micronesia. This strained the Kalaus' relation with the Liebenzell Mission and they eventually severed ties.

=== The Church of Jesus Christ of Latter-day Saints ===
In 1977, Charles Keliikipi organized the Church of Jesus Christ of Latter-day Saints (LDS) in Yap. The first missionaries arrived in the 20th century, and the first convert was baptized in March 1978. The first senior missionary couple arrived on Yap on August 2, 1979. The first LDS meetinghouse was completed on January 13, 1981. The Yap Micronesia district was created on March 18, 1981. Yap has two branches, one in Colonia and another in Thol. A 2000 census found that there were 121 Mormons on Yap.

=== Seventh-day Adventist Church ===
The Yap Seventh-day Adventist School opened in 1987 as an elementary school and expanded into a K–12 school. On November 18, 2009, Kirsten Elisabeth Wolcott, a Seventh-day Adventist student missionary on Yap, was stabbed to death while on a morning jog.

=== Bahá'í faith ===
The Bahá'í faith arrived in the Caroline Islands in the 1960s; Yap is home to a Bahá'í center.
