= Yap Day =

Holiday in Yap State, Micronesia

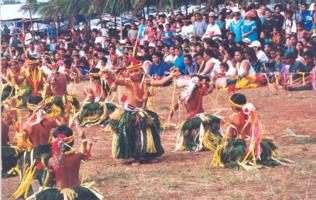
Yapese women dancers celebrating Yap Day

Yap Day is a legal holiday in Yap State, one of the four states of the Federated States of Micronesia (FSM), held annually on March 1. It is a celebration of traditional Yapese culture. Common activities held during this time include competitions and traditional dances.

== History ==
In 1968, the Yap Islands Congress created Yap District Day to preserve Yapese culture. The date March 1 was chosen because it was considered the "most pleasant" season due to its dryness. The event's name was changed to Yap Day in March 1979.

In 1990, Yap Day activities included running, bicycling, juggling, tug of war, coconut husking, and basket weaving. Five dances were also held. Most of these activities and dances were aimed at preserving the culture of Yap properly.

In 1999, Yap Day was held as a three-day celebration starting on February 28. This was reportedly to accommodate the children's school schedule, though observers also noted that this coincided with Yap's tourist flight schedules. The opening ceremony was conducted almost entirely in Yapese. Different dances were held for the boys, girls, women, and men, including standing, sitting, and stick dances. Activities included children's cultural games such as target shooting or basket weaving. Booths around the dance arena represented the outer islands of Yap and international organizations such as the Peace Corps. Other booths sold food.

As of 2001, a member of the Yap Women's Association served each year on the organising committee. In 2002, Yap Day was broadcast throughout the Federated States of Micronesia on radio and throughout Yap proper on television.

== Events ==
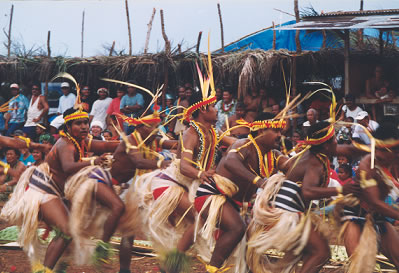
Yapese men dancers celebrating Yap Day

Each year a different village hosts the Mit-mit and provides traditional and Western food. Before Yap Day, the villages rehearse traditional dances, which serve as a mode of storytelling. Outer islanders are prohibited from participating in dances, though they may attend. Competitions include traditional tattooing, fresh produce contests, and traditional games. Other events include displays of traditional Yap shell and stone currency, food tasting, and arts and crafts demonstrations. The Yap Tradition Navigation Society holds an event where participants build and sail traditional canoes. On the last day, the Yap Visitors Bureau hosts a welcome reception to honor guests who traveled to the island.

== See also ==
- Micronesian Games
