= Constitution of the Federated States of Micronesia =

The Constitution of the Federated States of Micronesia is the supreme law of the Federated States of Micronesia. It was adopted in 1979.

== History ==
Constitutional drafting began in June 1975. It was ratified on October 1, 1978, and took effect on May 10, 1979; May 10 is celebrated as Constitution Day. The constitution has been amended once, in 1990.

== Constitution ==
The constitution is based on that of the United States, Micronesia's former trustee. It provides for a separation of powers between the executive, legislative, and judicial branches, as well as a federal system.

However, unlike the United States, Micronesia has a unicameral legislature, called the National Congress, with fourteen senators. Four of them represent the four states for four-year terms, and the other ten representatives apportioned by population and serve two-year terms. Also, the National Congress is responsible for electing the President and Vice President. Most government functions other than foreign policy and national defense are carried out by the State governments. The constitution prohibits non-citizens from owning land in FSM.
