= National Register of Historic Places listings in the Federated States of Micronesia =

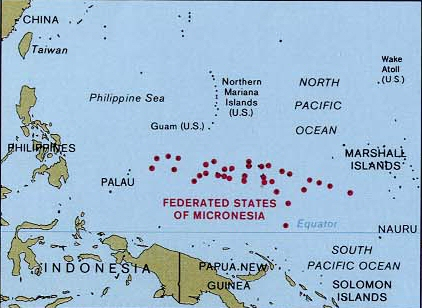
Map of the Federated States of Micronesia

This is a list of the buildings, sites, districts, and objects listed on the National Register of Historic Places in the Federated States of Micronesia. There are currently 27 listed sites located in all 4 states of the Federated States of Micronesia.

This National Park Service list is complete through NPS recent listings posted September 25, 2026.

== Numbers of listings ==
The following are approximate tallies of current listings in the Federated States on the National Register of Historic Places. These counts are based on entries in the National Register Information Database as of April 24, 2008 and new weekly listings posted since then on the National Register of Historic Places web site. There are frequent additions to the listings and occasional delistings and the counts here are not official. Also, the counts in this table exclude boundary increase and decrease listings which modify the area covered by an existing property or district and which carry a separate National Register reference number.

	State	# of Sites
1	Kosrae	4
2	Pohnpei	10
3	Chuuk	8
4	Yap	5
Total:		27

== Kosrae ==
	Name on the Register	Image	Date listed	Location	Municipality	Description
1	Leluh Ruins	Leluh Ruins	August 16, 1986 (#83004524)	Address Restricted	Lelu	
2	Likinlulem	Likinlulem	April 14, 2004 (#04000277)	Walung; 5°17′32″N 162°54′40″E	Walung	
3	Mahkontowe		March 19, 2026 (#100012828)	Central Mountainous area of Kosrae State; 5°18′52″N 162°58′44″E	Lelu, Malem, Tafunsak, and Utwe	
4	Safonfok		February 17, 2002 (#02000004)	Address Restricted	Walung	

== Pohnpei ==
	Name on the Register	Image	Date listed	Location	Municipality	Description
1	Catholic Belltower	Catholic Belltower	November 25, 1980 (#80004399)	Catholic Mission in Kolonia; 6°58′04″N 158°12′42″E	Nett	
2	Chief Agriculturist House		September 30, 1976 (#76002200)	Kolonia; 6°57′31″N 158°12′38″E	Nett	
3	German Cemetery		September 30, 1976 (#76002201)	Kolonia; 6°57′07″N 158°12′58″E	Nett	
4	Japanese Hydro-electric Power Plant		September 30, 1976 (#76002204)	Kolonia; 6°57′33″N 158°12′24″E	Nett	
5	Japanese Shrine		September 30, 1976 (#76002205)	Kolonia; 6°57′50″N 158°12′45″E	Nett	
6	Japanese Elementary School for Ponapean Children		September 30, 1976 (#76002203)	Kolonia; 6°58′01″N 158°12′41″E	Nett	
7	Sokehs Mass Grave Site		September 30, 1976 (#76002206)	Kolonia; 6°58′10″N 158°12′17″E	Nett	
8	Spanish Wall	Spanish Wall	December 19, 1974 (#74002227)	Litkin Kel; 6°58′05″N 158°13′08″E	Nett	
9	Japanese Artillery Road and Pohndolap Area		September 30, 1976 (#76002202)	Sokehs; 6°58′03″N 158°11′00″E	Sokehs	
10	Nan Madol	Nan Madol	December 19, 1974 (#74002226)	East side of Temwen Island; 6°50′40″N 158°20′09″E	Madolenihmw	

== Chuuk ==
	Name on the Register	Image	Date listed	Location	Municipality	Description
1	Japanese Army Headquarters		September 30, 1976 (#76002208)	Roro; 7°22′46″N 151°52′39″E	Tonowas	World War II underground headquarters bunker
2	Xavier High School - Micronesia		September 30, 1976 (#76002209)	Winipis; 7°26′51″N 151°53′15″E	Moen	
3	Tonnachau Mountain	Tonnachau Mountain	September 30, 1976 (#76002210)	Iras; 7°27′20″N 151°50′47″E	Moen	
4	Tonotan Guns and Caves		September 30, 1976 (#76002211)	Nantuku; 7°26′30″N 151°50′53″E	Moen	
5	Wiichen Men's Meetinghouse		September 30, 1976 (#76002213)	Peniesene; 7°27′07″N 151°52′06″E	Moen	
6	Japanese Lighthouse		August 16, 1983 (#83004523)	Alet Island; 7°22′15″N 149°10′11″E	Poluwat	
7	Fauba Archaeological Site	Fauba Archaeological Site	March 21, 1978 (#78003152)	Address Restricted	Faichuk	
8	Truk Lagoon Underwater Fleet, Truk Atoll	Truk Lagoon Underwater Fleet, Truk Atoll	September 30, 1979 (#76002267)	Truk Lagoon; 7°21′19″N 151°52′00″E	Tonowas; Fefan; Uman	

== Yap ==
	Name on the Register	Image	Date listed	Location	Municipality	Description
1	Rull Men's Meetinghouse	Rull Men's Meetinghouse	September 30, 1976 (#76002214)	Rull; 9°30′19″N 138°07′21″E	Rull	
2	O'Keefe's Island		September 30, 1976 (#76002216)	Near Colonia; 9°31′38″N 138°07′54″E	Weloy	
3	Spanish Fort		September 30, 1976 (#76002215)	Colonia; 9°30′50″N 138°07′36″E	Weloy	
4	Dinay Village		April 14, 2004 (#04000276)	Dinay; 9°30′37″N 138°06′12″E	Rull	
5	Bechiel Village Historic District	Bechiel Village Historic District	June 19, 1983 (#83004522)	Address Restricted	Maap	

== See also ==
- List of United States National Historic Landmarks in United States commonwealths and territories, associated states, and foreign states
