= List of cities and towns in the Federated States of Micronesia =

This is a list of cities and towns in the Federated States of Micronesia. They are sorted here by state, and alphabetically

== Chuuk (Truk) Islands ==
Cities and towns in Chuuk, also known as Truk, are as follows:

- Fefan
- Lekinioch
- Lugav
- Nepononong
- Niewe
- Nukaf
- Nukan
- Ounoun Municipality
- Polle Island
- Roro
- Ruo
- Sapou
- Tol Island
- Udot
- Weno

== Kosrae ==
Cities and Towns in Kosrae, also known as Kosaie, are as follows:

- Lelu
- Malem
- Okat
- Tafunsak
- Tofol
- Utwa Ma
- Walung
- Yeseng

== Pohnpei ==
Cities and towns in Pohnpei, also known as Ponape, are as follows:

- Alohkapw
- Danipei
- Dauahk Islands
- Dehpehk Island
- Enipein
- Kipar
- Lot
- Madolenihmw
- Meilap
- Mokil
- Mwahd
- Mwalok
- Palikir
- Parem Island
- Peidi
- Peidi Island
- Pingelap
- Pwel Weita
- Rehntu
- Rohi
- Takaieu Island
- Tamworohi
- Wone

== Yap ==
Cities and towns in Yap are as follows:

- Baleabat'
- Bechyal
- Bugol
- Colonia
- Dinaey
- Gagil-Tomil
- Gaqnaqun
- Kanif
- Maap
- Maaq
- Magachgil
- Mal'Aay
- Ngariy
- Ngoof
- Rumung
- Ruun'Uw
- Wanead
- Wanyaan
