= Utwe =

Municipality in Kosrae, Federal States of Micronesia

- Flag Seal

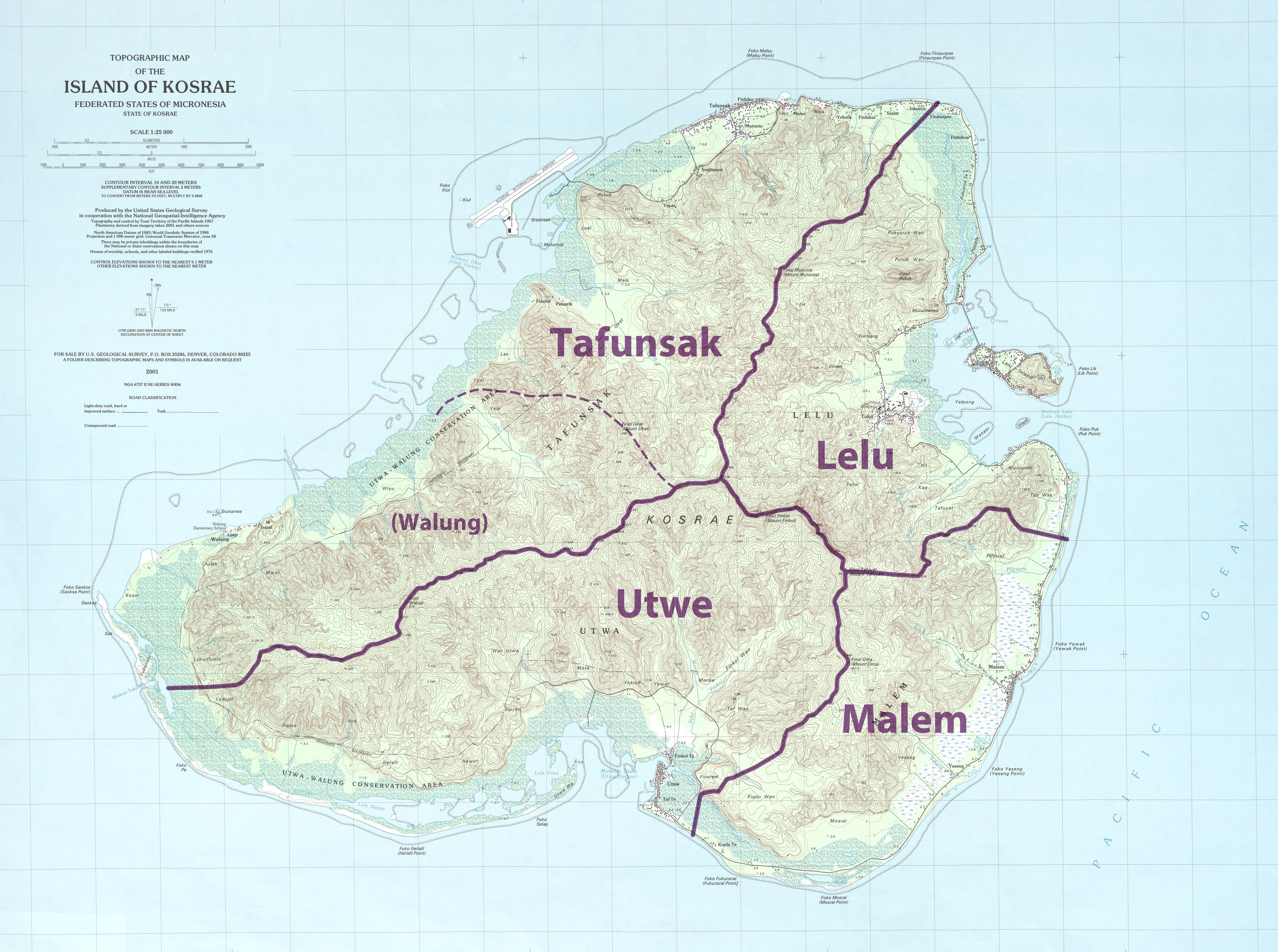
- Utwe is in the southwest
- Coordinates: 5.295°N 162.966°E
- Country: Federated States of Micronesia
- State: Kosrae

Utwe (or Utwa) is the second-largest municipality in the Micronesian state of Kosrae, the largest being Tafunsak.

== Geography ==
Utwe occupies the very South of the island, but has no coast on its East border. In 1994 the total population of Utwe was 1,056. Utwe's capital is Utwa Ma (Utwe Village).

== Utwe-Walung Marine Park ==
Utwe is home to the Utwe-Walung Marine Park, a conservation area established by Madison Nena, a local ecologist who has won several awards, including the 1999 Seacology Prize, awarded annually to an indigenous islander for outstanding achievement in preserving the environment and culture of any of the world's more than 100,000 islands. In the late 1990s, Madison Nena successfully led a campaign to prevent property developers from building a tourist complex without adequate sewage facilities, and in its place he founded an eco-tourism initiative at Kosrae Village Resort. He has also worked with island elders to revitalize historic methods of Kosraean house construction.

The park features excellent examples of healthy hard coral, as well as some of Micronesia's most pristine forests and extensive mangrove ecosystems. The park's main office is close to the shipwreck site of the infamous pirate trader Bully Hayes, and it is rumored that Hayes buried some treasure somewhere in the forest.

== Education ==
Kosrae State Department of Education operates Utwe Elementary School. High school students attend Kosrae High School in Tofol, Lelu municipality.

== Climate ==
Utwe has a tropical rainforest climate (Af) with very heavy rainfall year-round.

Climate data for Utwe
Month	Jan	Feb	Mar	Apr	May	Jun	Jul	Aug	Sep	Oct	Nov	Dec	Year
Mean daily maximum °C (°F)	30.2 (86.4)	30.1 (86.2)	30.1 (86.2)	30.1 (86.2)	30.1 (86.2)	30.2 (86.4)	30.3 (86.5)	30.7 (87.3)	30.6 (87.1)	30.8 (87.4)	30.6 (87.1)	30.2 (86.4)	30.3 (86.6)
Daily mean °C (°F)	27.5 (81.5)	27.4 (81.3)	27.4 (81.3)	27.3 (81.1)	27.3 (81.1)	27.3 (81.1)	27.2 (81.0)	27.5 (81.5)	27.3 (81.1)	27.6 (81.7)	27.4 (81.3)	27.4 (81.3)	27.4 (81.3)
Mean daily minimum °C (°F)	24.8 (76.6)	24.7 (76.5)	24.7 (76.5)	24.5 (76.1)	24.5 (76.1)	24.4 (75.9)	24.1 (75.4)	24.3 (75.7)	24.1 (75.4)	24.4 (75.9)	24.3 (75.7)	24.6 (76.3)	24.5 (76.0)
Average rainfall mm (inches)	402 (15.8)	489 (19.3)	504 (19.8)	586 (23.1)	493 (19.4)	454 (17.9)	447 (17.6)	416 (16.4)	383 (15.1)	344 (13.5)	414 (16.3)	512 (20.2)	5,444 (214.4)
Source: Climate-Data.org

== Notable Person ==
- Adelyn Noda - teacher and deaconess

== See also ==
- Lelu
- Malem
- Tafunsak
- Walung
- Kosrae
