= Malem =

Malem may refer to:

- Malem, Ghent, a neighbourhood of Ghent, Belgium
- Malem, Federated States of Micronesia, a municipality in the state of Kosrae
