= List of rivers of the Federated States of Micronesia =

This is a list of the rivers of the Federated States of Micronesia, arranged by State:

== Chuuk ==
- Wichen

== Kosrae ==
- Infal Mutunte
- Infal Yekula
- Infal Sialat
- Infal Innem
- Infal Sunganspaul
- Infal Tofol
- Infal Kaa
- Infal Tafuyat
- Infal Pilyuul
- Infal Malem
- Infal Yeseng
- Infal Finkol
  - Infal Palusrik
  - Infal Menka
- Infal Utwa
- Infal Isra
- Infal Falwe
- Infal Yemulil
- Infal Lukunlulem
- Infal Panyea
- Infal Mwot
- Infal Lenwot
- Infal Saksro
- Infal Wiyu
- Infal Yela
- Infal Las
- Infal Okat
  - Infal Melo

== Pohnpei ==
- Pilan Dauen Neu
- Pilan Lewi
- Pilan Kiepw
- Pilan Meitik
- Pilan Sepeipei
- Pilan Luhke
- Pilan Kepin Awak
- Pilan Pweikamw
- Pilan Tuweri
- Pilan Ohwa
- Pilan Semwei
- Pilan Pahnahdo
- Pilan Pwadapwad
- Pilan Kitamw
- Pilan Lehdau
- Pilan nan Kerepene
  - Pilan nan Riohk
  - Pilan en Senipehn
- Pilan Nankep
- Pilan en Mahud
  - Pilan Mese
- Pilan Kihlid
- Pilan en Lohd
- Pilan Neh
- Pilan Nanwou
- Pilan Semwei
- Pilan Kidar
- Oalos River
  - Pilen Sapwtakai
  - Pilen Pahnihwi
  - Pilen Pohnahtik
- Pilen Mwahi
- Lehn Diepei
  - Pilen Pwadapwad
  - Lehn Mesi
    - Pillapen Kiti
- Pilen Koamoahd
- Pilen Nan Lapahu
- Pillapen Pehleng
- Pilen Sakartik
- Pilapen Seniahdak
- Pillapen Soundau
  - Kiriedleng
- Pillapen Kepin Lahpar
- Pilen Kerir
- Pillapen Nankewi
