= Likinlulem =

- U.S. National Register of Historic Places
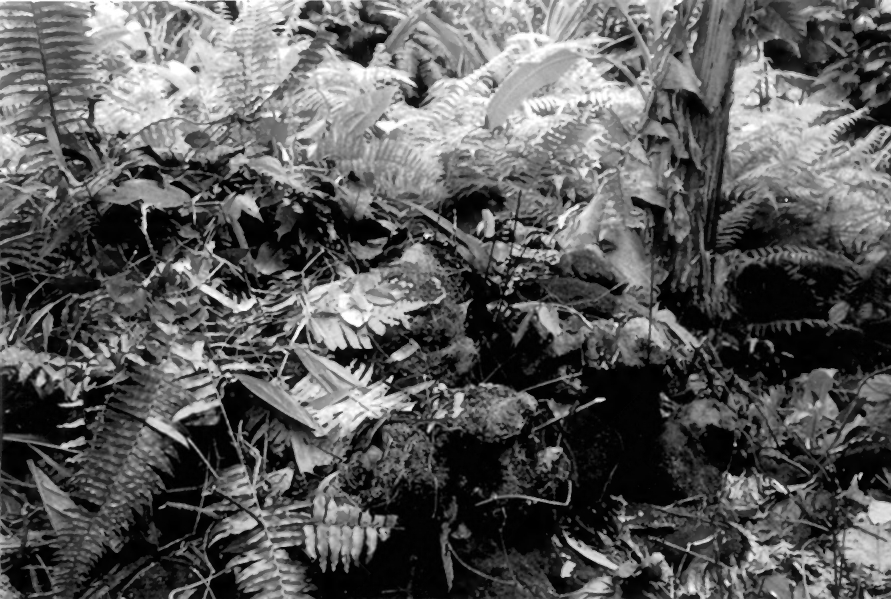
- Entrance at canoe landing in 2003.

- Location within Federated States of Micronesia
- Location: Walung, Kosrae, Federated States of Micronesia
- Coordinates: 5°17′31″N 162°54′32″E
- Area: 7.4 acres (3.0 ha)
- NRHP reference No.: 04000277
- Added to NRHP: April 14, 2004

Likinlulem is a major archaeological site on the island of Kosrae in the Federated States of Micronesia. The site encompasses more than 7 acres (2.8 ha) on either side of Likinlulem Stream on the island's southwestern coast, in an area that is now overgrown mangrove swamp. It includes at least nine large enclosures with extensive internal features, a channelized stream, canoe landing, and a large open platform that is subject to inundation at high tide. Occupancy of the site has been dated to 1200-1800 CE, with one area possibly dating as far back as 1000 CE. The site is an important element of the island's oral history as it was here that its paramount chiefs are said to have held court prior to the ascendancy of Leluh c. 1400. When the site was listed on the United States National Register of Historic Places in 2004, it had been surveyed but not extensively excavated.
