= Finkol River =

River in Kosrae, Micronesia

Coordinates: 5.2759°N 162.9792°E

The Finkol River is a river on the Micronesian island of Kosrae. It flows south from the slopes of Mount Finkol, reaching the Pacific Ocean close to Utwa Ma.
