= Safonfok =

Archaeological site in Federated States of Micronesia

- U.S. National Register of Historic Places
- Nearest city: Walung, Federated States of Micronesia
- Area: 3.5 acres (1.4 ha)
- NRHP reference No.: 02000004
- Added to NRHP: February 17, 2002

Safonfok is a prehistoric archaeological site near Walung, on the island of Kosrae in the Federated States of Micronesia. At the time of its discovery in 1999, it was one of the largest prehistoric industrial complex found in the islands of the Pacific. The site, whose extent has not been fully determined, was excavated in 1999-2000, revealing a major complex where an estimated hundreds of workers manufactured coral fish hooks and other tools.

The site was listed on the United States National Register of Historic Places in 2002.
