= Lelu Island =

Island in Kosrae, Federated States of Micronesia

Lelu
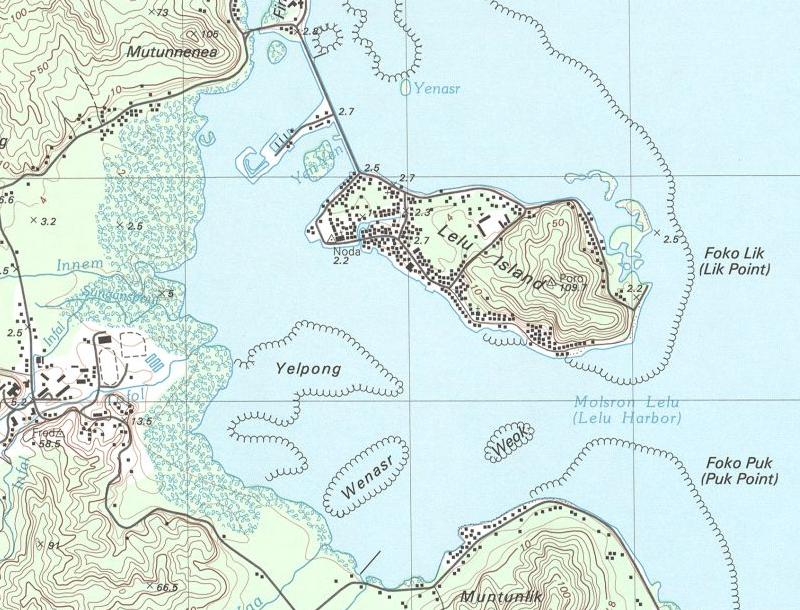
- Topographic map of Lelu Island
- Interactive map of Lelu

Geography
- Location: North Pacific
- Coordinates: 5°20′N 163°02′E
- Archipelago: Caroline
- Total islands: 1
- Area: 1 km^{2} (0.39 sq mi)
- Highest elevation: 109.7 m (359.9 ft)

Administration
- Federated States of Micronesia

Demographics
- Population: 1,594 (1980)
- Ethnic groups: Micronesian (Kosraean)

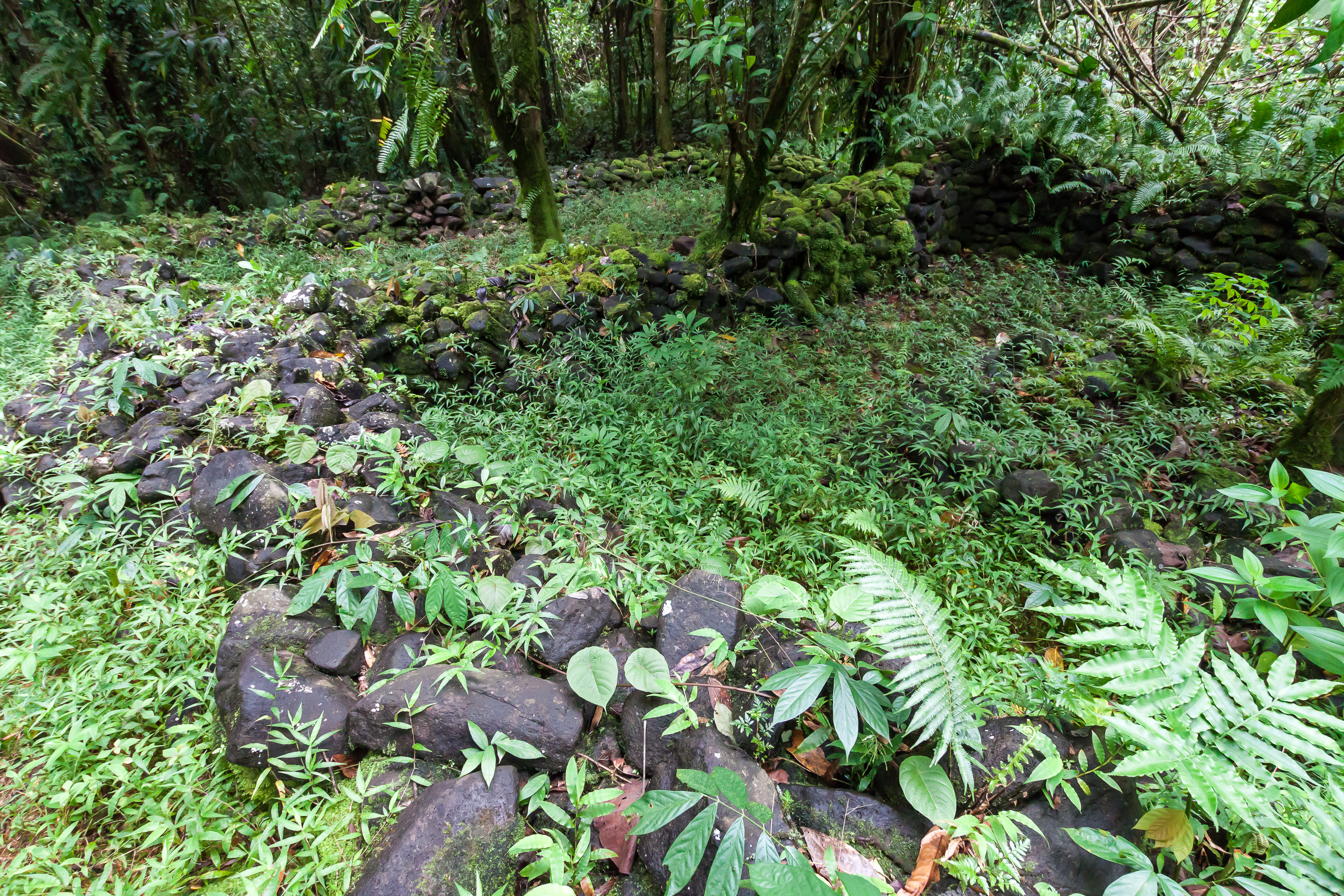
Lelu Ruins

Lelu Island is a small island in Lelu Harbour, in the Lelu municipality of Kosrae. It is home to the Leluh archaeological site.

== Education ==
Kosrae State Department of Education operates Lelu Elementary School on Lelu Island. High school students attend Kosrae High School in Tofol.
