= Japanese Artillery Road and Pohndolap Area =

- U.S. National Register of Historic Places
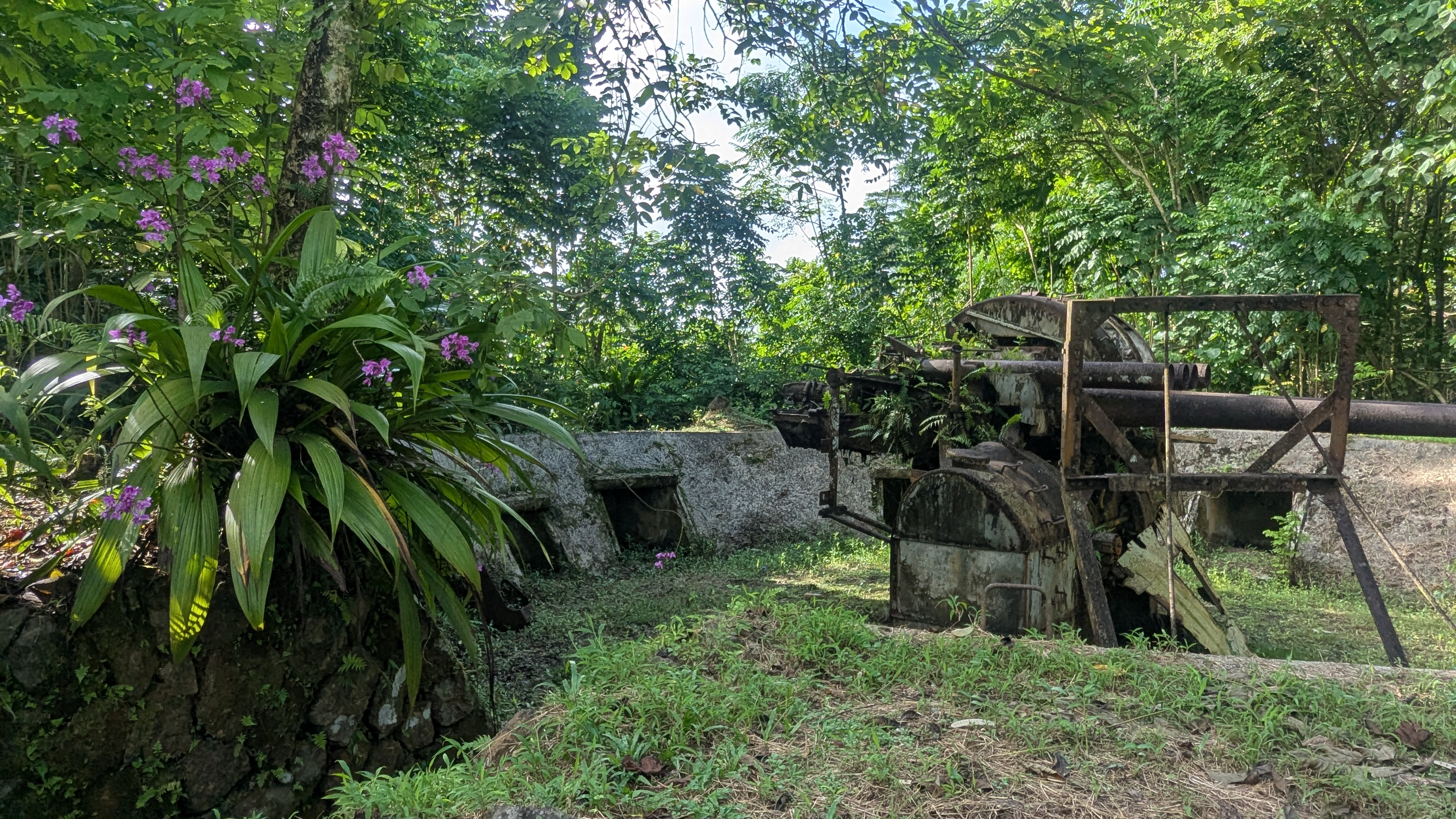

- Location within Federated States of Micronesia
- Location: Sokehs, Pohnpei State, Federated States of Micronesia
- Coordinates: 6°57′52″N 158°11′28″E
- Area: 122.6 acres (49.6 ha)
- Built: 1911
- NRHP reference No.: 76002202
- Added to NRHP: September 30, 1976

The Japanese Artillery Road and Pohndolap Area are a historic area on Sokehs Island (now actually a peninsula of Pohnpei) in the Federated States of Micronesia. Sokehs has a prominent north-south ridge (known locally as "Pohndolap", overlooking the state capital Kolonia, and was fortified by the Japanese during World War II. They built a road to the summit area and emplaced anti-aircraft guns on the ridge. The ridge was also a key site in the 1910 Sokehs Rebellion against German rule, and the remnants of a Pohnpeian fort are also in the area. The surviving elements of these fortifications were listed on the United States National Register of Historic Places in 1976. The old road is now part of a hiking trail, leading up to the fortifications.
