= Sokehs Mass Grave Site =

- U.S. National Register of Historic Places
- Location within Federated States of Micronesia
- Location: Kolonia, Pohnpei State, Federated States of Micronesia
- Coordinates: 6°58′00.2″N 158°12′41.6″E
- Area: 0.1 acres (0.040 ha)
- Built: 1911
- NRHP reference No.: 76002206
- Added to NRHP: September 30, 1976

The Sokehs Mass Grave Site is the location where fifteen participants of the 1910/1911 Sokehs Rebellion on the island of Pohnpei were buried by German colonial authorities. The rebellion broke out in October 1910 on Sokehs Island and was suppressed by German naval forces by early 1911. At a summary trial of 36 Sokehs rebels, 17 were convicted of murder and insurrection, and 15 subsequently executed by firing squad and buried in this mass grave. All members of the Sokehs tribe were then exiled to Babelthuap. The mass grave site is a roughly square area 16 feet (4.9 m) on each side, surrounded by a low stone wall. The site is now identified by a memorial marker.

The site was listed on the United States National Register of Historic Places in 1976, when Pohnpei was part of the US-administered Trust Territory of the Pacific Islands.
