= Adelyn Noda =

Micronesian teacher and deaconness

Adelyn Noda (née Benjamin; born 5 October 1950) is a former teacher from Kosrae in the Federated States of Micronesia. In 1983, she became the youngest woman from Kosrae to be ordained as a deaconess.

== Biography ==
She was born on 5 October 1950 in Malem, but grew up in Utwe. Her father was Reverend Benjamin Benjamin. She attended Utwe Elementary School and Bethania High School in Belau from 1965 to 1969. She graduated in 1972 from Micronesia Community College. She married mechanic Henry Noda and returned to Utwe Elementary School to teach. In 1974, she moved to teach English at Kosrae High School and from 1978 to 1985 was head of the department.

In 1983, she was ordained as a deaconess, becoming the youngest woman to be ordained to the position in the history of Kosrae.

As of 2006, she was a Kosraean culture tutor at the College of Micronesia.

== Awards ==
- Kosrae Teacher of the Year (1982)
