= Utwa Ma =

Capital of Utwa, Kosrae, Micronesia

Coordinates: 5.2749°N 162.9764°E

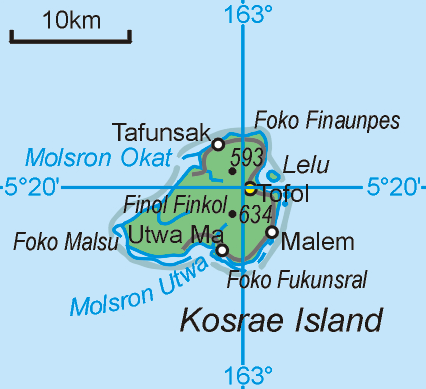
Map of Kosrae, showing Utwa Ma's location.

Utwa Ma is the capital of Utwa, a municipality in the Micronesian state of Kosrae.

'Utwa Ma' is Kosraean for Utwa Village. The village itself is the largest village in Utwa, and lies close to the mouth of the Finkol River.

== Climate ==
Climate data for Utwa Ma
| Month | Jan | Feb | Mar | Apr | May | Jun | Jul | Aug | Sep | Oct | Nov | Dec | Year |
|---|---|---|---|---|---|---|---|---|---|---|---|---|---|
| Mean daily maximum °C (°F) | 30.1 (86.1) | 30.3 (86.6) | 30.2 (86.3) | 30.5 (86.9) | 30.4 (86.7) | 31 (87) | 31 (87) | 30.6 (87.1) | 30.8 (87.4) | 30.6 (87.1) | 30.2 (86.4) | 30.4 (86.7) | 30.4 (86.8) |
| Mean daily minimum °C (°F) | 23.9 (75.1) | 24.3 (75.7) | 24.1 (75.4) | 24.2 (75.6) | 24.1 (75.3) | 23.7 (74.7) | 24 (75) | 24.0 (75.2) | 24.1 (75.3) | 24.1 (75.4) | 24 (75) | 24.1 (75.3) | 24.1 (75.3) |
| Average precipitation mm (inches) | 440 (17.3) | 330 (12.8) | 400 (15.9) | 520 (20.3) | 430 (17) | 420 (16.4) | 380 (14.9) | 370 (14.4) | 380 (15.1) | 330 (12.8) | 370 (14.7) | 440 (17.4) | 4,800 (189) |
Source: Weatherbase
