= Tafunsak =

Largest settlement in Kosrae, Federal States of Micronesia

Coordinates: 5.3675°N 162.9871°E

- Municipality
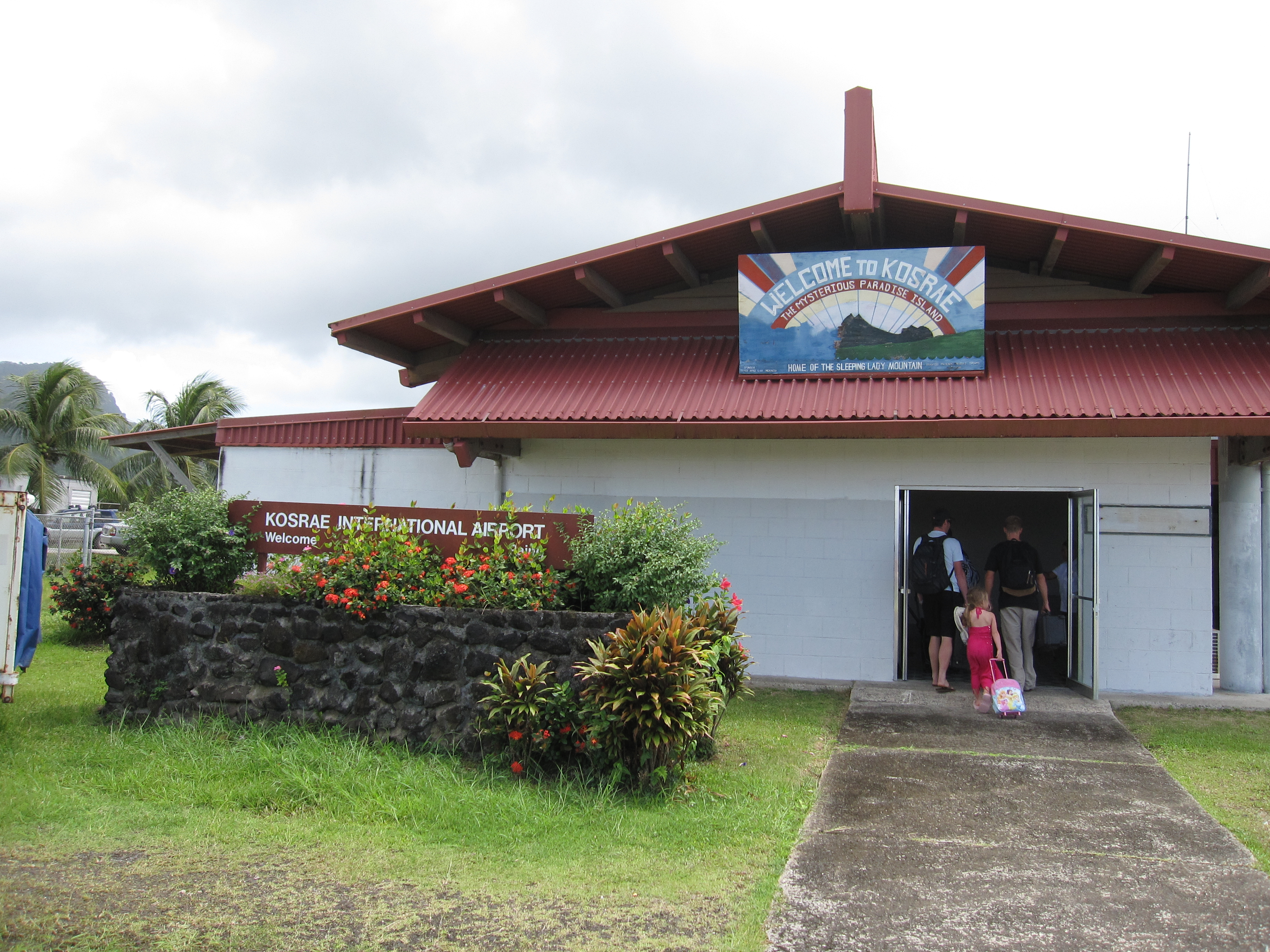
- Kosrae International Airport

- Flag Seal
- Interactive map of Tafunsak
- Country: Federated States of Micronesia
- State: Kosrae

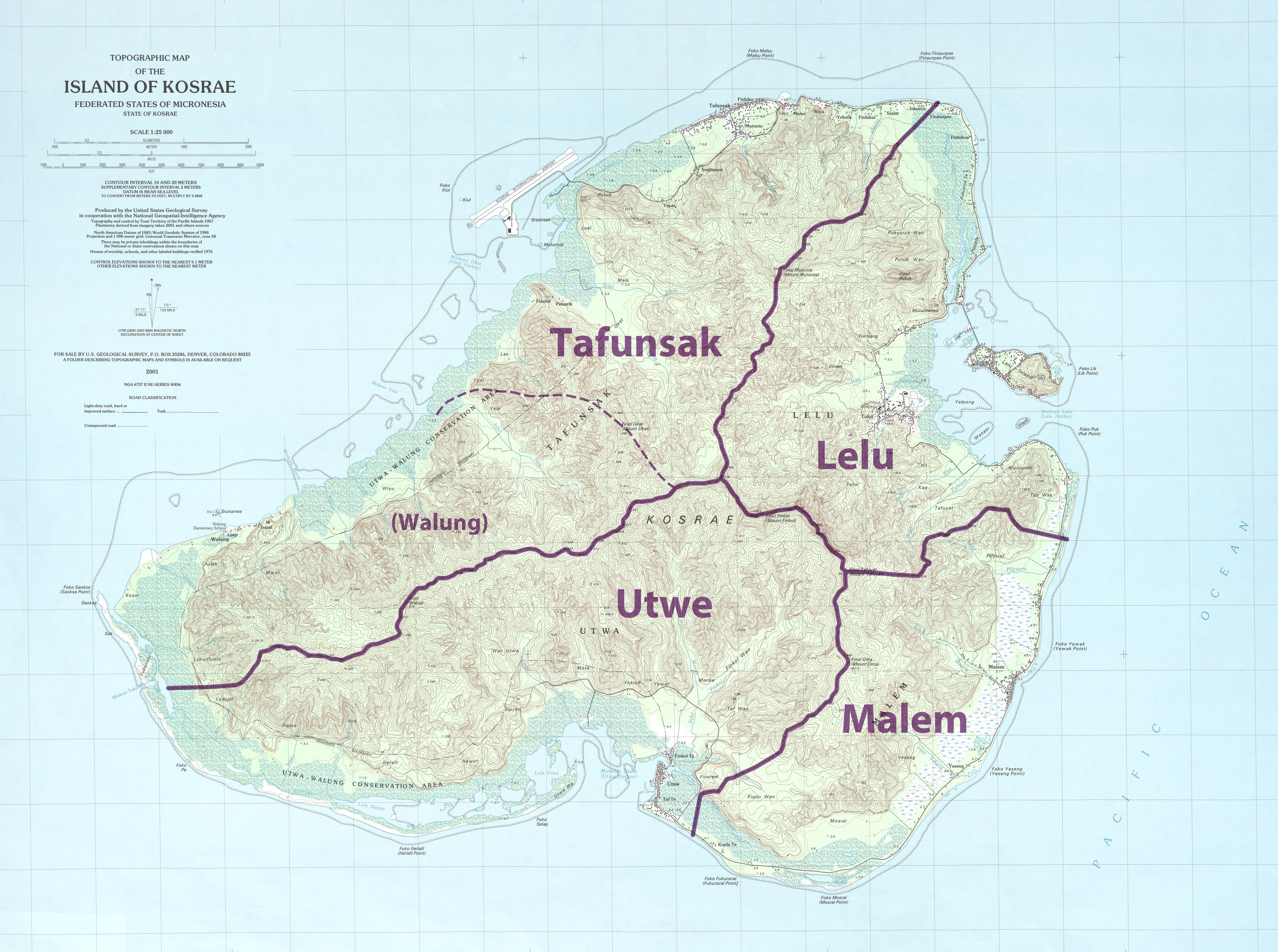
Tafunsak is in the north

Tafunsak (formerly transliterated as Tahfuhnsahk) is the largest settlement on the island of Kosrae in the Federated States of Micronesia. Its population was 2,457 at the 2000 census. This includes Walung, which had been incorporated into the municipality of Tafunsak since the 1980s. The area of the municipality is 42.8 km^{2}, making it the largest municipality by area. This includes the 19.5 km^{2} of former Walung municipality.

The word "Tafunsak" means "half forest and half beach," the former referring to the island's tropical jungles.

Tafunsak is the closest village by road to Kosrae Airport.

== Education ==
Kosrae State Department of Education operates Tafunsak Elementary School and Walung Elementary School. High school students attend Kosrae High School in Tofol, Lelu municipality.

== Climate ==
Tafunsak has a tropical rainforest climate (Af) with very heavy rainfall year-round.

Climate data for Tafunsak
Month	Jan	Feb	Mar	Apr	May	Jun	Jul	Aug	Sep	Oct	Nov	Dec	Year
Mean daily maximum °C (°F)	30.2 (86.4)	30.1 (86.2)	30.1 (86.2)	30.0 (86.0)	30.2 (86.4)	30.2 (86.4)	30.2 (86.4)	30.7 (87.3)	30.7 (87.3)	30.8 (87.4)	30.6 (87.1)	30.2 (86.4)	30.3 (86.6)
Daily mean °C (°F)	27.5 (81.5)	27.4 (81.3)	27.4 (81.3)	27.2 (81.0)	27.4 (81.3)	27.3 (81.1)	27.1 (80.8)	27.5 (81.5)	27.4 (81.3)	27.5 (81.5)	27.4 (81.3)	27.4 (81.3)	27.4 (81.3)
Mean daily minimum °C (°F)	24.8 (76.6)	24.7 (76.5)	24.7 (76.5)	24.5 (76.1)	24.6 (76.3)	24.4 (75.9)	24.1 (75.4)	24.3 (75.7)	24.2 (75.6)	24.3 (75.7)	24.3 (75.7)	24.6 (76.3)	24.5 (76.0)
Average rainfall mm (inches)	396 (15.6)	479 (18.9)	496 (19.5)	577 (22.7)	490 (19.3)	451 (17.8)	445 (17.5)	414 (16.3)	383 (15.1)	344 (13.5)	412 (16.2)	506 (19.9)	5,393 (212.3)
Source: Climate-Data.org
