= Bechiyal =

Village in Yap State, Federated States of Micronesia

Coordinates: 9°36′55″N 138°10′15″E

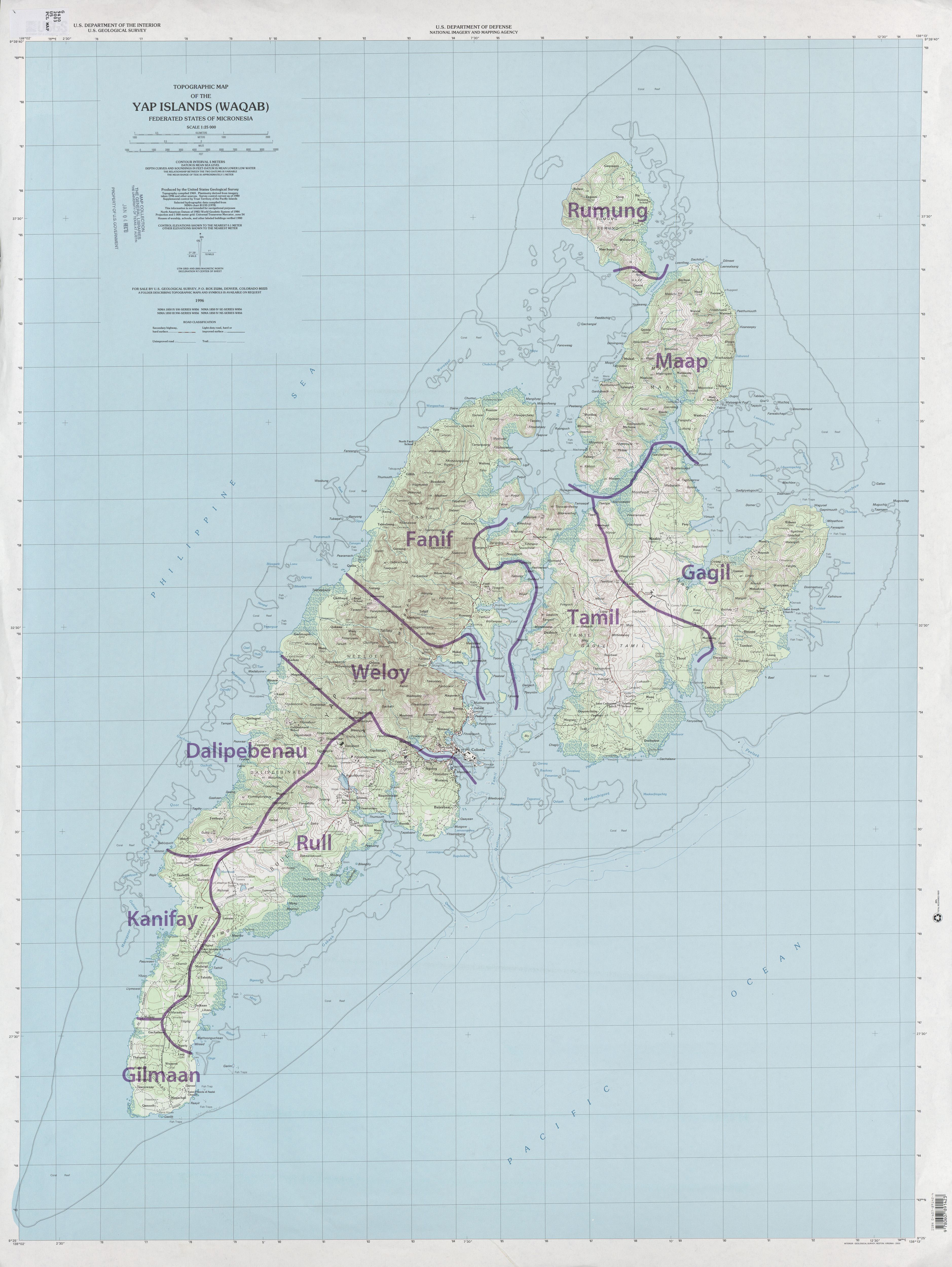
Map of the municipalities of Yap including Maap

Bechiyal, also variously Bechiel or Bechyal, is a village in the municipality of Maap in the state of Yap, Federated States of Micronesia. When visited in the 1984 it had a population of about ten. The village was once larger, with a documented population of about 200 in the early 20th century. There are a significant number of stone platforms, sites where houses would have stood, and the village site is considered archaeologically sensitive. It was listed on the United States National Register of Historic Places in 1983.
