= Mount Finkol =

Mountain in Kosrae, Micronesia

Coordinates: 5.3112°N 162.9906°E

Mount Finkol includes the highest point on the island of Kosrae in the Federated States of Micronesia. It rises to a height of 2064 ft (619 m).
