= Walung, Federated States of Micronesia =

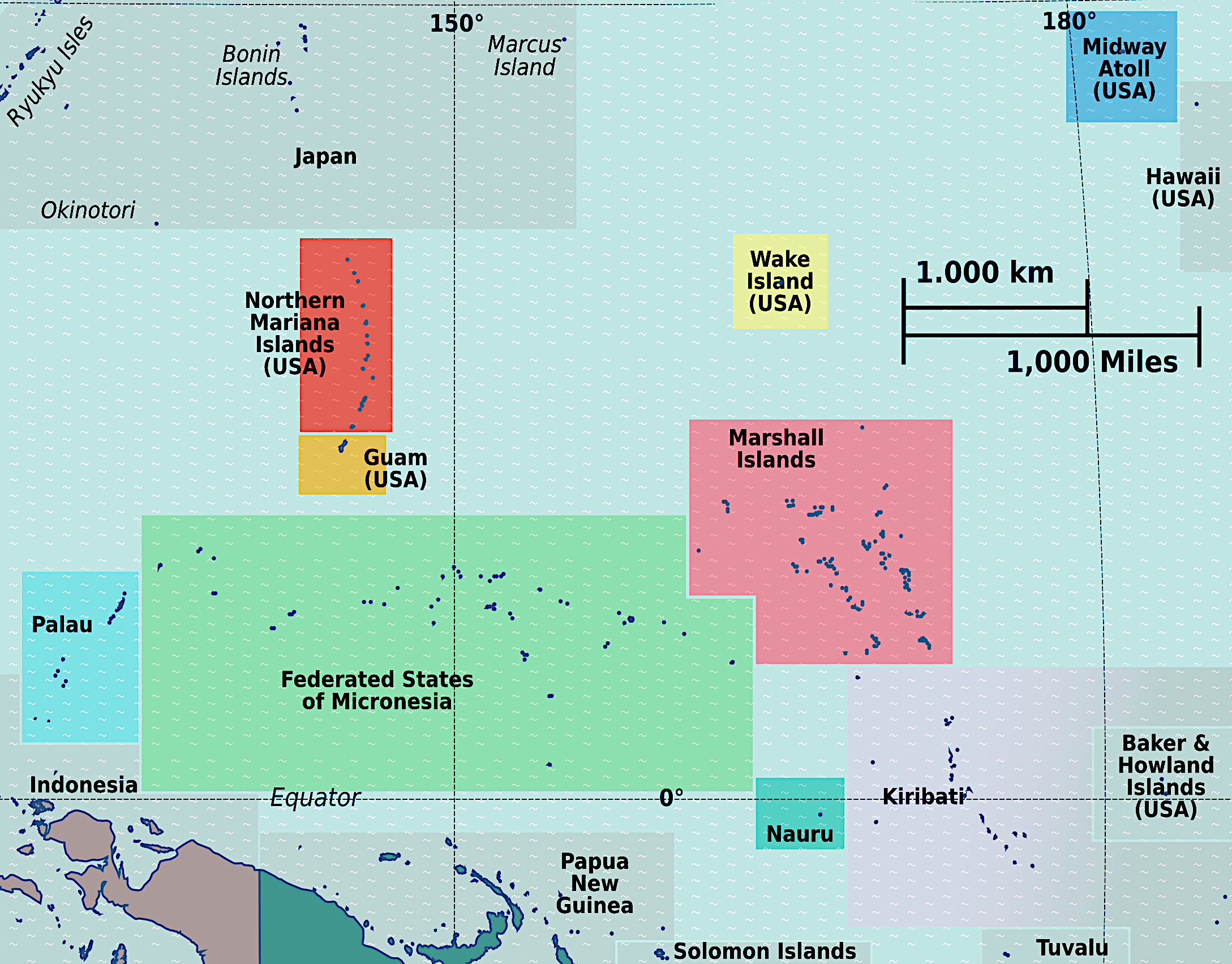
- Location within Federated States of Micronesia Location within Micronesia
- Coordinates: 5.306°N 162.925°E

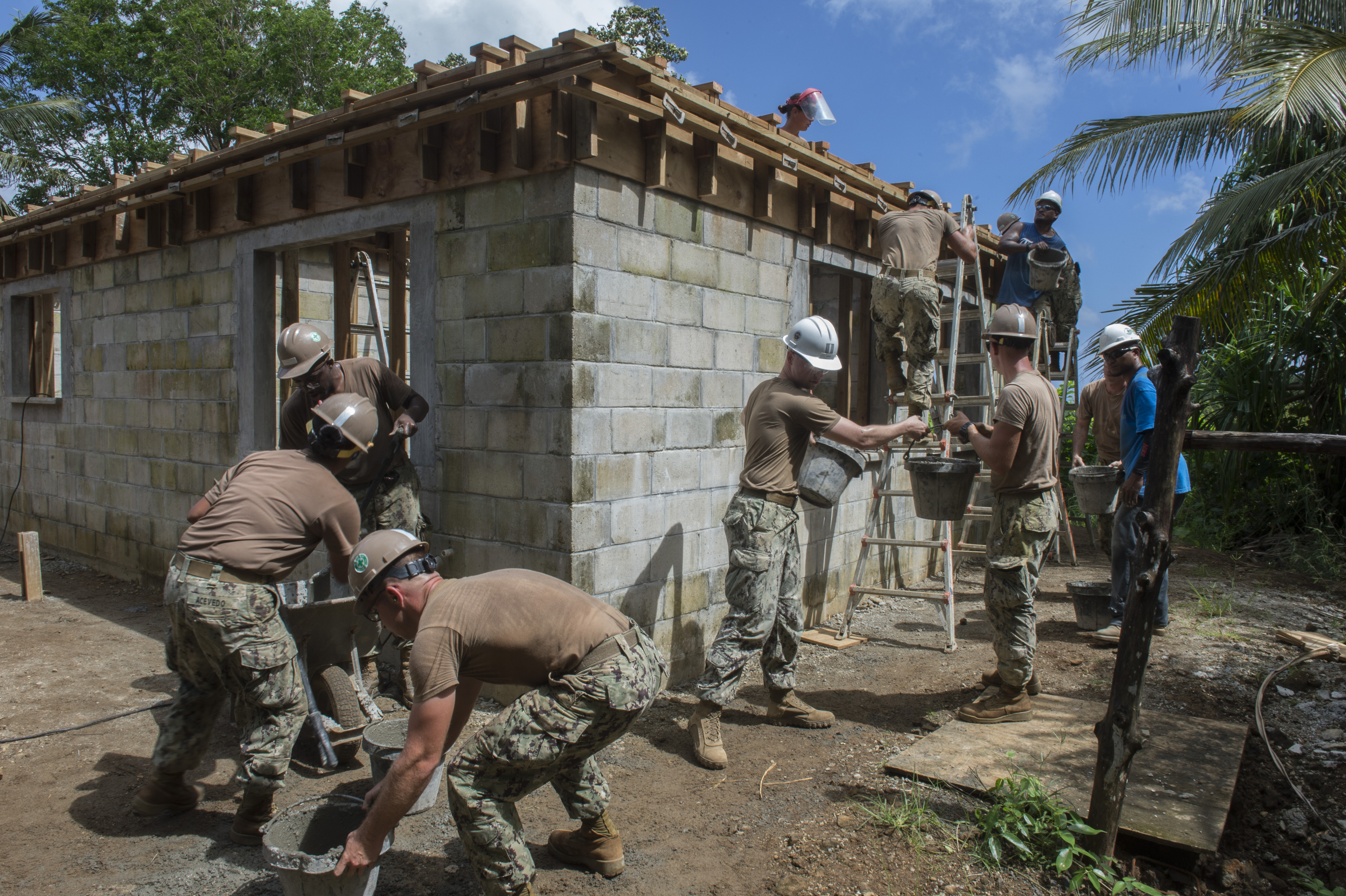
Sailors assigned to U.S. Naval Mobile Construction Battalion work with Kosraean workers to construct the Walung Health Clinic

Walung was the smallest of the original five municipalities of the state of Kosrae, Federated States of Micronesia. Since the 1980s, it has been part of the municipality of Tafunsak.

== Geography ==
Walung is located at the Southwest point of the island, northwest of Utwa and southwest of Tafunsak village. Most of its western edge is coastline. Walung does not reach far towards the center of Kosrae. The capital of Walung was Walung Village.

With a population of only 151 at the census of 1980 (out of 5,491 for the state of Kosrae), Walung was by far the smallest of the five municipalities. Utwe, the second smallest, had a population of 912. The area of the municipality was about 19.5 km^{2}.

== Utwa-Walung Marine Park ==
Walung and Utwa are home to the Utwa-Walung Marine Park, a conservation area established by Madison Nena, a local ecologist who has won several awards, including the Seacology Prize in 1999. In the late 1990s, Madison Nena successfully led a campaign to prevent property developers from building a tourist complex without adequate sewage facilities, and in its place he founded an eco-tourism initiative at Kosrae Village Resort. He has also worked with island elders to revitalize historic methods of Kosraean house construction.

The park features excellent examples of healthy hard coral, as well as some of Micronesia's most pristine forests and extensive mangrove ecosystems. The park's main office is close to the shipwreck site of the infamous pirate trader Bully Hayes, and it is rumored that Hayes buried some treasure somewhere in the forest.

== Education ==
Kosrae State Department of Education operates Walung Elementary School. High school students attend Kosrae High School in Tofol, Lelu municipality.

== See also ==
- Kosrae
- Lelu
- Malem
- Tafunsak
- Utwe

== Maps ==
- General Soil Map of Kosrae produced by the US Department of Agriculture
