= Kosrae State Department of Education =

Kosrae State Department of Education (KDOE) is an agency of Kosrae State, Federated States of Micronesia that operates public schools. It is headquartered in Tofol.

== Schools ==
Kosrae High School (Tofol, Lelu) is the sole high school.

Elementary schools:

- Lelu Elementary School - Lelu Island, Lelu Municipality
- Malem Elementary School
- Sansrihk Elementary School - Lelu Municipality
- Tafunsak Elementary School
- Utwe Elementary School
- Walung Elementary School - Tafunsak Municipality

== See also ==
- Education in the Federated States of Micronesia
