= Japanese Elementary School for Ponapean Children =

- U.S. National Register of Historic Places
- Location within Federated States of Micronesia
- Location: Kolonia, Pohnpei State, Federated States of Micronesia
- Coordinates: 6°58′2″N 158°12′41″E
- Area: 1 acre (0.40 ha)
- Built: 1921
- NRHP reference No.: 76002203
- Added to NRHP: September 30, 1976

The Japanese Elementary School for Ponapean Children is a historic school building in Kolonia, the capital of Pohnpei State in the Federated States of Micronesia. The surviving building is one of two reinforced concrete buildings, constructed c. 1920-21 by the Japanese authorities of the South Seas Mandate, which included the island of Pohnpei, then known as "Ponape". These buildings were the sole educational facility on the island for native children, those of Japanese dependents attending a separate, segregated facility. They were heavily damaged by bombing during World War II, with one of them being demolished and the other restored for use as part of the island's hospital.

The property was listed on the United States National Register of Historic Places, when Pohnpei was part of the US-administered Trust Territory of the Pacific Islands.
