= Malem, Ghent =

Neighbourhood of the city of Ghent, Belgium

Malem
- Neighbourhood of Ghent
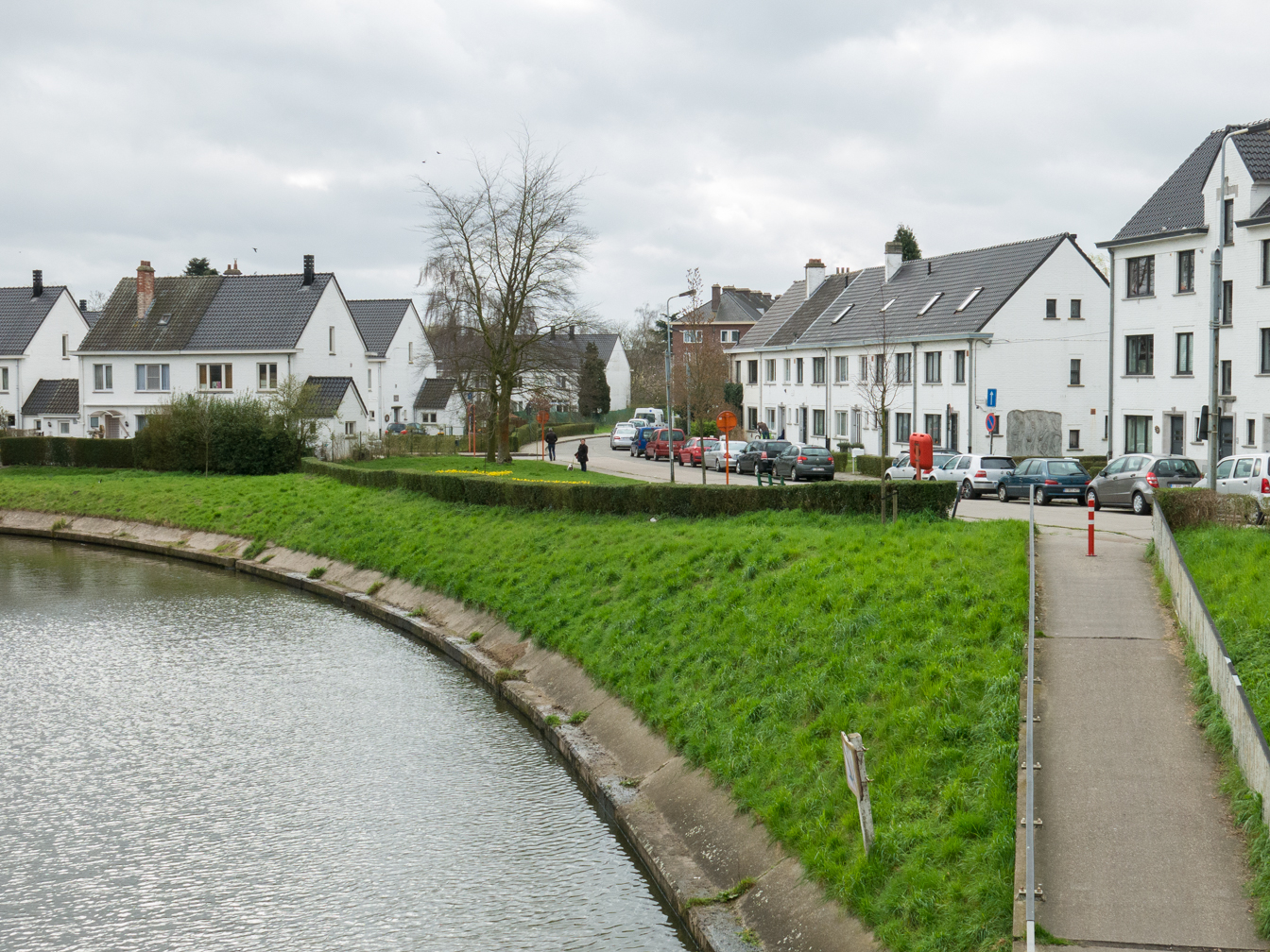
- View on Malem
- Interactive map of Malem
- Location within Belgium Location within East Flanders
- Coordinates: 51°03′08″N 3°41′41″E
- Country: Belgium
- Community: Flemish Community
- Region: Flemish Region
- Province: East Flanders
- Arrondissement: Ghent
- Municipality: Ghent

Population (2015)
  - Total: 1,300
- Postal codes: 9000
- Area codes: 09

Malem (Dutch pronunciation: [ˈmaːləm]) is a garden-city neighbourhood in the city of Ghent, Belgium. The neighbourhood was built between 1948 and 1953 in a very homogeneous garden-city idea, with uniform white houses, that were designed to house victims of World War II. The neighbourhood has kept its original character. The area is located on the west side of the Ghent agglomeration. In 2015, Malem had nearly 1,300 residents.
