= Sokehs rebellion =

1910–11 uprising against German rule in New Guinea

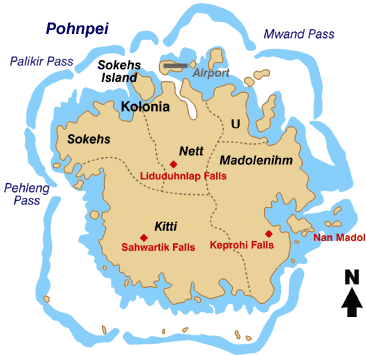
- Pohnpei: Sokehs Island and tribal area
Date	18 October 1910 – 22 February 1911
Location	Caroline Islands, German New Guinea
Result	Restoration of order, all 426 Sokeh tribal members exiled

Belligerents
German Empire: German New Guinea	Sokehs tribe

Commanders and leaders
(German Empire) Hermann Kersting (German Empire) Waldemar Vollerthun; Karl Kammerich	Samuel (executed)

Strength
c. 200 – assault team of sailors and Melanesian police 3 light cruisers 1 survey ship/transport	<50 armed rebels

Casualties and losses
Initial ambush: 4 Germans, 5 Melanesians killed Later skirmishes: 3 Germans, 2 Melanesians killed 6 Germans, 9 Melanesians wounded	6–10 killed 15 executed

The Sokehs rebellion was an uprising of the Sokehs tribe against local German rule that started on Sokehs Island off the main island of Pohnpei in the Eastern Caroline Islands (presently the Federated States of Micronesia) in 1910/1911. The German district commissioner, Gustav Boeder, three other German officials and five islanders were killed by the rebels before Imperial German Navy units arrived and restored order.

== History of the rebellion ==
Land ownership on Pohnpei was the exclusive domain of chiefs who would assign parcels of land to their indigenous tribal subjects in sharecropping fashion. Beginning in 1907 the German colonial administration began land reforms and required newly created owners to perform 15 days of labor per year for public works in lieu of taxes.

A group of Sokehs was detailed to roadwork on Sokehs Island on 17 October 1910. One young laborer refused work instructions of his overseer and was ordered flogged for his transgression, the punishment being carried out by a Melanesian policeman. That same evening, Samuel, a lower ranking section chief (Sou Madau en Sokehs [master of the ocean]), persuaded all in this work gang to refuse further labor. The next morning, 18 October 1910, when work was to commence, the Sokehs group threatened the two German overseers on the island, Otto Hollborn and Johann Häfner, who then fled to the Capuchin mission compound on Sokehs Island.

District commissioner Gustav Boeder was informed of the incident and together with his assistant Rudolf Brauckmann and two translators had his group rowed to the island by six Mortlock Islands boatmen to negotiate with the laborers. As Boeder approached the Sokehs workers, he was shot and killed by rifle fire from a concealed position. The rebels then killed Brauckmann, Häfner, Hollborn and 5 oarsmen; only the 2 translators and one oarsman escaped. After the news of the violent revolt reached the main settlement Kolonia on Pohnpei, Max Girschner, the colony's medical doctor and now senior official, requested the chiefs of the other 4 tribes on Pohnpei to provide men for defending Kolonia. The chiefs offered 600 warriors of whom several were then armed with rifles and bayonets in addition to their own weapons – but no attack on Kolonia occurred. Instead the rebelling Sokehs barricaded themselves at a defensive mountain hideout.

The remaining German officials had no access to cable or radio to request assistance. It was not until 26 November 1910 when the mail steamer Germania arrived, that a report could be made to the colony's headquarters at Rabaul. The Colonial Office in Berlin received the message on 26 December 1910.

== Response ==
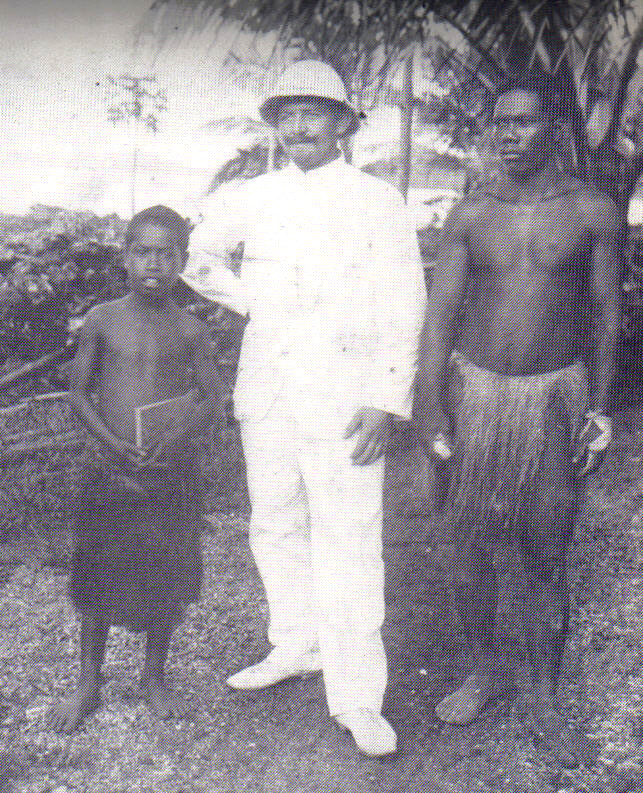
Police commander Karl Kammerich

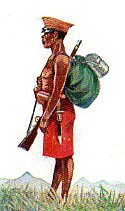
Police soldier of the German New Guinea constabulary round about 1910 in campaign dress, summer. Contemporary representation

Governor Albert Hahl at Rabaul dispatched the small cruiser Cormoran and the survey ship Planet with 163 newly hired Melanesian police recruits aboard. The ships arrived by mid-December 1910. Initial skirmishing by the police recruits had little success and their commander, police lieutenant Karl Kammerich was harshly critical of their performance.

The new light cruiser Emden had docked at Tsingtao in the Kiautschou Bay Leased Territory in China on 17 September 1910 after a journey from Germany and was the latest addition to the Imperial Navy's East Asia Squadron. The ship then made several show-the-flag cruises to Japan and Hong Kong and patrolled north Pacific island possessions of the German Empire. She was then scheduled for her first annual maintenance at Tsingtao. In response to the news from Pohnpei, the Berlin Admiralty ordered her commander to abandon the overhaul and proceed to the Caroline Islands. At the same time the light cruiser Nürnberg, anchored at Hong Kong, was to link up with Emden and both ships then arrived at Pohnpei on 10 January 1911. As the senior naval officer at the scene, Emden's captain, Lieutenant Commander Waldemar Vollerthun on 13 January 1911 ordered the main batteries of the cruisers to fire on the rebel fortification. Under the ad hoc command of territorial commissioner Hermann Kersting, an assault formation of sailors armed with rifles and 30 Melanesian police, led by naval Lieutenant Edgar von Spiegel from Cormoran and junior officers from Emden captured the hideout and forced the Sokehs to flee. Many escaped to mainland Pohnpei. The rebels fought using guerrilla tactics and offered bitter and stubborn resistance, but lack of food, non-cooperation by the other Pohnpei chiefs and tribes, and continual movement and flight exhausted the Sokehs warriors. On 13 February 1911 Samuel and five followers gave up. The remaining rebels surrendered on 22 February 1911. The cruisers departed the area on 1 March 1911 and arrived at their Tsingtao home base on 14 March 1911.

During the mountain assault and island campaign the German side suffered one junior officer, two ratings and two Melanesian policemen killed and one officer, five sailors and nine Melanesian policemen wounded. Sokehs losses are given at six killed, an unknown number wounded and missing.

== Trial and punishment ==
Immediately after cessation of fighting, a summary trial was convened for 36 rebels. The court convicted 17 for two main offenses: (a) the murder of four German officials and five island boatmen, and (b) for insurrection, and condemned them to death; 12 received multi-year sentences at hard labor, seven were acquitted and set free. On 24 February 1911, 15 rebels, including Samuel, were executed by a Melanesian police firing squad. Two of the condemned men ultimately did not receive the death penalty.

The colonial government banished the tribe of 426 Sokehs to Babelthuap in the German Palau Islands.

== Aftermath ==
The land reforms started by the German colonial officials were completed during the remaining years of German colonial rule, with compensation and continued superior status for the chiefs. Property borders were set by local tribal leaders and the scheme was accepted by the population.

In the early months of World War I, the Empire of Japan occupied all German islands north of the equator. The Japanese began in 1917 a limited return of the Sokehs to Pohnpei, well aware of their opposition to foreign occupation. The Treaty of Versailles assigned to Japan as mandatory power the administration of Pohnpei and all German islands that Japan had occupied. The Japanese concluded the return of the remaining Sokehs by 1927.

In the late 1980s, after independence, the government of the Federated States of Micronesia elevated the rebel leader, Samuel, to the status of a national hero. The anniversary of his execution, February 24th, is now a holiday; the mass grave of the fifteen insurgents in Kolonia is a national shrine.

== Literature ==
- Morlang, Thomas. Rebellion in der Südsee. Der Aufstand auf Ponape gegen die deutschen Kolonialherren 1910/1911 [Rebellion in the South Seas. The Uprising on Ponape against German Colonial Rule 1910/1911], 200 p. Berlin: Ch. Links Verlag, 2010. ISBN 978-3-86153-604-8
