= Chief Agriculturist House =

- U.S. National Register of Historic Places
- Location within Federated States of Micronesia
- Location: Kolonia, Pohnpei, Federated States of Micronesia
- Coordinates: 6°57′33″N 158°12′39″E
- Area: 0.3 acres (0.12 ha)
- Built: 1925
- NRHP reference No.: 76002200
- Added to NRHP: September 30, 1976

The Chief Agriculturist House is a historic house in Kolonia, the capital of Pohnpei State in the Federated States of Micronesia. It is a steel and concrete structure, built in the mid-1920s when Pohnpei and the other Caroline Islands were part of the Japanese South Seas Mandate. It was one of the highest-quality buildings constructed on Pohnpei during the Japanese administration, and was the home of the Japanese weatherman and agricultural overseer, said to be the second most powerful figure in Japanese Micronesia.

The house was listed on the United States National Register of Historic Places in 1976, at a time when Pohnpei was part of the US-administered Trust Territory of the Pacific Islands.
