= Dinay =

- Dinay Village
- U.S. National Register of Historic Places
- Interactive map of Dinay Village
- Location: Rull, Federated States of Micronesia
- Coordinates: 9°30′38.67″N 138°6′12.45″E
- Area: 14.8 acres (6.0 ha)
- NRHP reference No.: 04000276
- Added to NRHP: April 14, 2004

Dinay is a village belonging to the municipality of Rull in the southern part of the island of Yap in the Federated States of Micronesia. The village was added to the United States National Register of Historic Places in 2004. It is unique in Micronesia as the site of an ancient pottery complex, and is probably one of the earliest settlements on the island. The ancient village complex includes more than a dozen family platforms (daf) of such age that local folklore has forgotten their lineages, normally a significant cultural feature of such sites. The period of occupation is estimated to have been between about 3000 BCE and 1600 CE.
