= Japanese Hydro-electric Power Plant =

- U.S. National Register of Historic Places
- Location within Federated States of Micronesia
- Location: Kolonia, Pohnpei State, Federated States of Micronesia
- Coordinates: 6°57′35″N 158°12′24″E
- Area: 0.3 acres (0.12 ha)
- Built: 1926
- NRHP reference No.: 76002204
- Added to NRHP: September 30, 1976

The Japanese Hydro-electric Power Plant is a former hydroelectric power generation plant and historic site in Kolonia, the capital of Pohnpei State in the Federated States of Micronesia. The site is historically and culturally important as a representative of three different eras in the island's history. The site is important in the culture of Pohnpei as a location of high-quality stones gathered for use in ritual ceremonies involving the pounding of kava and drinking preparations from the plant. In the early 1900s, when Pohnpei was administered as part of German New Guinea, the German administration established an experimental forest, planting a diversity of trees from around the world, some of which continue to thrive in the area. Finally, in the 1920s, during the Japanese South Seas Mandate, a hydroelectric facility was built here. When the property was listed on the United States National Register of Historic Places in 1976 (during the US-administered Trust Territory of the Pacific Islands period) the concrete power plant building and water catchment basin survived.
