= Deke Sokehs =

Sokehs Peninsula
- Peninsula
- Flag

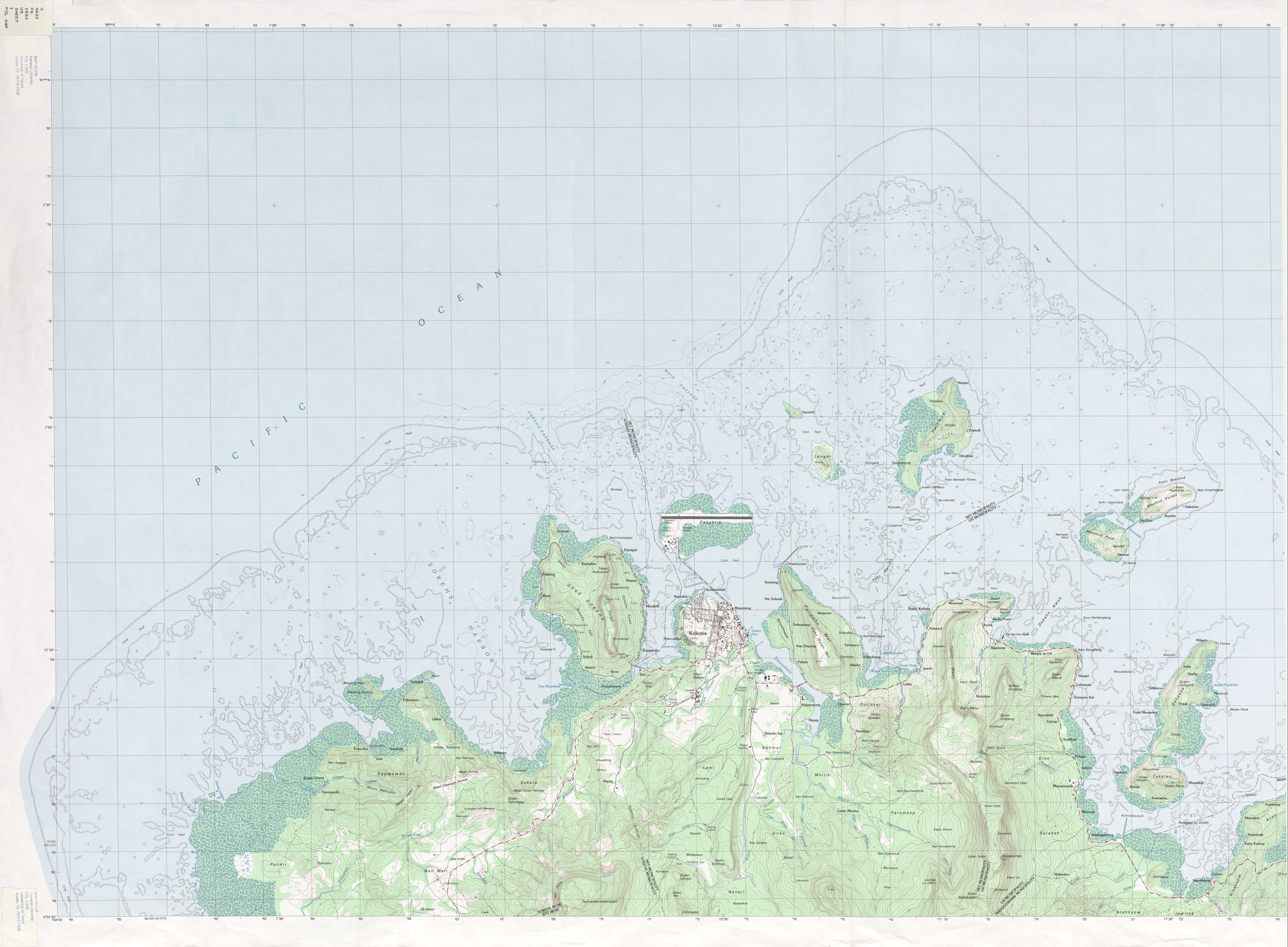
- Deke Sokehs on the map of norwest Pohnpei
- Coordinates: 6°58′N 158°11′E
- Country: Federated States of Micronesia
- State: (Pohnpei State) Pohnpei
- District: Sokehs
- Largest Village: Mwalok

Area
  - Total: 6.3 km^{2} (2.4 sq mi)

Dimensions
  - Length: 3.8 km (2.4 mi)
  - Width: 2.5 km (1.6 mi)

Population (2010)
  - Total: 200
  - Density: 32/km^{2} (82/sq mi)

Deke Sokehs, or Sokehs Peninsula, is a mountainous peninsula on the north coast of Pohnpei in the Federated States of Micronesia. It was formerly an island, known as Sokehs Island, but it is now connected to the main island by causeway and a field of mangroves. The 1570-meter-long Dau Mwoakote Channel cuts through the mangroves, which, except in the west, is only a few meters wide.

It belongs to Sokehs Municipality and lies to the west of Kolonia. Settlements from south to north include Reou, Ahseia, Soledi, Kamwele, Mwalok, Roie, Naneir, Peilong, Kepindau, and Danipei.

Sokehs is the location of Sokehs Rock, a prominent cliff face that is one of Micronesia's best-known geographic features. It was also the site of Sokehs Rebellion, an uprising by islanders in October 1910 against colonial German rule. The uprising was suppressed in early 1911, leading to the execution of 15 rebels and the exiling of several hundred Sokehs islanders to Palau.
