= Leluh archaeological site =

Coordinates: 5°19′57″N 163°1′30″E

- Leluh Ruins
- U.S. National Register of Historic Places
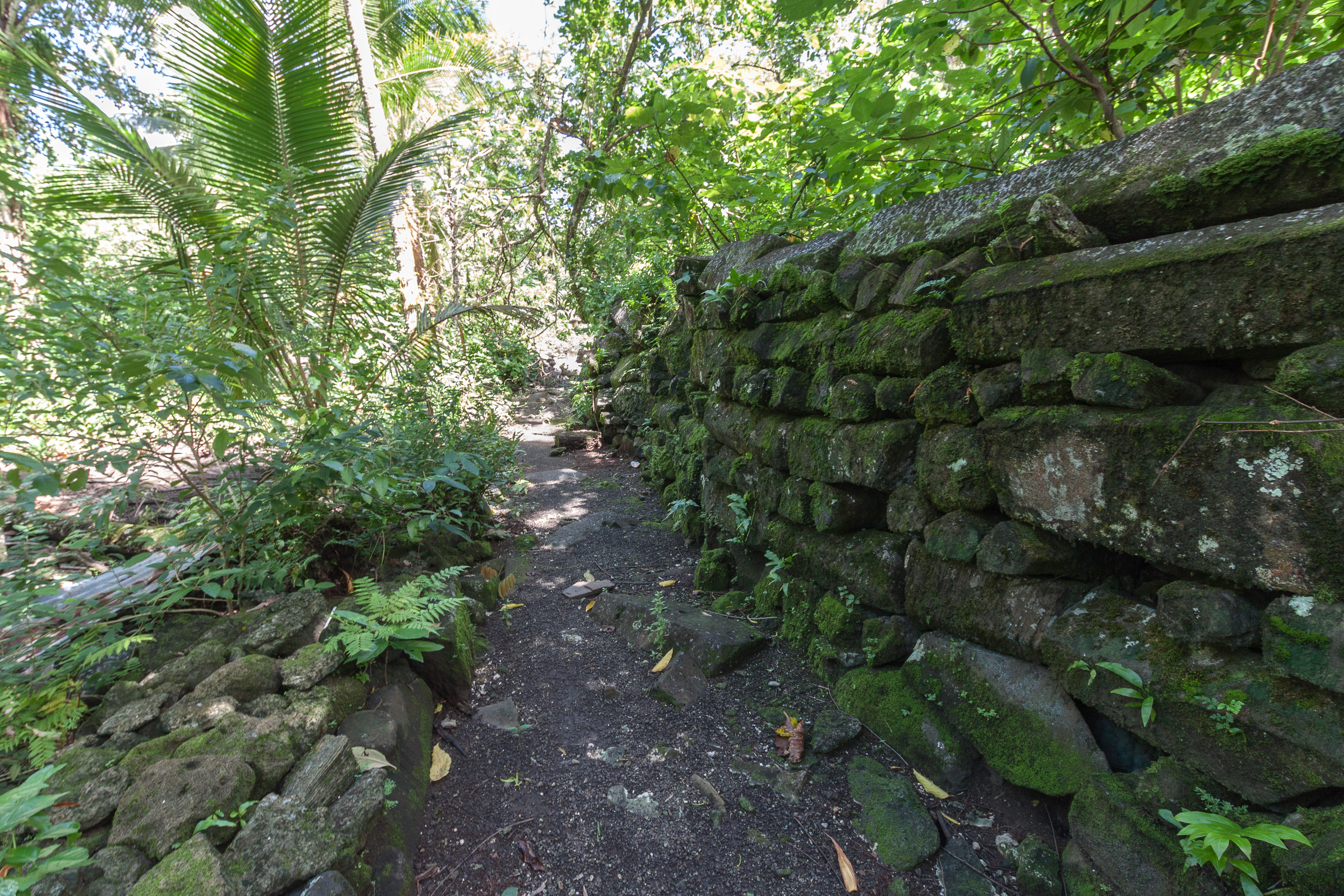
- Nearest city: Lelu Island, Federated States of Micronesia
- Area: 173 acres (70 ha)
- NRHP reference No.: 83004524
- Added to NRHP: August 16, 1983

Leluh is a major prehistoric and historic archaeological site, encompassing the remains of a city on Lelu Island, a satellite of the larger island of Kosrae in the Federated States of Micronesia. The remains are those of a civilization that peaked around the 14th and 15th centuries, with elements still visible at the time of European contact in the early 19th century.

The rulers of Leluh gradually conquered and thus unified the island of Kosrae. From the capital at Leluh, they ruled the island with a monarchy that archaeologists believe was similar to the kingdoms of Tonga or Hawaii.

The city itself is built of blocks of coral and basalt. It consists of housing, royal tombs and sacred spaces. Housing regrouped the king, his family, the high and low aristocracy and of course the commoner population. The materials used for the construction of housing depended on social class, as did the spatial situation of the people: in the center the King and the aristocracy behind high walls of basalt (similar to those of Nan Madol), to the west, the lower aristocracy in modest houses of coral, and the rest of the population in simple huts.

At the time of European contact, the population of Kosrae was estimated at 6,000 persons; it dropped to 200 in 1870. In the wake of increased settlement, materials of the city were recycled for other uses over the 20th century.

The site was listed on the United States National Register of Historic Places in 1983.

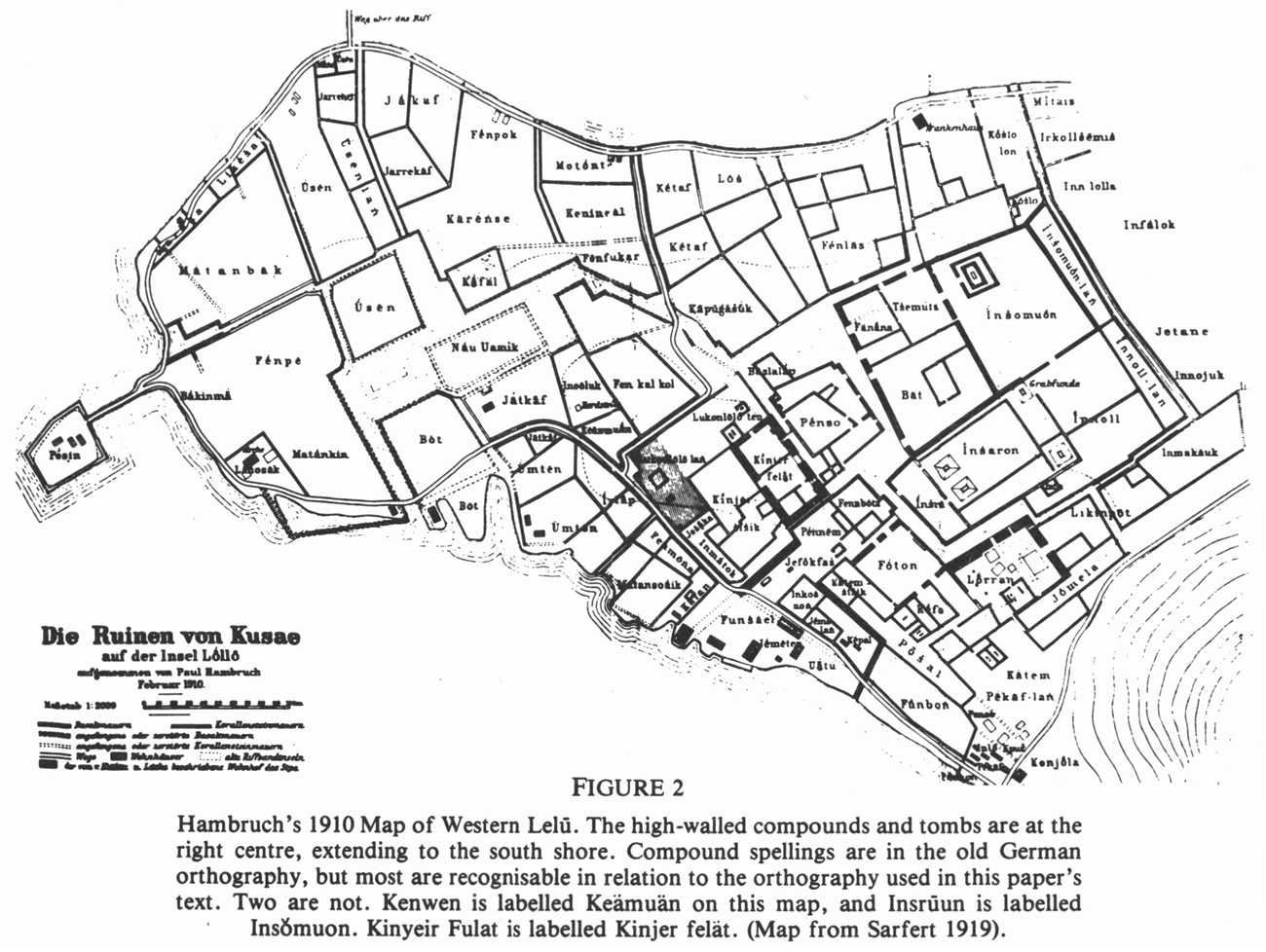
Lelu - archaeological map
