= Malem, Federated States of Micronesia =

Municipality in Korsae

Coordinates: 5.289°N 163.024°E

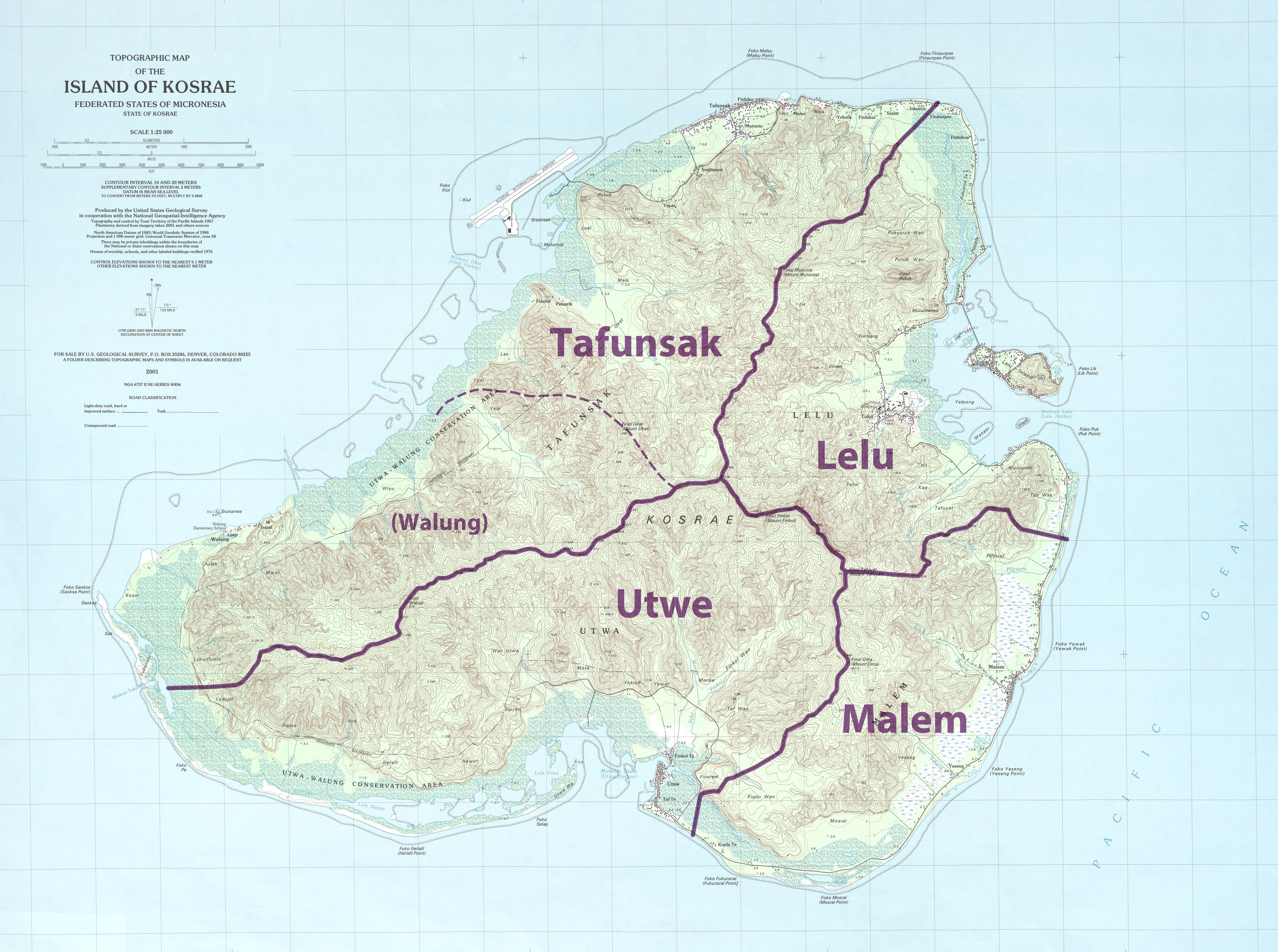
Malem is in the southeast

Malem, which literally translates to "Moon", is one of the four municipalities that comprise the state of Kosrae in the Federated States of Micronesia.

The village gets its name from the fact that the full moon rises every month out of the ocean directly in front of the beach at the edge of the town, starting from the far north. Malem has an elementary school housing close to 400 students in grades KG-8. It also features a small Baptist church, a large Congregational church (the predominant religion on the island), and a municipality office. Malem is also known in Kosrae for its good-tasting fish and surfing waves. Compared to the other villages, Malem has a unique history during the WW2, when the Japanese forcibly evacuated the village to use the land for farming. Malem has the largest flat land between the mountains and the shore, and that is where most of the villagers live. Villagers use this flat and marshy land for farming and fishing.

== Education ==
Kosrae State Department of Education operates Malem Elementary School. High school students attend Kosrae High School in Tofol, Lelu municipality.

== Climate ==
Malem has a tropical rainforest climate (Af) with very heavy rainfall year-round.

Climate data for Malem
Month	Jan	Feb	Mar	Apr	May	Jun	Jul	Aug	Sep	Oct	Nov	Dec	Year
Mean daily maximum °C (°F)	30.1 (86.2)	30.1 (86.2)	30.1 (86.2)	30.1 (86.2)	30.1 (86.2)	30.1 (86.2)	30.3 (86.5)	30.7 (87.3)	30.6 (87.1)	30.8 (87.4)	30.6 (87.1)	30.2 (86.4)	30.3 (86.6)
Daily mean °C (°F)	27.4 (81.3)	27.4 (81.3)	27.4 (81.3)	27.3 (81.1)	27.3 (81.1)	27.2 (81.0)	27.2 (81.0)	27.5 (81.5)	27.3 (81.1)	27.6 (81.7)	27.4 (81.3)	27.4 (81.3)	27.4 (81.3)
Mean daily minimum °C (°F)	24.8 (76.6)	24.7 (76.5)	24.7 (76.5)	24.5 (76.1)	24.5 (76.1)	24.4 (75.9)	24.1 (75.4)	24.3 (75.7)	24.1 (75.4)	24.4 (75.9)	24.3 (75.7)	24.6 (76.3)	24.5 (76.0)
Average rainfall mm (inches)	402 (15.8)	490 (19.3)	504 (19.8)	586 (23.1)	493 (19.4)	454 (17.9)	448 (17.6)	416 (16.4)	383 (15.1)	344 (13.5)	415 (16.3)	512 (20.2)	5,447 (214.4)
Source: Climate-Data.org

== Notable people ==
- Adelyn Noda - teacher and deaconess
