= Maap =

Municipality in Yap, Federated States of Micronesia

Coordinates: 9.601°N 138.165°E

- island and village
- Interactive map of Maap
- Country: Federated States of Micronesia
- State: Yap

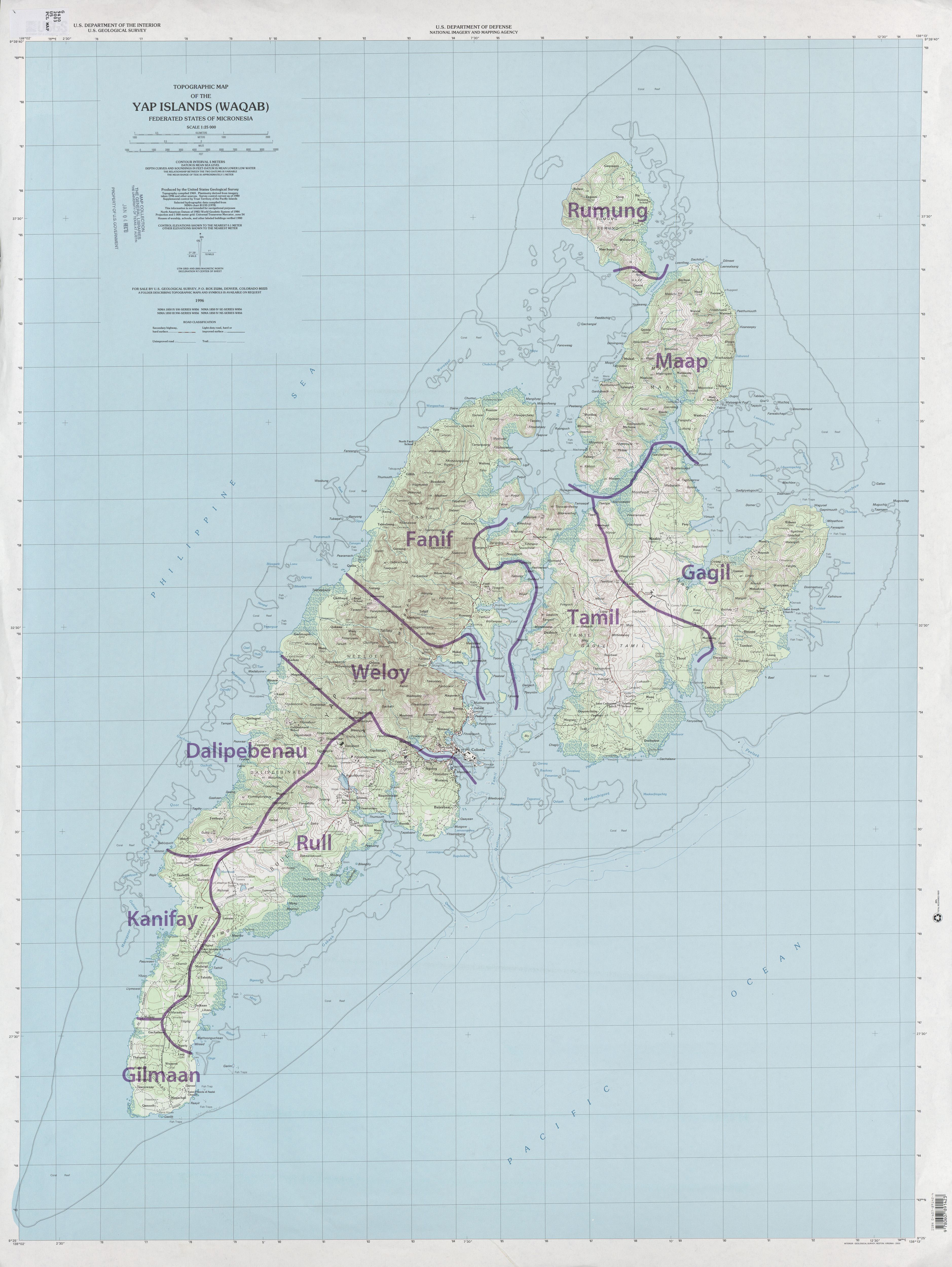
Map of the municipalities of Yap including Maap

Maap (Yapese: Maap′) is an island and village and municipality in the state of Yap, Federated States of Micronesia. It lies on the north east of the archipelago of Yap.

Maap, Yap, Federated States of Micronesia

Climate chart (precipitation, max. and min. temperature)
J	F	M	A	M	J	J	A	S	O	N	D
5.9 86 77	6 86 77	4.8 87 77	5.4 88 78	7.9 88 78	11 88 77	14 87 76	15 87 76	13 87 76	11 87 76	8.9 88 77	8.6 87 77
- █ Average max. and min. temperatures in °F
- █ Precipitation totals in inches
- Source: 1981-2010 provisional normals
Metric conversion
J	F	M	A	M	J	J	A	S	O	N	D
151 30 25	151 30 25	122 31 25	136 31 25	200 31 26	267 31 25	345 31 24	389 30 24	341 31 24	275 31 25	227 31 25	218 30 25
- █ Average max. and min. temperatures in °C
- █ Precipitation totals in mm
