= Kosrae High School =

Location
- Tofol, Kosrae; Micronesia
- Coordinates: 05°19′35″N 163°00′33″E

Information
- Type: High school
- School district: Kosrae State Department of Education
- Website: kosrae.doe.fm/index.php/schools/kosrae-high-school

Kosrae High School (KHS) is a secondary school in Tofol, Lelu municipality, Kosrae State, Federated States of Micronesia. It is a part of the Kosrae State Department of Education and is the island's sole high school.

It opened in the 1960s. Its original facility was built between the late 1960s to the middle of the 1970s, a period when several other public high schools were built in the Trust Territory of the Pacific Islands. It was first built in Yekula. In 2010 its current building opened.

Originally KHS was a boarding school.

== Notable people ==
- Adelyn Noda - educator and deaconess.

== See also ==
- Education in the Federated States of Micronesia
