= Tofol =

Capital of Kosrae, Federal States of Micronesia

Coordinates: 05°19′33″N 163°00′31″E

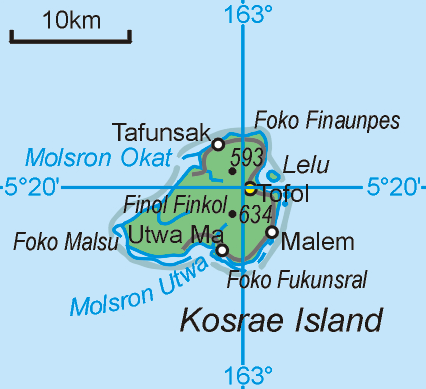
Map of Kosrae State. Tofol is shown in yellow.

Tofol village in Lelu Town municipality is the seat of government of the state of Kosrae in Micronesia, according to the provisions of the Kosrae State Code, Title 2, Chap. 2. It is the most easterly point of Micronesia.

== Location ==
Tofol is in Lelu municipality, located almost directly southwest of Lelu Island.

== Education ==
Kosrae State Department of Education operates public schools:

- Kosrae High School
