= Lelu, Federated States of Micronesia =

Lelu (leh-Loh) Lelu
- Town
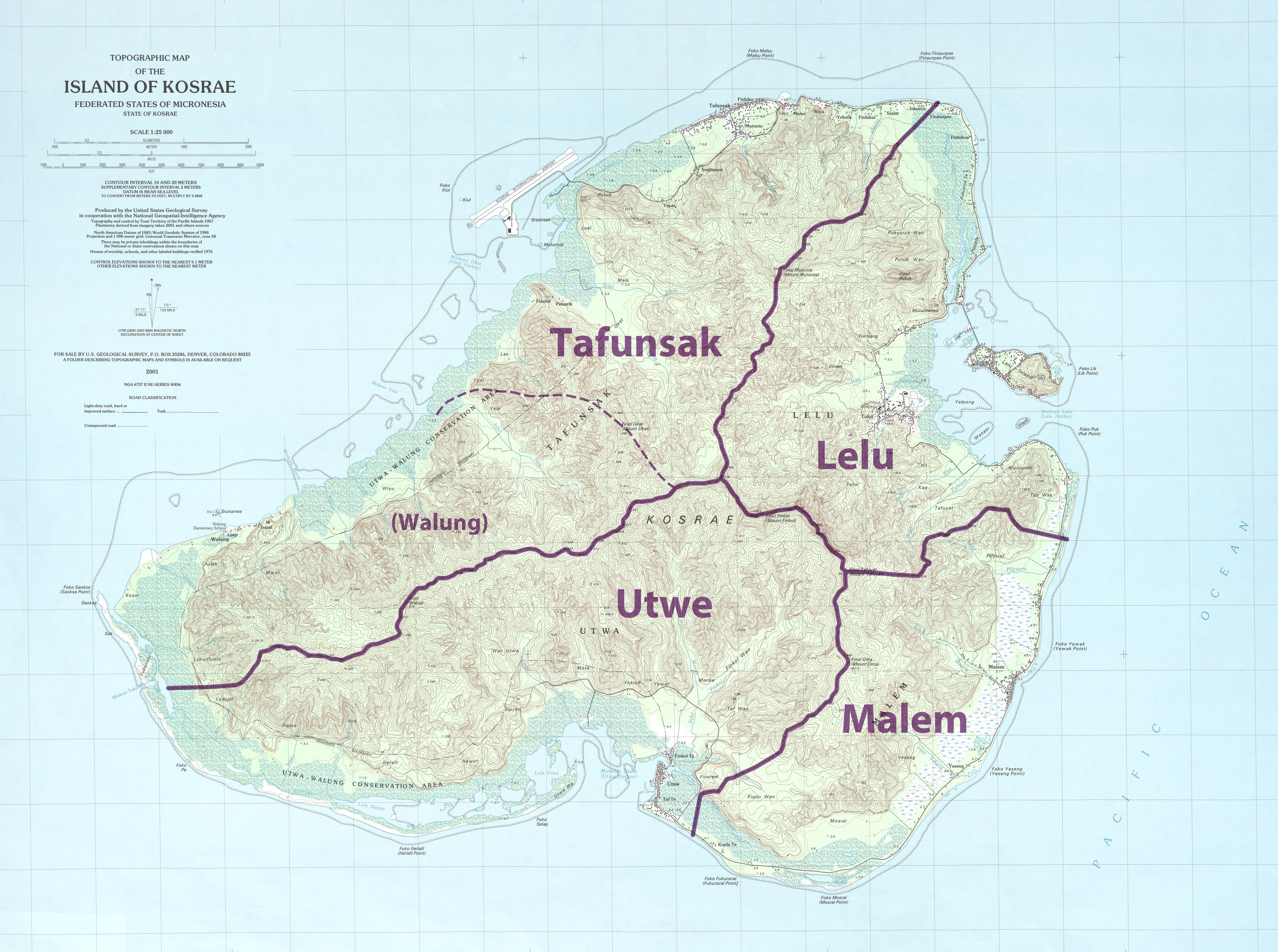
- Lelu is in the northeast
- Coordinates: 5°19′56″N 163°01′22″E
- Country: Federated States of Micronesia
- State: Kosrae

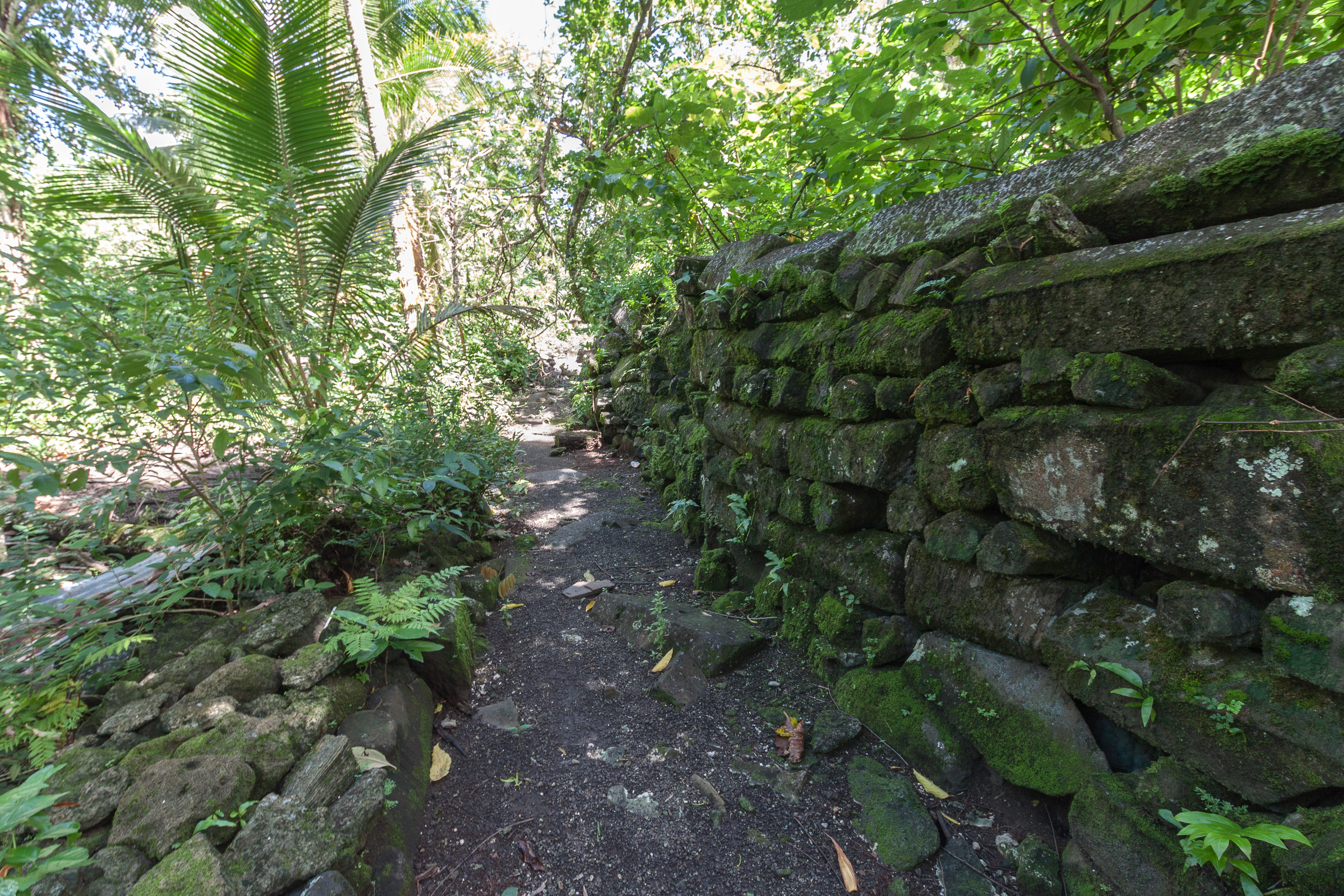
Lelu Ruins

Lelu or Lelu Town is a municipality of the state of Kosrae, in the Federated States of Micronesia.

The municipality of Lelu consists of Lelu Island (a small satellite island of Kosrae Island) and a big part of the northeastern portion of Kosrae Island. Its capital is Lelu Village, located on Lelu island. Another village in the municipality, on Kosrae Island, is Tofol, the capital of the state of Kosrae. Lelu was established as a town in January 1989.

== Education ==
Kosrae State Department of Education operates public schools in the municipality:

- Kosrae High School (Tofol)
- Lelu Elementary School (Lelu Island)
- Sansrihk Elementary School - Lelu Municipality

== Climate ==
Lelu has a tropical rainforest climate (Af) with very heavy rainfall year-round.

Climate data for Lelu
Month	Jan	Feb	Mar	Apr	May	Jun	Jul	Aug	Sep	Oct	Nov	Dec	Year
Mean daily maximum °C (°F)	30.2 (86.4)	30.2 (86.4)	30.1 (86.2)	30.0 (86.0)	30.2 (86.4)	30.3 (86.5)	30.3 (86.5)	30.7 (87.3)	30.7 (87.3)	30.8 (87.4)	30.6 (87.1)	30.3 (86.5)	30.4 (86.7)
Daily mean °C (°F)	27.4 (81.3)	27.4 (81.3)	27.4 (81.3)	27.3 (81.1)	27.3 (81.1)	27.2 (81.0)	27.2 (81.0)	27.5 (81.5)	27.3 (81.1)	27.6 (81.7)	27.4 (81.3)	27.4 (81.3)	27.4 (81.3)
Mean daily minimum °C (°F)	24.8 (76.6)	24.8 (76.6)	24.7 (76.5)	24.5 (76.1)	24.6 (76.3)	24.5 (76.1)	24.2 (75.6)	24.3 (75.7)	24.2 (75.6)	24.3 (75.7)	24.4 (75.9)	24.7 (76.5)	24.5 (76.1)
Average rainfall mm (inches)	399 (15.7)	485 (19.1)	500 (19.7)	583 (23.0)	491 (19.3)	453 (17.8)	446 (17.6)	415 (16.3)	383 (15.1)	344 (13.5)	414 (16.3)	510 (20.1)	5,423 (213.5)
Source: Climate-Data.org
