= Kosrae =

- State
- Flag Seal
- Anthem: An Kosrae (Kosraean)
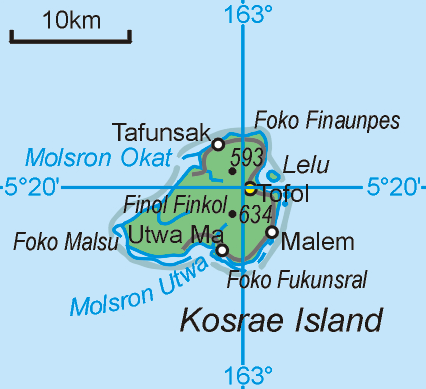
- Map of Kosrae

- Kosrae in the Federated States of Micronesia

- Location of Kosrae
- Coordinates: 5°19′N 162°59′E
- Country: Federated States of Micronesia
- Capital: Tofol

Government
  - Governor: Tulensa Palik (since 2023)

Area
  - Total: 111.3 km^{2} (43.0 sq mi)
- Elevation: 634 m (2,080 ft)

Population (2023)
  - Total: 5,092
  - Density: 45.75/km^{2} (118.5/sq mi)
- Time zone: UTC+11
- ISO 3166 code: FM-KSA

Kosrae (/koʊˈʃaɪ/ koh-SHY), formerly known as Kusaie or Strong's Island, is an island in the Caroline Islands archipelago, and state within the Federated States of Micronesia. It includes the main island of Kosrae, traditionally known as Ualung (which means the "high island"), and a few intercoastal islands and islets, the most significant of which (Lelu Island) is inhabited by 1,500 people.

Kosrae's land area is 110 square kilometers (42 square miles), making it the smallest state by area. Sustaining 6,600 people, it is also the smallest by population. Tofol is the state capital, and Mount Finkol is the highest point at 634 meters (2,080 feet).

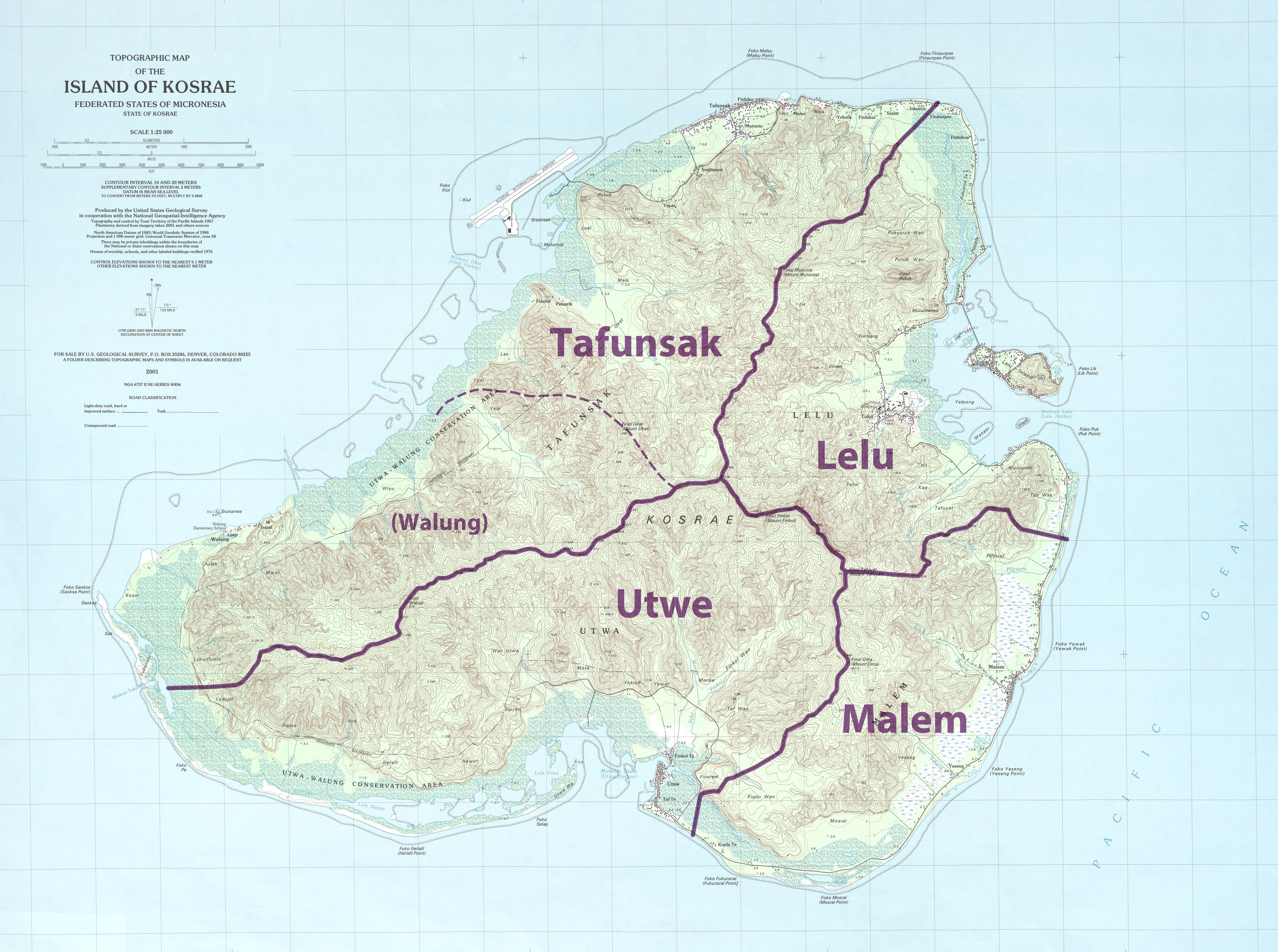
Detailed map of Kosrae

== History ==
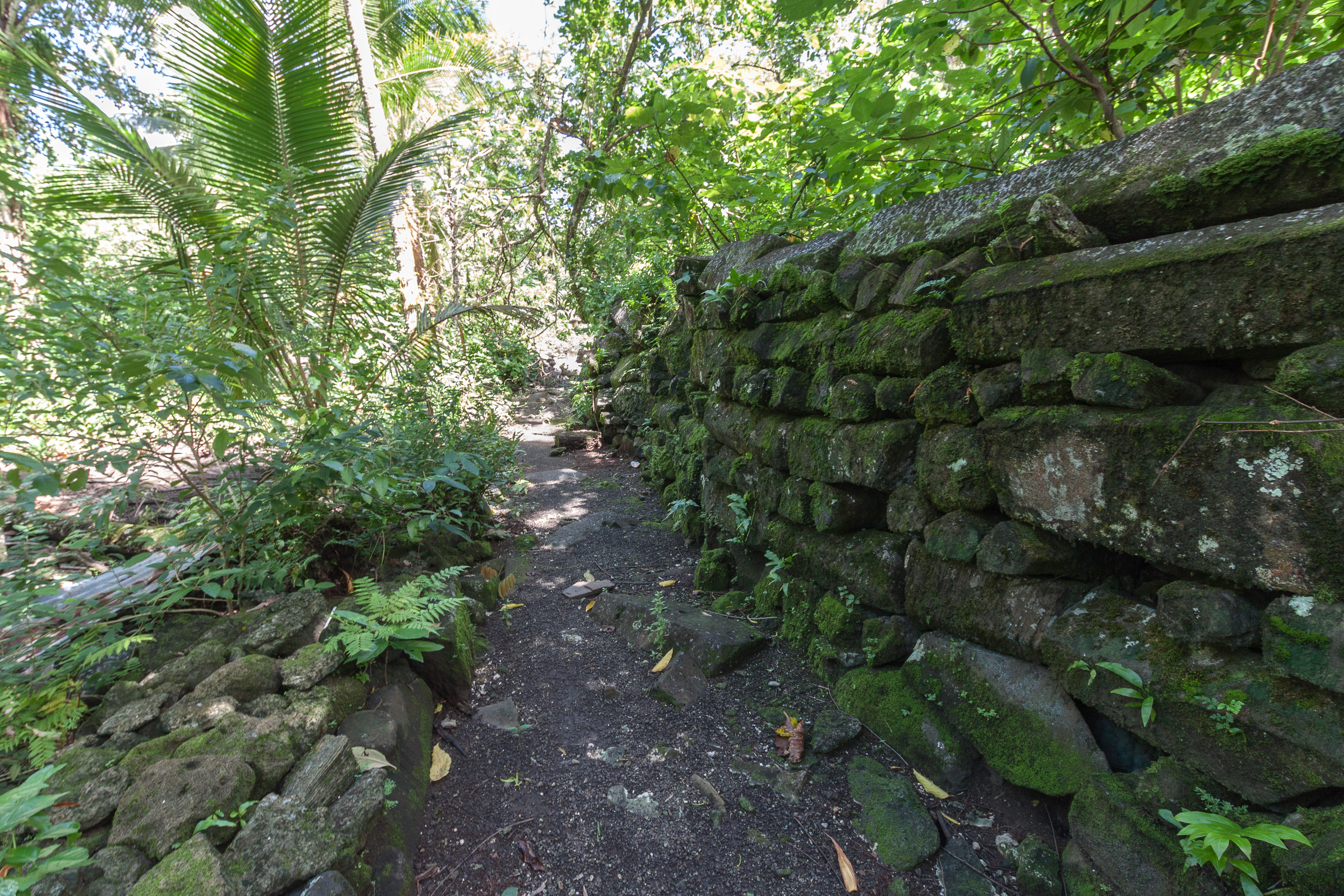
Ruined city of Leluh

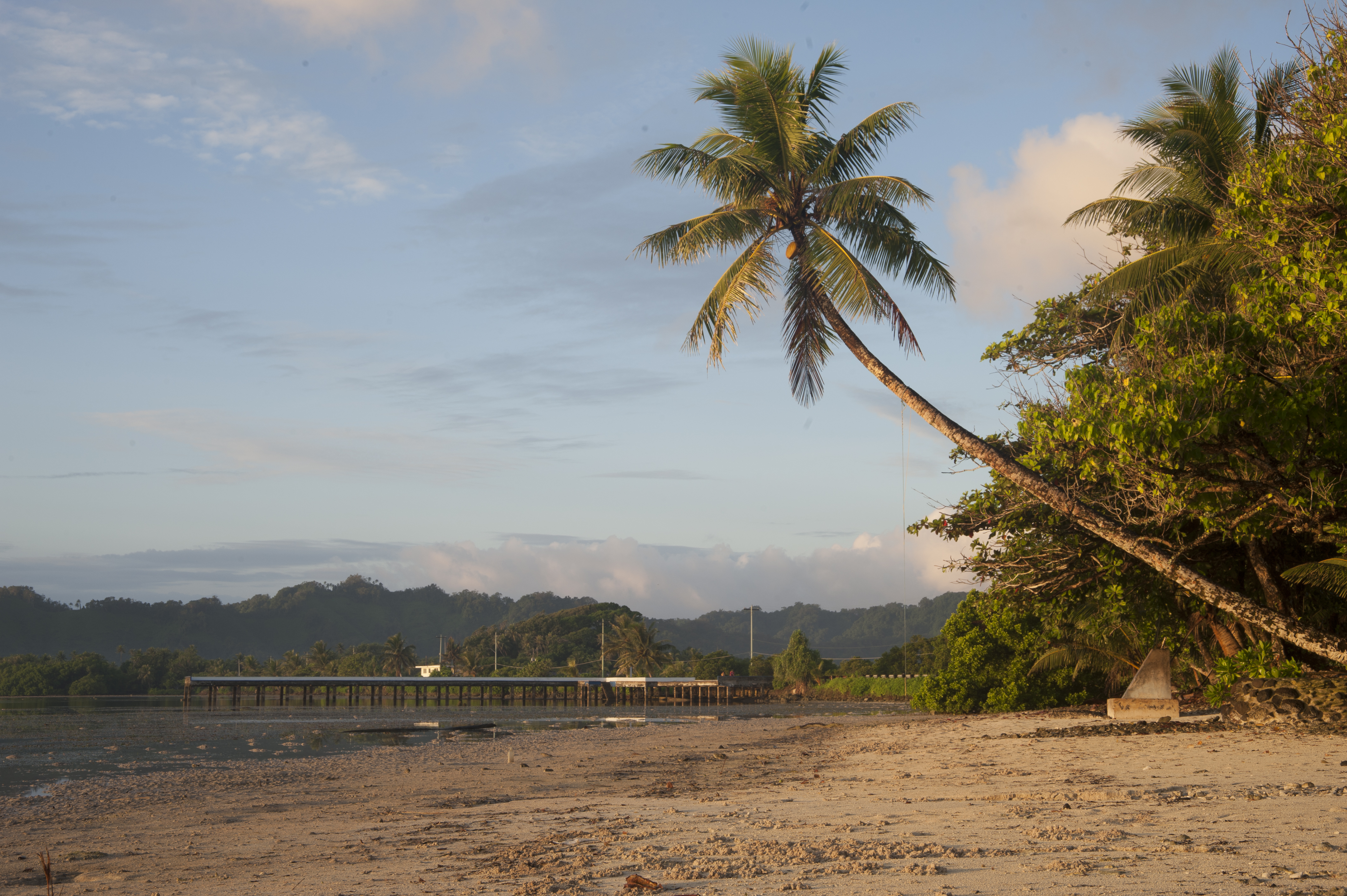
Kosrae 2015

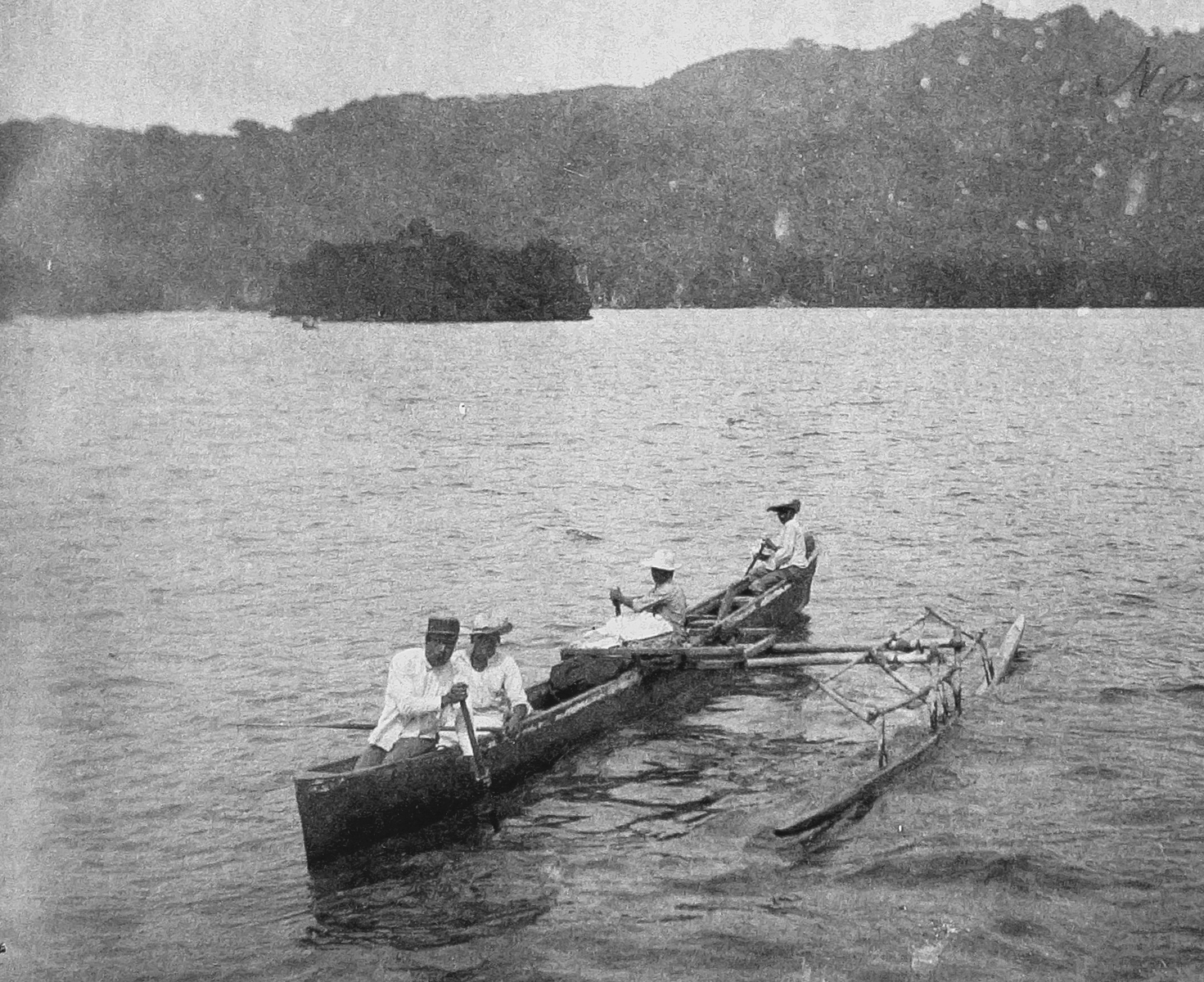
Native canoe at Port Lottin (1899–1900)

Archaeological evidence shows that the island was settled at least by the early years of the first millennium AD. This includes the city of Leluh that existed from about 1250 to 1850 AD, and in its heyday had a population of about 1,500 and covered some 27 hectares (67 acres). It featured burial pyramids for the nobility.

=== French visitors ===
The French corvette S. M. La Coquille, arrived at Okat Harbor on 3 June 1824 and visited until 15 June 1824. Commanded by Louis-Isidore Duperrey, La Coquille, on its circumnavigation of the earth (1822–1825) with Jules Dumont d'Urville as second. René-Primevère Lesson also traveled on Coquille as a naval doctor and naturalist. La Coquille anchored in Kosrae for ten days. During this visit, several crew walked across the island and visited the island of Lelu.

=== Spanish colonization ===
The first recorded sighting by Westerners was by the Spanish navigator Álvaro de Saavedra on 14 September 1529 when trying to return from Tidore to New Spain. The island was under nominal Spanish sovereignty since 1668, but it was not effectively occupied until 1885. By the time of the island's first contact with European travelers in 1824, Kosrae had a highly stratified society, typical of the surrounding islands of the time. Its cultural features included matrilineal lineage and clans, with a feudal structure of "nobles" controlling land worked by "commoners" and settlements consisting of small groups of close relatives sharing a single cook house.

The first missionary post was established by Congregationalists in 1852, and virtually the whole island had converted to Christianity by the 1870s. Today, many sects of Christianity are represented on Kosrae, and religion still plays an integral role in culture.

The notorious captain and blackbirder Bully Hayes was shipwrecked on Kosrae on March 15, 1874, when his ship Leonora was caught in Utwe harbor during a storm. Bully Hayes made his home in Utwe for seven months, during which he terrorized the local people. In September 1874, HMS Rosario (under the command of Captain Dupuis) arrived to investigate the claims against Hayes. He was arrested, but then escaped in a 14-foot boat, built of timber from the wreck of the Leonora. His treasure may have been left behind, buried somewhere in the forest, although subsequent diggings have failed to uncover it. The existence of this buried money is part of the myths that surround Hayes.

In 1885, after a dispute known as the Carolines Question between the Spanish Empire and the German Empire, finally resolved under the arbitration of Pope Leo XIII, the Spanish Navy took effective control of the island.

=== German and Japanese rule (1899–1945) ===
After the Spanish–American War of 1898, the defeated Spanish sold the Caroline Islands to Germany for 25 million pesetas (17 million German marks). The islands subsequently came under the control of the Empire of Japan during World War I.

Extensive economic improvements took place during the Japanese South Seas Mandate that lasted from 1919 until 1947. The island was practically run by a few missionaries who converted the population; Willard Price, when he visited in the 1930s, reported that the island had no jail, there had been no murders in sixty years, and alcohol and tobacco were unheard of. The island was fortified by the Japanese during World War II, but no battles occurred on Kosrae. The Japanese garrison commanded by Lieutenant-General Yoshikazu Harada consisted of 3,811 IJA men including a company of tanks and 700 IJN men. Tunnel bunkers that have multiple entrances were dug into the island's interior peaks and most can still be explored today.

=== United States rule (1945) ===
The island became part of the vast US Naval Base Marshall Islands. In 1945, administration over Kosrae passed to the United States, which ruled the island as part of the Trust Territory of the Pacific Islands. Aid and investment increased from the 1960s.

During the Trust Territory (TTPI) period, Kosrae was initially administered as one of the municipalities of the Ponape (Pohnpei) District, but in 1977 became a separate district. When the Micronesian constitution was defeated in the TTPI districts of Palau and the Marshall Islands, Kosrae joined the remaining districts (Yap, Chuuk and Pohnpei) to form the Federated States of Micronesia (FSM). Kosrae is the only single-island FSM state (whereby the seven or eight small nearshore islands within the fringing reef, most importantly Lelu Island, are subsumed under the main island), while the other three states are each composed of many islands.

Until 1977, Kosrae was subdivided into districts or villages at the sub-municipality level:

1. Lelu (consisting of Lelu Island only)
2. Yetanleluh. sometimes referred to as Neminleluh (mainland part of today's Lelu municipality with Tofol, the state capital)
3. Tafunsak (roughly corresponding to today's Tafunsak municipality)
4. Malem (roughly corresponding to today's Malem municipality)
5. Utwe (roughly corresponding to today's Utwe municipality)

By 1980, five municipalities had been created from the former villages or districts:

1. Lelu (the villages of Lelu district (island) and Yetanleluh)
2. Tafunsak (the northeastern part of Ualung or Tafunsak district)
3. Walung (the southwestern part of Tafunsak district)
4. Malem (eastern part of Ualung or Malem district)
5. Utwe (the southern part of Ualung or Utwe district)

The number of municipalities has subsequently been reduced to four (by integrating Walung into Tafunsak).

== Geography ==
Location of Kosrae in the Pacific Ocean

Kosrae, the easternmost of the Caroline Islands, has a population of 6,616 (2010 census). It is located approximately 600 km (370 mi) north of the equator, between Guam and the Hawaiian Islands. It has a land area of approximately 110 km^{2} (42 sq mi). Some parts of the island are experiencing coastal erosion.

Kosrae is a volcanic island that is largely unspoiled. It is becoming a destination for scuba divers and hikers. The coral reefs that surround the island are kept in pristine condition through an extensive mooring buoy system, installed and maintained by concerned expat dive operators with the help of the government's Marine Resources office. The reefs are largely untouched, and contain miles of hard corals, some said to be thousands of years old.

Kosrae International Airport (IATA code KSA) is located on an artificial island within the fringing reef about 150 meters (490 feet) from the coast and is connected to the main island by a new bridge that opened to the public in January 2016. It is served by United Airlines (formerly Continental Micronesia) Island Hopper 737-800 flights (twice a week in each direction) between Hawaii and Guam, stopping at other FSM (Pohnpei and Chuuk) and Marshallese destinations on the way.

There is one significant nearshore island within the fringing reef around Kosrae, which is Lelu Island, and it is only 2 square kilometers (3/4 square mile) in area, but with a population of around 1,500. It belongs to Lelu municipality, which includes the area around Tofol, the state capital. Other very small, uninhabited islands within the fringing reef are, Yen Yen and Yenasr (also in Lelu municipality), the airport island, Kiul, Mutunyal, Sroansak (Tafunsak municipality), and Srukames (also Tafunsak municipality, Walung part).

=== Municipalities ===
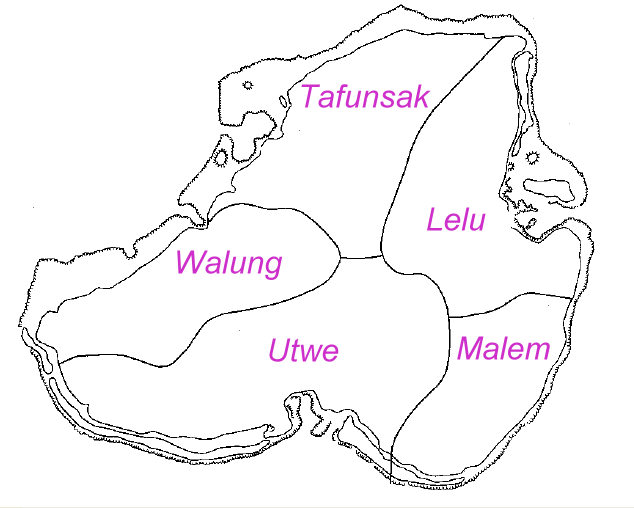
Kosrae municipalities of 1980 Walung was absorbed by Tafunsak subsequently

Kosrae State is subdivided into four municipalities.

Of the originally five municipalities of 1980, Walung was subsequently absorbed by Tafunsak.

Municipality	Area km^{2}	Population (Census 1980)	Population (Census 2010)	remarks
Lelu	21.5	1,995	2,160	
Malem	16.8	1,091	1,300	
Utwe	28.5	912	983	
Tafunsak	23.3	1,342	2,173	
Walung	19.5	151	part of Tafunsak	
Kosrae	109.6	5,491	6,616	

The capital of the state is Tofol, in Lelu municipality.

== Politics and government ==
Kosrae is one of the four federal states of the Federated States of Micronesia, a democratic federation. Each state in the country has the ability to retain a large number of powers within their territory as well as a certain level of sovereignty typical of federal administrative divisions. The chief executive of Kosrae is the governor. Kosrae has a unicameral legislature.

== Economy ==
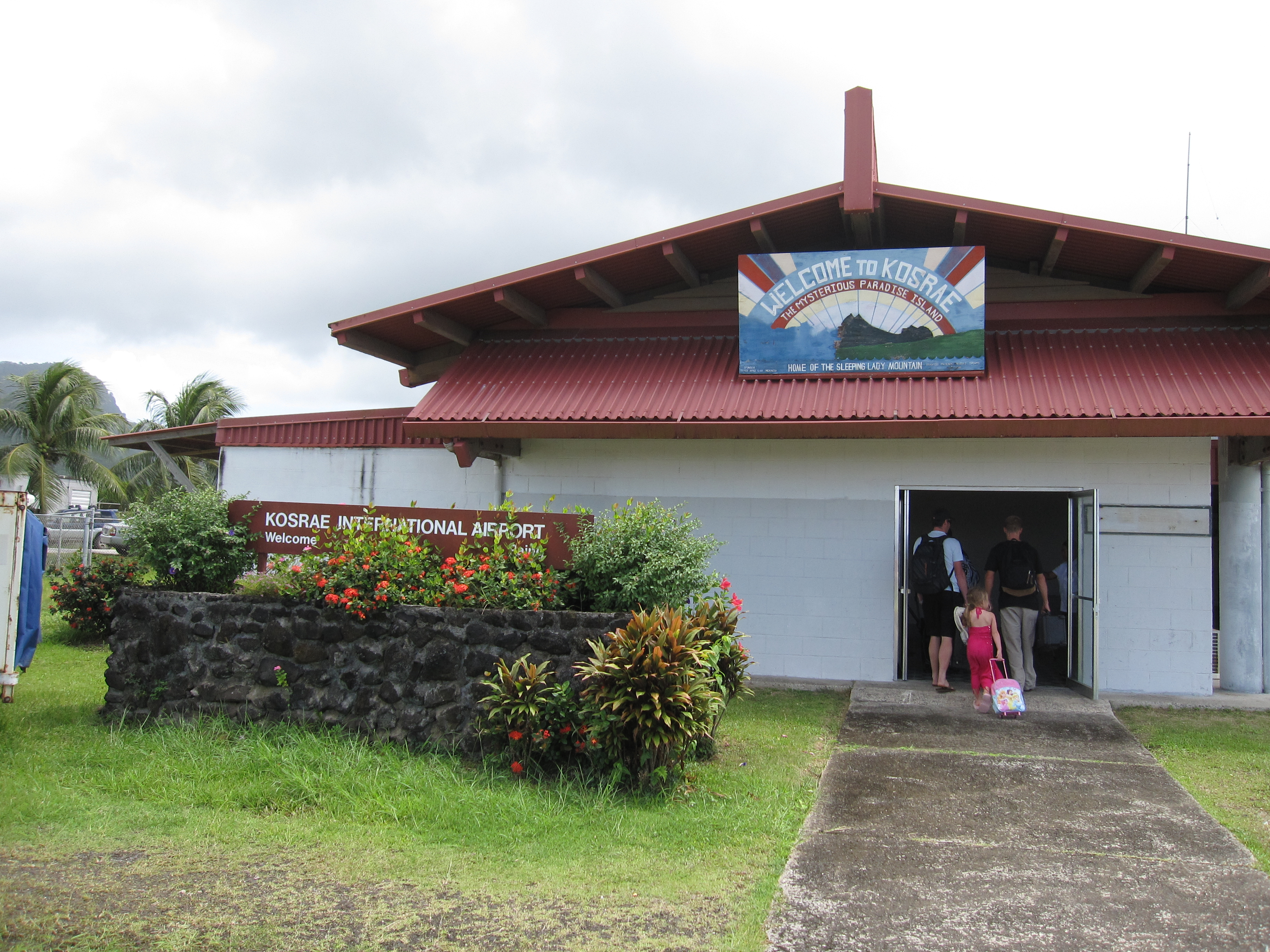
Kosrae Airport

In early times, a system of exchange based on sea shells existed on Kosrae, although little is currently known about how it operated.

Since the 1960s, the Kosraean government has become the main employer on the island, where fishing and traditional farming remain the main source of the islanders' subsistence. Imports have replaced almost all other native manufactures. The U.S dollar is the official currency used in Kosrae and throughout Micronesia.

The tourism industry to date has mainly centered around scuba diving on the coral reef that rings the island. Surfing, hiking and stand up paddle-boarding through the extensive mangrove system is growing in popularity. The annual 10-kilometer (6 1/4-mile) Rockhopper running race commenced in 2013 and attracts several dozen competitors from the nearby islands of Kwajalein and Pohnpei.

=== Resort sold by raffle ===
In July 2016, the Kosrae Nautilus Resort was won in a raffle promoted worldwide. The previous owners, Doug and Sally Beitz, were persuaded by family to conduct the raffle rather than sell the resort, ahead of returning to Australia. The winner, Joshua, is from the state of New South Wales, Australia. Joshua will become owner of a resort, which is free of debt, profitable and has more than 20 years remaining on its lease.

== Education ==
The Kosrae Department of Education (DOE) operates six public elementary schools (Tafunsak Elementary School, Malem Elementary School, Utwe Elementary School, Lelu Elementary School, Sansrik Elementary School, Walung Elementary School) and one high school (Kosrae High School). There is also one private school (Kosrae Seventh-day Adventist School). In July 2011, Kosrae DOE embraced the One Laptop per Child program, distributing 720 "XO" computers to children in its public elementary schools, becoming the first State of Micronesia to do so.

== Languages ==
The official language of Kosrae is Kosraean, although the English language may also be used in government discourse. According to the Constitution of Kosrae, English is held to have "equal authority" to Kosraean (although in an instance where the Kosraean and English versions of the Constitution are held to be in irresolvable conflict, the Kosraean version prevails). Spanish language is also studied and spoken in Kosrae.

== Food ==
Traditional foods have included breadfruit, coconut, banana, taro, yam, and sugarcane. Breadfruit was the usual staple food, and it was preserved in leaf-lined pits for times of scarcity. Coconuts were reserved for nobles.

Food was a central part of island life, since each settlement consisted of small family groups gathered around a cook house containing at least one earth oven. Soft taro was made into a feast food called fahfah by men trained in the elaborate skills needed to prepare it properly, who also prepared suhka (Kava). Brewed from the roots of a mountain plant, Suhka was served to members of the nobility. Fish were harvested mainly from the lagoon using nets.

- Today food for most families consists of imported rice and tinned meats and fish, combined with fresh local fish and root crops. Even today, fahfah and pork are considered mainly feast foods. It is thought that the Japanese introduced lime trees to the island, which now bear fruit almost all year round and are considered to be of high quality. A variety of tangerines, which are green when ripe, also abound, and are famous and sought after throughout the surrounding islands. Mountain apples, a tropical tree fruit unrelated to apples (Malus), are grown in many parts of Kosrae as are the delicious strawberry papayas and pineapples. There are many varieties of bananas that are some of the best tasting to be found anywhere, some that must be cooked before eating and others that can be eaten when still greenish (KALIFORNI). A few local farmers are growing and exporting to the Marshall Islands a variety of vegetables such as cucumbers, Chinese cabbage, lettuce, egg plant, squash, cantaloupe and watermelons.

== Land snails of Kosrae ==
There are at least 15 species of land snails reported from Kosrae:

- Assimineidae - Omphalotropis laevis
- Diplommatinidae - Palaina sp.
- Helicinidae - Pleurotoma zonata
- Hydrobiidae - undescribed species
- Pupinidae - Pupina sp.
- Achatinellidae - two undescribed species
- Charopidae - Sinployea kusaieana
- Ellobiidae - Melampus cs. luteus
- Helicarionidae - Kororia palaensis
- Pupillidae - undescribed species
- Rhytididae - Delos oualanensis
- Achatinidae - Subulininae, Allopeas clavulinum, Subulina octona
- Veronicellidae - an unidentified juvenile

== Notable person ==
- Adelyn Noda - Kosrae's youngest ordained deaconess
- Jacob Nena - First elected governor of Kosrae after the ratification of the constitutions of the Federated States of Micronesia and the State of Kosrae that established the two national and state respective governments. Nena became the 3rd Vice President of the Federated States of Micronesia in 1991, and in 1996 assuming the 4th president of the country after the nation's 3rd president, Baily Olter, died in 1996.

== See also ==
- Kosrae crake
- Kosrae starling
- Kosrae flying fox
