= 2019 Micronesian general election =

2019 Micronesian parliamentary election
← 2017	5 March 2019	2021 →

All 14 seats in Congress
- Presidential election
← 2015	11 May 2019	2023 →
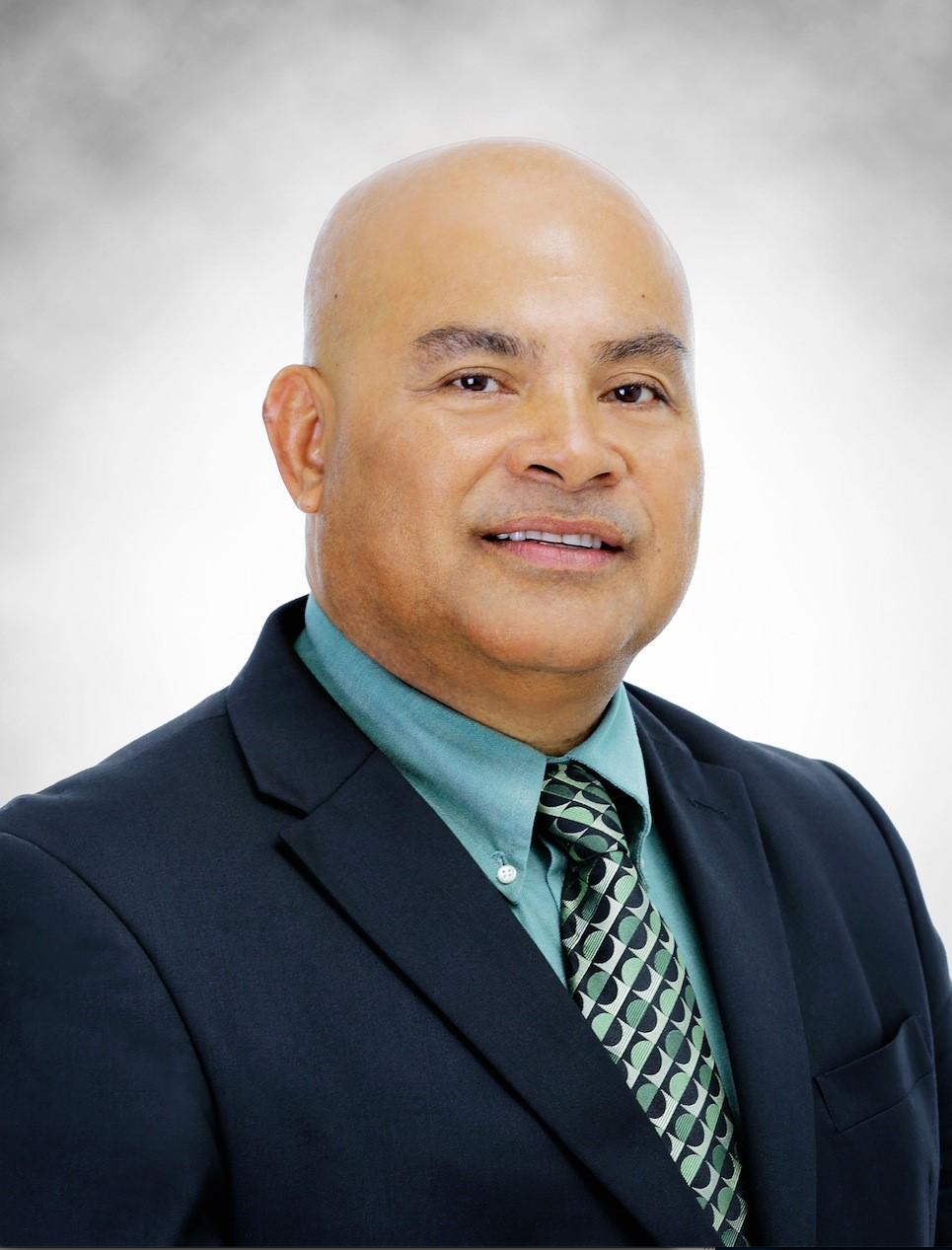
Nominee	David Panuelo
Electoral vote	Acclamation
President before election
Peter M. Christian
Elected
President
David Panuelo

Parliamentary elections were held in the Federated States of Micronesia on 5 March 2019, alongside a referendum on calling a Constitutional Convention. All 14 seats in Congress were up for election, and all 13 incumbents standing for re-election were returned to Congress.

A majority of voters voted in favour of calling a Constitutional Convention, which was subsequently elected on 5 November 2019.

== Electoral system ==
The 14 members of Congress were elected by two methods; ten were elected in single-member constituencies by first-past-the-post voting for two year terms, while four were at-large Senator, with one elected from each state for a four-year term.

Following the elections, the President and Vice-President were elected by the Congress, with only the four at-large Senators allowed to be candidates.

Unlike a constitutional referendum, which requires 75% of the vote in three of the four states to vote in favour in order for the proposal to be approved, referendums on calling constitutional referendums require only a simple majority of the vote.

== Campaign ==
A total of 32 candidates were originally registered to contest the elections, although Chuuk Electoral District 1 candidate Mithasy Mark later dropped out, leaving Florencio Singkoro Harper to run unopposed. Former President Joseph Urusemal was the only candidate for the Senatorial seat in Yap State, whilst Victor Gouland ran unopposed in Electoral District 2 in Chuuk State.

== Referendums ==
A national referendum was held alongside the parliamentary election in which voters were asked whether they were in favor of calling a constitutional convention.

An independence referendum was scheduled to be held in Chuuk State on the same day, but was postponed.

== Results ==
Incumbent president Peter M. Christian was not elected to Congress, making him ineligible for a second term. He lost the Pohnpei At-Large election by 59 votes.

=== Congress ===
State	District	Candidate	Votes	%	Notes
Chuuk	At-Large	Wesley Simina	17,270	83.06	Re-elected
Chuuk	At-Large	Erin Eram	3,523	16.94	
Chuuk	Election District 1	Florencio Singkoro Harper	2,975	100	Re-elected unopposed
Chuuk	Election District 2	Victor Gouland	2,694	100	Re-elected unopposed
Chuuk	Election District 3	Derensio Konman	4,616	67.06	Re-elected
Chuuk	Election District 3	Eflove Mailos	2,267	32.94	
Chuuk	Election District 4	Tiwiter Aritos	5,062	85.03	Re-elected
Chuuk	Election District 4	Manuel Rawit	593	9.96	
Chuuk	Election District 4	Smith Paulus	298	5.01	
Chuuk	Election District 5	Robson Urak Romolow	1,119	39.55	Re-elected
Chuuk	Election District 5	Vidalino Jones Raatior	708	25.03	
Chuuk	Election District 5	Zander Refilong	463	16.37	
Chuuk	Election District 5	Arisao Aichem	353	12.48	
Chuuk	Election District 5	Joseph Konno, Jr.	186	6.57	
Kosrae	At-Large	Yosiwo George	1,824	50.14	Elected
Kosrae	At-Large	Aren Palik	1,814	49.86	
Kosrae	Election District	Paliknoa Welly	2,130	58.82	Re-elected
Kosrae	Election District	Johnson Asher	1,491	41.18	
Pohnpei	At-Large	David Panuelo	6,774	50.22	Re-elected
Pohnpei	At-Large	Peter M. Christian	6,714	49.78	
Pohnpei	Election District 1	Ferny Perman	2,397	52.88	Re-elected
Pohnpei	Election District 1	Merlynn Abello-Alfonso	2,136	47.12	
Pohnpei	Election District 2	Dion Neth	2,077	39.90	Re-elected
Pohnpei	Election District 2	Berney Martin	1,105	21.23	
Pohnpei	Election District 2	Herman Semes, Jr.	1,020	19.60	
Pohnpei	Election District 2	Quincy Lawrence	1,003	19.27	
Pohnpei	Election District 3	Esmond Moses	2,543	68.77	Re-elected
Pohnpei	Election District 3	Marstella Jack	1,155	31.23	
Yap	At-Large	Joseph Urusemal	2,371	100	Re-elected unopposed
Yap	Election District	Isaac Figir	2,225	90.12	Re-elected
Yap	Election District	Fidelik Thiyer-Fanoway	244	9.88	
Source: PIO

=== Referendum ===
The referendum proposal was approved by 61% of voters overall. A majority was in favour in Kosrae and Pohnpei, but it was rejected in Chuuk and Yap. However, as an overall majority of voters approved the proposal, a Constitutional Convention was elected on 5 November 2019.

Choice	Popular vote		State vote
Choice	Votes	%	State vote
For	10,033	60.84	2
Against	6,458	39.16	2
Invalid/blank votes		–	–
Total	16,491	100	4
Registered voters/turnout			–
Source: PIO

==== By state ====
State	For		Against	
State	Votes	%	Votes	%
Chuuk	1,545	44.51	1,926	55.49
Kosrae	1,476	75.46	480	24.54
Pohnpei	5,948	68.07	2,790	31.93
Yap	1,064	45.74	1,262	54.26
Source: Direct Democracy

== Aftermath ==
On 4 July 2019 a special election was held in Pohnpei and Kosrae to fill the at-large seats vacated by President Panuelo and Vice President George, respectively. Peter M. Christian was elected in Pohnpei, while Aren Palik won in Kosrae.
