= 2023 Micronesian general election =

2023 Micronesian parliamentary election
- 7 March 2023

All 14 seats in Congress
- Presidential election
- 11 May 2023
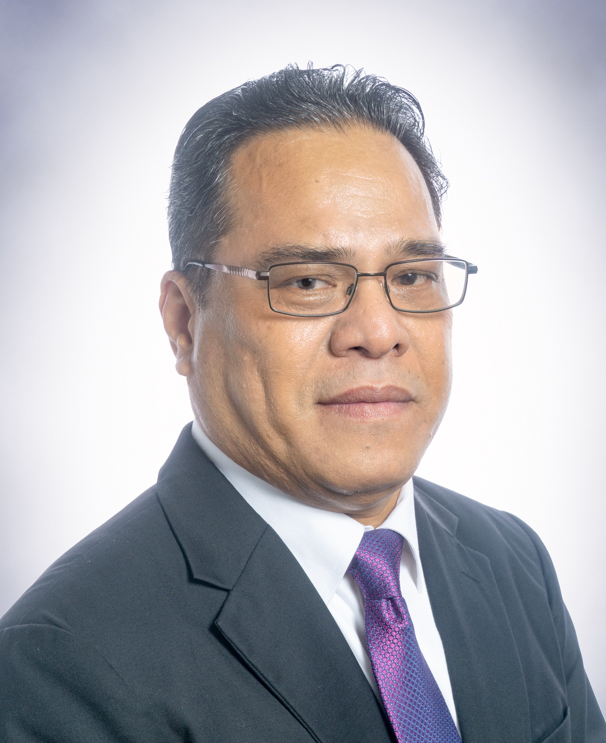
Nominee	Wesley Simina
Electoral vote	Acclamation
President before election
David Panuelo
Elected
President
Wesley Simina

Parliamentary elections were held in the Federated States of Micronesia on 7 March 2023 to elect the fourteen members of the Congress: ten representatives of the districts, and four senators each representing one of the four states.

== Context ==
The elections of 2019 saw the re-election of the thirteen outgoing senators vying for a new term, including three elected unopposed in their constituencies. The then incumbent President, Peter Christian, however, was defeated as Pohnpei State Senator, leading to the indirect election of David Panuelo as president. The 2021 legislative election led to the reappointment of the ten outgoing deputies.

President Panuelo ran for re-election in 2023, but announced that this election would be his last. The Pacific Islands Forum sent an election observer team led by a senior officer from the Republic of Marshall Islands Electoral Administration.

== Electoral system and politics ==
The Federated States of Micronesia is a federal presidential republic. The president is both head of state and government. There are no political parties in the Federated States of Micronesia, so all candidates and elected members are independent.

The Congress has fourteen members. Four of them represent one of the four federated states, and are elected for a four-year term by universal suffrage and by the citizens of their respective states. The remaining ten are elected by citizens by single majority voting for two-year terms, from ten constituencies divided by population: five in the state of Chuuk, one in the state of Kosrae, three in the state of Pohnpei, and one in the state of Yap. After the legislative election, the President and Vice President are indirectly elected by Congress from among the Senators, for a maximum of two consecutive four-year terms. Their positions as Senators are filled by a new election.

== Results ==
State	District	Candidate	Votes	%	Notes
Chuuk	At-Large	Wesley Simina	12,756	63.27	Re-elected
Chuuk	At-Large	Gillian Doone	3,711	18.41	
Chuuk	At-Large	Nakama Sana	3,693	18.32	
Chuuk	Election District 1	Florencio Singkoro Harper	2,940	83.93	Re-elected
Chuuk	Election District 1	Juan Martin	563	16.07	
Chuuk	Election District 2	Victor Gouland	3,262	92.17	Re-elected
Chuuk	Election District 2	Tainiro Killion	277	7.83	
Chuuk	Election District 3	Perpetua S. Konman	3,572	52.13	Re-elected
Chuuk	Election District 3	Myron Hashiguchi	3,280	47.87	
Chuuk	Election District 4	Tiwiter Aritos	3,985	100	Re-elected unopposed
Chuuk	Election District 5	Robson Urak Romolow	1,155	54.87	Re-elected
Chuuk	Election District 5	Zander Refilong	580	27.55	
Chuuk	Election District 5	Ruphin Micky	370	17.58	
Kosrae	At-Large	Aren Palik	1,836	64.08	Re-elected
Kosrae	At-Large	Yoslyn Sigrah	1,029	35.92	
Kosrae	Election District	Paliknoa Welly	2,514	100	Re-elected unopposed
Pohnpei	At-Large	Peter M. Christian	4,467	35.33	Re-elected
Pohnpei	At-Large	William Kostka	3,906	30.89	
Pohnpei	At-Large	Welson Panuel	2,225	17.60	
Pohnpei	At-Large	David Panuelo	2,045	16.17	
Pohnpei	Election District 1	Merlynn Abello-Alfonso	2,128	55.85	Elected
Pohnpei	Election District 1	Ferny Perman	1,682	44.15	Unseated
Pohnpei	Election District 2	Quincy Lawrence	3,057	59.70	Elected
Pohnpei	Election District 2	Dion Neth	2,064	40.30	Unseated
Pohnpei	Election District 3	Esmond Moses	2,159	58.51	Re-elected
Pohnpei	Election District 3	Erick Paul	1,531	41.49	
Yap	At-Large	Joseph Urusemal	2,110	92.63	Re-elected
Yap	At-Large	Fidelik Thiyer-Fanoway	168	7.37	
Yap	Election District	Isaac Figir	2,283	100	Re-elected unopposed
Source: CFSM

== Presidential election ==
On 11 May, the Congress elected Wesley Simina as the new President. Aren Palik was re-elected to the position of the Vice President. Additionally, Esmond Moses was elected Speaker of the Congress.
