= 2023 Micronesian constitutional referendum =

Referendum on proposed amendments to the constitution of Micronesia

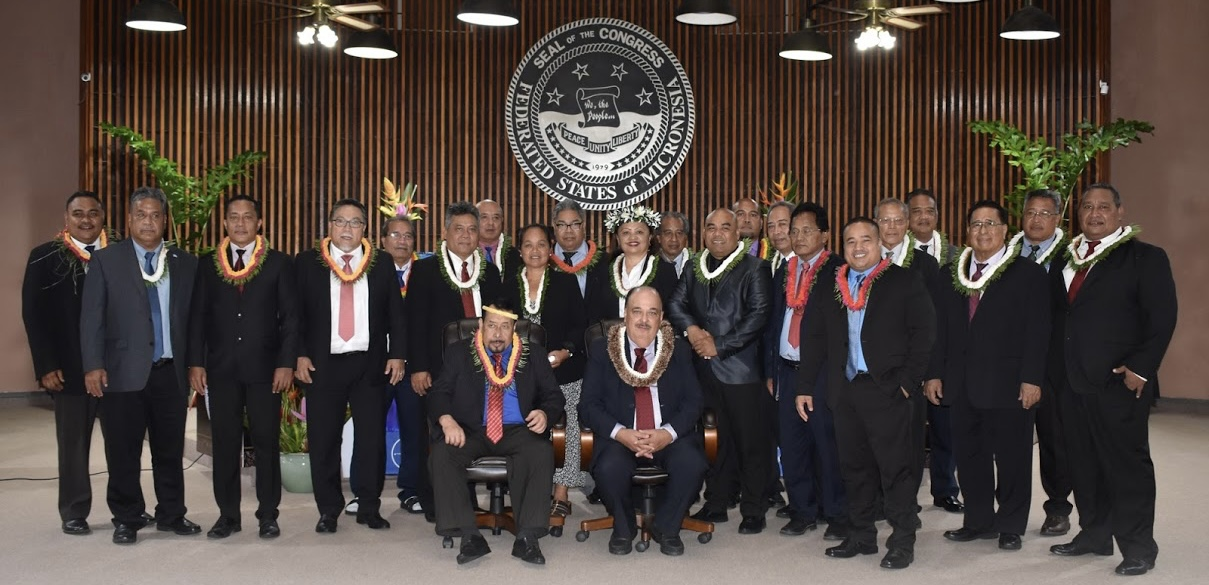
Delegates to the 4th FSM Constitutional Convention

A referendum on nine proposed amendments to the constitution was held in Micronesia on 4 July 2023. Eight of the amendments were proposed by the Constitutional Convention elected in 2019, and one amendment was proposed by Congress. All nine amendments passed, and were officially ratified by President Simina on 4 October 2023.

== Background ==
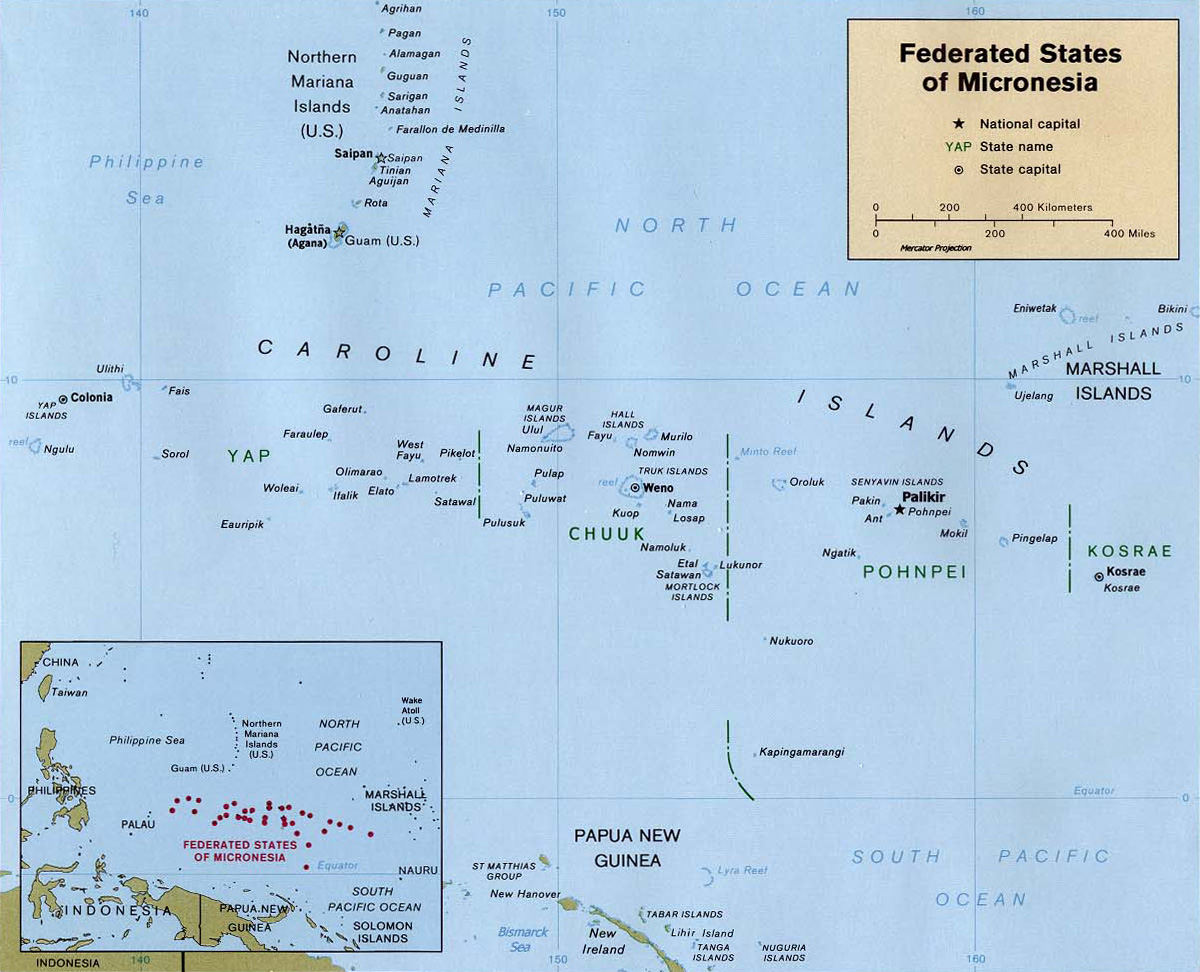
FSM map showing constituent states

The Federated States of Micronesia, abbreviated FSM, is a federal presidential republic consisting of four states, Yap, Chuuk, Pohnpei and Kosrae, spread across the western Pacific.

FSM law requires that a referendum on holding a Constitutional Convention must occur at least once every ten years. In a referendum held alongside parliamentary elections in March 2019, a majority of Micronesian voters voted in favor of holding a Constitutional Convention. Constituent elections were held on 4 November 2019, electing 24 delegates to the Constitutional Convention: 11 from Chuuk State, 7 from Pohnpei State, 3 from Kosrae State, and 3 from Yap State. The Constitutional Convention convened on 7 January 2020, but was interrupted by the COVID-19 pandemic and did not meet between 13 March 2020 and 1 June 2022.

The Constitutional Convention disbanded on 28 June 2022, having proposed 8 constitutional amendments. In November 2022 Congress proposed another amendment, bringing the total number of proposals to be voted on in the subsequent referendum to 9.

== Legal provisions ==
For an amendment to the constitution to go into effect, it must be approved in a referendum by at least three-quarters of the vote in at least three of the four states.

== Proposed changes ==
The nine proposed amendments to the constitution are:

- Changing the constitutional amendment approval threshold from three-quarters of the votes in three-quarters of the states to two-thirds of the votes in three-quarters of the states.
- Allowing dual citizenship for those with at least one parent holding FSM citizenship, restoring citizenship to those who lose their citizenship due to non-renunciation of foreign citizenship under the previous policy, and providing a path to restoration of citizenship to those who renounced their citizenship under the previous policy.
  - Removing the ban on dual citizenship has been a long-standing project of successive Micronesian governments, having failed to pass in previous referendums in 2005, 2007, 2011, and 2017. All previous proposals received majority support from voters, but did not clear the high threshold for constitutional amendments.
  - Dual citizenship is of particular importance to the Micronesian-American community, many of whom reside in the United States due to the Compact of Free Association governing relations between the two nations and have children eligible for U.S. citizenship.
- Providing that revenue derived from fishing license fees also be shared with the states as opposed to being granted solely to the national government.
  - Under the scheme, half of the total annual sum of these revenues would be divided between the states. Of this sum, 30% would be divided between them equally, and the remaining 70% divided in proportion to their population.
- Increasing the number of votes required for Congress to override a presidential veto from three-quarters of state delegations to two-thirds of electoral district representatives and three-quarters of at-large members.
  - Previously, the requirements for overriding a presidential veto were the same as those for passing a law after its second reading. In practice this gave the veto only symbolic power, as it did not make the passage of a law more difficult for Congress. The amendment thus shifts the balance of power in favor of the executive branch.
- Providing that half of the total annual sum of the net revenue derived from seabed mining, if the country were to engage in it, would be divided between the state governments involved.
  - The FSM has not yet allowed seabed mining within its exclusive economic zone, meaning that the proposal would have no effect until such time as the FSM decides to do so. Proposing such an amendment despite the lack of actual seabed mining may be an attempt at establishing a domestic legal framework prior to the adoption of official deep-sea mining regulations by the International Seabed Authority.
- Modifying eligibility requirements to run for Congress.
  - To run for Congress, a person would now need to be a citizen by birth (instead of having been for at least fifteen years), in addition to having had residence in the country as a whole for at least five years prior to running for office (instead of in the state they run), be at least 30 years of age, and be a domiciliary of the state the person is representing (the latter of which has no time requirement, instead of for at least five years previously).
  - Since the President is elected by Congress from its membership, the amendment de facto modifies the eligibility requirements for the presidency.
- Providing an exception to the jurisdiction of the Supreme Court in land cases, stating that state courts have exclusive jurisdiction over cases where an interest of land is at issue.
- Establishing the Office of the Independent Prosecutor, an independent national government agency which would be "tasked with investigating and prosecuting individuals, governments, and entities that receive and misuse public funds from the national government, and to investigate and prosecute certain national government officials for national offenses involving public corruption."
  - The Independent Prosecutor would be appointed by the President for a term of six years (and until a successor is appointed and confirmed), subject to Congressional confirmation via a two-thirds vote.
  - Congress would also be able to impeach the person in the position by the same majority.
- Recognizing "the right to a healthy environment."
  - The sole amendment proposed by Congress rather than the Constitutional Convention.

== Results ==
In mid-July the National Election Office was still awaiting results from Chuuk State. In August, the Yap Election Commissioner was accused of having incorrectly calculated the percentage of votes in favor of the amendment on fishing revenues, using the number of registered voters as the denominator rather than the number of valid ballots cast, resulting in an erroneous rejection of the proposal. Since Pohnpei and Kosrae both approved the amendment, the possibility of an incorrect result from Yap was rendered moot by Chuuk's approval. Initial results also indicated that Pohnpei had rejected the amendment on changing the amending threshold, with only 70.25% voting in favor, but a subsequent publication by the national election office corrected the figures and clarified that the amendment was approved. Official results were announced in mid-September.

Question	Chuuk	Kosrae	Pohnpei	Yap	Outcome
Question	% in favor	% in favor	% in favor	% in favor	Outcome
Dual citizenship	86.71	86.6	87.47	78.63	Approved
Eligibility for Congress	84.71	86.0	86.03	82.58	Approved
Healthy environment	86.58	93.0	58.77	87.97	Approved
Independent Prosecutor	86.14	86.5	80.51	83.44	Approved
Land case jurisdiction	83.04	85.7	86.03	60.53	Approved
Presidential veto	83.39	84.8	87.99	82.64	Approved
Mining revenue distribution	86.39	87.3	87.56	75.08	Approved
Fishing revenue sharing	86.17	87.7	87.77	73.48	Approved
Constitutional amendment threshold	84.47	90.9	84.46	79.61	Approved
Sources: Direct Democracy, Office of the National Election Director

== Aftermath ==
All of the proposals met the required thresholds for validation, with six of the proposals being approved by all states and the remaining three meeting the requirement of approval by three out of four states. The amendments were officially ratified by President Simina on 4 October 2023. Congress subsequently passed enabling legislation for several of the amendments, including revisions to revenue sharing of tax incomes between national and state governments in light of the amendment on fishing license revenue sharing.

The referendum was the first time since 1991 that an amendment was approved by voters. The adoption of the amendment lowering the amending threshold to two-thirds of voters in three-quarters of states will facilitate the approval of future proposals.
