= 2001 Micronesian general election =

2001 Micronesian parliamentary election
← 1999	6 March 2001	2003 →

10 of the 14 seats in Congress

Parliamentary elections were held in the Federated States of Micronesia on 6 March 2001. As there were no political parties, all 18 candidates ran as independents. Four candidates were elected unopposed.

== Electoral system ==
At the time of the election, Congress consisted of 14 members, of which 10 were elected for two-year terms and four elected for four-year terms. The 2001 elections were for the ten two-year seats.

== Results ==
Party	Votes	%	Seats
Independents		100	10
Total		100	10
Source: Adam Carr

=== Elected members ===
State	Seat	Elected member	Notes
Chuuk	District 1	Henry Asugar	
Chuuk	District 2	Roosevelt Kansou	Unopposed
Chuuk	District 3	Jack Fritz	
Chuuk	District 4	John Petewon	
Chuuk	District 5	Simeon Innocenti	Unopposed
Kosrae	–	Claude Phillip	Unopposed
Pohnpei	District 1	Dohsis Halbert	
Pohnpei	District 2	Wagner Lawrence	
Pohnpei	District 3	Peter M. Christian	
Yap	–	Isaac Figir	Unopposed
Source: Adam Carr
