= 2025 Micronesian general election =

- 4 March 2025

10 of the 14 seats in Congress
	Majority party
Party	Independents
Seats won	10
- Popular vote share of elected members by electoral district

Parliamentary elections were held in the Federated States of Micronesia on 4 March 2025 to elect ten of the fourteen seats of the Congress of Micronesia for a two-year term. There are no political parties and all candidates stood as independents.

== Electoral system ==
The 14-member Congress has ten members elected every two years by first-past-the-post voting in single-member constituencies and four senators (representing each of the four states: Yap, Chuuk, Pohnpei, and Kosrae) who are elected every four years.

== Results ==
State	District	Candidate	Votes	%	Notes
Chuuk	Election District 1	Julio M. Marar	2,192	53.26	Re-elected
Chuuk	Election District 1	Alfred Ansin	1,924	46.74	
Chuuk	Election District 2	Victor Gouland	3,238	84.21	Re-elected
Chuuk	Election District 2	Curtis K. Sos	607	15.79	
Chuuk	Election District 3	Perpetua Konman	4,573	100	Re-elected unopposed
Chuuk	Election District 4	Tiwiter Aritos	4,015	100	Re-elected unopposed
Chuuk	Election District 5	Robson U. Romolow	974	100	Re-elected unopposed
Kosrae	Election District 1	Johnson A. Asher	1,292	100	Re-elected unopposed
Pohnpei	Election District 1	Merlynn Abello-Alfonso	1,766	55.46	Re-elected
Pohnpei	Election District 1	Jayson Walter	709	22.27	
Pohnpei	Election District 1	Marcelo K. Peterson	709	22.27	
Pohnpei	Election District 2	Jermy W. Mudong	1,514	37.72	Elected
Pohnpei	Election District 2	Quincy Lawrence	1,436	35.77	Unseated
Pohnpei	Election District 2	Welson Panuel	1,064	26.51	
Pohnpei	Election District 3	Esmond Moses	1,537	100	Re-elected unopposed
Yap	Electoral District 1	Andy Choor	2,438	75.36	Elected
Yap	Electoral District 1	Victor Nabeyan	536	16.57	
Yap	Electoral District 1	Alexander Tretnoff	216	6.68	
Yap	Electoral District 1	Fidelis Thiyer-Fanoway	45	1.39	
Source: FSMEC
