= 2017 Micronesian general election =

← 2015	7 March 2017	2019 →

10 of the 14 seats in Congress

Parliamentary elections were held in the Federated States of Micronesia on 7 March 2017, alongside a referendum on allowing dual citizenship. Although the proposed constitutional amendment to allow dual citizenship was approved by a majority of voters, it did not pass the threshold of 75% voting in favour in at least three of the four states.

== Electoral system ==
The 14 members of Congress are elected by two methods; ten are elected in single-member constituencies by first-past-the-post voting for two year terms. The four at-large Senators are elected on the basis of one from each state, for four year terms

Following the elections, the President and Vice-President are elected by the Congress, with only the four at-large Senators allowed to be candidates.

== Results ==
=== Congress ===
State	District	Candidate	Votes	%	Notes
Chuuk	Election District 1	Florencio Singkoro Harper	2,359	100	Elected unopposed
Chuuk	Election District 2	Victor Gouland	3,793	69.08	Elected
Chuuk	Election District 2	Tesime Kofot	1,698	30.92	
Chuuk	Election District 3	Derensio S. Konman	3,957	60.76	Elected
Chuuk	Election District 3	Bonsiano Fasy Nethon	2,556	39.24	
Chuuk	Election District 4	Tiwiter Aritos	5,110	100	Elected unopposed
Chuuk	Election District 5	Robson Romolow	1,346	51.43	Elected
Chuuk	Election District 5	Williander D. Jack	772	29.50	
Chuuk	Election District 5	Mathias Kuor	499	19.07	
Kosrae	Election District	Paliknoa K. Welly	1,538	97.16	Elected
Kosrae	Election District	Write-in	45	2.84	
Pohnpei	Election District 1	Femy S. Perman	3,156	60.88	Elected
Pohnpei	Election District 1	Merlynn Abello-Alfonso	2,028	39.12	
Pohnpei	Election District 2	Dion G. Neth	1,511	26.05	Elected
Pohnpei	Election District 2	Berney Martin	1,401	24.15	
Pohnpei	Election District 2	Francisco L. Ioanis	1,132	19.51	
Pohnpei	Election District 2	Herman Semes Jr.	865	14.91	
Pohnpei	Election District 2	Nixon B. Soram	535	9.22	
Pohnpei	Election District 2	Naiten O. Phillip	357	6.15	
Pohnpei	Election District 3	Esmond Moses	2,548	76.33	Elected
Pohnpei	Election District 3	Marstella E. Jack	790	23.67	
Yap	Election District	Isaac V. Figir	2,281	83.31	Elected
Yap	Election District	Fidelis Thiyer-Fanoway	457	16.69	
Source: CFSM

=== Referendum ===
The constitutional amendment to allow dual citizenship was passed in all four states, but only by more than 75% of voters in Kosrae.

State	For		Against	
State	Votes	%	Votes	%
Chuuk	12,735	61		39
Kosrae	2,694	85		15
Pohnpei	14,344	70.21		29.79
Yap	1,563	52		48
Total	31,336			
Source: Kaselehile Press, Direct Democracy
