= 2015 Micronesian general election =

2015 Micronesian parliamentary election
- 3 March 2015

All 14 seats in Congress
- Presidential election
- 11 May 2015
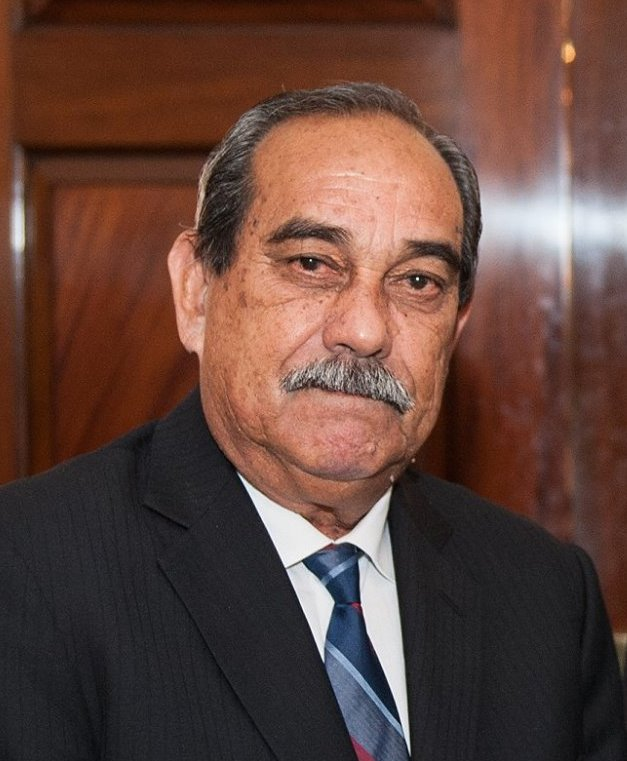

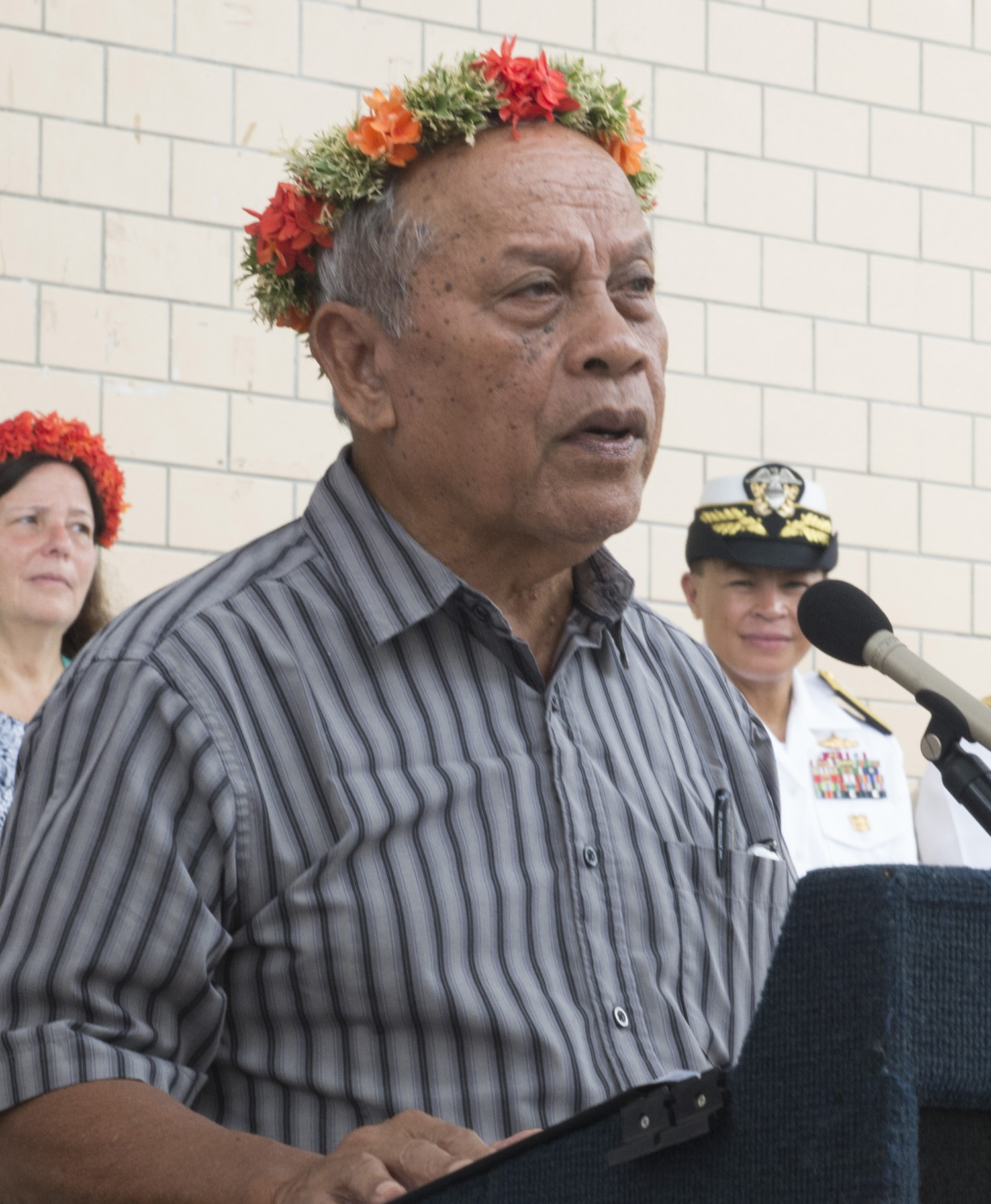
Nominee	Peter M. Christian	Yosiwo George
Electoral vote	12	2
Percentage	85.71%	14.29%
President before election
Manny Mori
Elected President
Peter M. Christian

Parliamentary elections were held in the Federated States of Micronesia on 3 March 2015. A simultaneous independence referendum was also scheduled to be held in Chuuk State, but was postponed shortly before the elections.

== Electoral system ==
The 14 members of Congress were elected in two methods; 10 are elected from single-member constituencies by plurality voting, whilst four senators are elected by the four States. Following the elections, the President and vice-president are elected by Congress from the Senators.

== Campaign ==
A total of 34 candidates registered to contest the 14 seats. In late February the election of the House of Representatives for Chuuk was postponed by State Governor Johnson Elimo, with the Public Affairs Office stating that voting documents were not ready. Elimo also postponed the planned independence referendum.

== Results ==
State	District	Candidate	Votes	%	Notes
Chuuk	At-Large	Wesley Simina	16,702	60.46	Elected
Chuuk	At-Large	Gillian Doone	10,921	39.54	
Chuuk	Election District 1	Florencio Singkoro Harper	3,566	77.17	Elected
Chuuk	Election District 1	Able (Epel) Kristoph	1,055	22.83	
Chuuk	Election District 2	Victor S. Gouland	2,914	56.65	Elected
Chuuk	Election District 2	Roger S. Mori	1,650	32.08	
Chuuk	Election District 2	Chanser H. Yeseki	580	11.28	
Chuuk	Election District 3	Bonsiano F. Nethon	3,479	43.77	Elected
Chuuk	Election District 3	Elvis T. Shirai	2,425	30.51	
Chuuk	Election District 3	Marcellus Akapito	2,045	25.73	
Chuuk	Election District 4	Tiwiter Aritos	4,603	56.07	Elected
Chuuk	Election District 4	Takamichy Y. Mori	2,571	31.32	
Chuuk	Election District 4	Hatnat K. Meneky	1,035	12.61	
Chuuk	Election District 5	Robson U. Romolow	855	30.87	Elected
Chuuk	Election District 5	Ruphin Micky	781	28.19	
Chuuk	Election District 5	Winiplat A. Bisalen	611	22.06	
Chuuk	Election District 5	Season S. Jacky	523	18.88	
Kosrae	At-Large	Yosiwo George	2,385	57.79	Elected
Kosrae	At-Large	Alik L. Alik	1,742	42.21	
Kosrae	Election District	Paliknoa Welly	2,870	69.56	Elected
Kosrae	Election District	Rensile Sigrah	1,256	30.44	
Pohnpei	At-Large	Peter M. Christian	9,091	59.58	Elected
Pohnpei	At-Large	John Ehsa	3,545	23.23	
Pohnpei	At-Large	Dionisio E. Saimon	1,579	10.35	
Pohnpei	At-Large	Dion G. Neth	782	5.12	
Pohnpei	At-Large	Selestino L. Marquez	262	1.72	
Pohnpei	Election District 1	Ferney S. Perman	2,628	53.14	Elected
Pohnpei	Election District 1	Dohsis Halbert	2,317	46.86	
Pohnpei	Election District 2	Berney Martin	3,406	56.46	Elected
Pohnpei	Election District 2	Goodwin Etse	2,627	43.54	
Pohnpei	Election District 3	David Panuelo	4,026	100	Elected unopposed
Yap	At-Large	Joseph Urusemal	2,518	100	Elected unopposed
Yap	Election District	Isaac V. Figir	2,498	100	Elected unopposed
Source: National Election Office
