= 2019 Micronesian Constitutional Convention election =

Election in 2019 to choose delegates to a convention on the constitution of Micronesia

Constitutional Convention elections were held in the Federated States of Micronesia on 5 November 2019. The elections were held following a referendum in March 2019, in which 61% of voters voted in favour of calling a convention.

The Convention had 24 delegates; 11 from Chuuk State, 7 from Pohnpei State and three each from Kosrae State and Yap State.

It led to the 2023 Micronesian constitutional referendum.

== Results ==
State	District	Candidate	Votes	Notes
Chuuk	At-large	Redley Killion	6,149	Elected
Chuuk	Election District 1	Peter Sitan	1,438	Elected
Chuuk	Election District 1	Marcus Samo	936	Elected
Chuuk	Election District 2	Camillo Noket	1,316	Elected
Chuuk	Election District 2	Nickson M. Bossy	1,271	Elected
Chuuk	Election District 3	Myron I. Hashiguchi	2,969	Elected
Chuuk	Election District 3	Jack S. Fritz	2,335	Elected
Chuuk	Election District 4	Cindy Siren Mori	1,706	Elected
Chuuk	Election District 4	Kind K. Kanto	1,130	Elected
Chuuk	Election District 5	James A. Naich	1,085	Elected
Chuuk	Election District 5	Asterio R. Takesy	1,028	Elected
Kosrae	At-large	Johnson A. Asher	1,818	Elected
Kosrae	Electoral District 1	Yoslyn G. Sigrah	1,152	Elected
Kosrae	Electoral District 1	Canney L. Palsis	1,094	Elected
Pohnpei	At-large	Iso Salvador Iriarte	3,160	Elected
Pohnpei	Election District 1	Akilino H. Susaia	1,461	Elected
Pohnpei	Election District 1	Tesiwo Liwy	1,019	Elected
Pohnpei	Election District 2	Salomon Saimon	1,372	Elected
Pohnpei	Election District 2	Berney Martin	1,062	Elected
Pohnpei	Election District 3	Mason Albert	1,611	Elected
Pohnpei	Election District 3	Ricky F. Cantero	1,191	Elected
Yap	At-large	Victor Nabeyan	2,243	Elected
Yap	Electoral District 1	Andrew R. Yatilman	1,200	Elected
Yap	Electoral District 1	Andy P. Choor	968	Elected
Source: Government of Micronesia
