= 2021 Micronesian general election =

- 2 March 2021

10 of the 14 seats in Congress

Parliamentary elections were held in the Federated States of Micronesia on 2 March 2021, to elect ten of the fourteen seats of the Congress of Micronesia for a two-year term. There are no political parties and all candidates stood as independents.

== Electoral system ==
The 14-member Congress has ten members elected every two years by first-past-the-post voting in single-member constituencies and four senators (representing each of the four states, Yap, Chuuk, Pohnpei and Kosrae) who are elected every four years, the last time being in 2019 and the next time in 2023.

== Results ==
State	District	Candidate	Votes	%	Notes
Chuuk	Election District 1	Florencio Singkoro Harper	2,181	100	Re-elected unopposed
Chuuk	Election District 2	Victor Gouland	3,162	74.21	Re-elected
Chuuk	Election District 2	Johnson Elimo	1,099	25.79	
Chuuk	Election District 3	Derensio Konman	4,419	100	Re-elected unopposed
Chuuk	Election District 4	Tiwiter Aritos	4,053	100	Re-elected unopposed
Chuuk	Election District 5	Robson Urak Romolow	1,318	64.93	Re-elected
Chuuk	Election District 5	Ruphin Micky	712	35.07	
Kosrae	Election District	Paliknoa Welly	1,916	58.94	Re-elected
Kosrae	Election District	Johnson Asher	1,335	41.06	
Pohnpei	Election District 1	Ferny Perman	2,244	51.34	Re-elected
Pohnpei	Election District 1	Ausen Lambert	2,127	48.66	
Pohnpei	Election District 2	Dion Neth	1,954	43.55	Re-elected
Pohnpei	Election District 2	Quincy Lawrence	1,601	35.68	
Pohnpei	Election District 2	Berney Martin	932	20.77	
Pohnpei	Election District 3	Esmond Moses	1,697	44.55	Re-elected
Pohnpei	Election District 3	Erik Paul	1,291	33.89	
Pohnpei	Election District 3	Jose Joab	490	12.86	
Pohnpei	Election District 3	Marstella Jack	331	8.69	
Yap	Election District	Isaac Figir	2,314	100	Re-elected unopposed
Source: Office of the National Election Director
