= Governor of Chuuk =

Highest Elected position in the state of Chuuk, Federated States of Micronesia

The office of the Governor of Chuuk is the highest elected position in the state of Chuuk, Federated States of Micronesia. The state was called Truk until 1989, so the title of this office prior to the change was Governor of Truk.

History of the office holders follows

Image	Name	Inaugurated	Left office	Lieutenant Governor
	Erhart Aten	October 1978	May 8, 1986	Hans Wiliander; Bob Mori
	Gideon Doone	May 8, 1986	1990	Bob Mori
	Sasao H. Gouland	1990	June 1996	Marcellino Umwech
	Marcellino Umwech	June 1996	April 1997	?
	Ansito Walter	April 1997	April 19, 2005	Manuel D. Sound
	Wesley Simina	April 19, 2005	July 27, 2011	Johnson Elimo
	Johnson Elimo	July 27, 2011 (acting to Sep 2, 2011)	Apr 2021	Ritis Heldart (2011–January 4, 2014); Marius Akapito (since May 2, 2014)
	Alexander Narruhn	April 13, 2021	Incumbent	Mekeioshy William
