= Michael Dubno =

American inventor

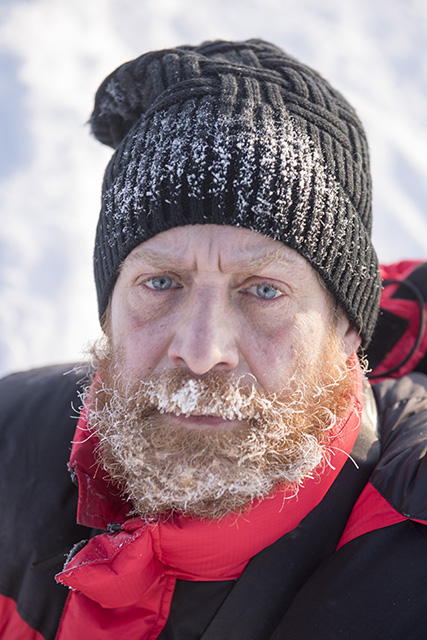
- Born: Brooklyn, NY
- Occupations: Inventor, Computer scientist, Explorer, Video game developer

Michael Dubno is an American inventor, computer scientist, explorer, and video game developer.

== Early life and education ==
Dubno was born on August 23, 1962 in Brooklyn, New York. He is the younger brother of television news producer Daniel Dubno. His family moved to the Bronx where he attended the Bronx High School of Science. In the 1970s, very few high schools and individuals had computers. Bronx Science had an IBM 1620 and an HP 2000E computer but no formal programming classes. Dubno taught himself how to program on the school computers, nearby Lehman College's IBM System/360 (until it was stolen in 1978), and his own North Star Horizon computer.

He attended Rensselaer Polytechnic Institute in 1981 and left in his freshman year.

Dubno founded Megasoft in 1982 and released the video game Megalegs, for Atari computers.

Starting in 1984, he designed and built a robot that talked, moved, had a working arm, navigated using sonar, and had an infrared GPS-like location system.

He maintains a unique workshop in his Manhattan townhouse.

== Wall Street ==
=== Goldman Sachs (1985–2005) ===
Dubno was hired by Fischer Black at Goldman Sachs in 1985 and was referred to as "one of Fischer's grad students". He was the first person hired in the front office specifically for his programming skills. In the firm's Equity division, he developed trading systems and utilities used throughout the firm.

==== SecDB ====
In 1991, he moved from Goldman's J. Aron currency and commodity division. He started SecDB (Securities DataBase) in 1992 to handle storing the rapid growth of new, non-standard, non-listed options in the currencies and metals businesses (interestingly, none of these are "securities", but Dubno, coming from equities, didn't know that at the time). Each new type of option required new and different fields to describe them contractually and mathematically, and unlike SQL, SecDB was object oriented, and designed for the task. SecServ, the underlying home-grown datastore was a cross between an immutable ledger (think blockchain) and an object store for rapid retrieval. SecServ was unique, at the time, because it supported replication around the globe (necessary for currency trading) and each local copy was a "master".

SecDB was then applied to calculating risk on the old and new types of contracts. Kevin Lundeen and Glenn Gribble joined Dubno in 1993/1994 and together they created Slang (Securities LANGuage), an interpreted language to accelerate reporting and adding new objects. Slang is similar to today's Python programming language. As of 2017, Goldman supports from 15 to 40 million lines of Slang.

Over time, SecDB and Slang were deployed in Goldman's other trading businesses (Equities and Fixed Income), becoming the primary risk system for the company. Goldman's operating culture around the application and use of the system helped "Goldman Sachs pioneer the tech-integrated trading business with the first roll-out of SecDB..."

SecDB played an important role in protecting and potentially "saving Goldman Sachs" due to the firm's substantially better risk handling before, and during, the 2008 financial crisis. The Wall Street Journal wrote a brief article describing how SecDB works.

Gary Cohn, former president of Goldman Sachs, referred to SecDB as "such a competitive advantage". The system has also been referred to as "Goldman's most valuable software", Goldman's secret sauce", "most valuable trading weapon", and "unmatched at rivals".

==== Internet ====
Dubno pioneered the use of the Internet and led the creation of the GS Financial Workbench, a firmwide integrated website for institutional clients. The GS Financial Workbench was "one of the first sophisticated financial analysis websites." The site was launched in 1995.

==== CTO & Partner ====
Dubno became a managing director in 1999, a partner in 2001, and was promoted to Chief Technology Officer in 2002. He retired in 2005.

=== Bank of America (2010–2015) ===
Due to the 2008 financial crisis, Bank of America acquired Merrill Lynch in 2009. Neither firm was known for their integrated risk management platforms and to rectify this shortfall, Dubno was hired in 2010 as the CIO of Global Markets Technology at Bank of America. At the bank he finished the integration of Merrill Lynch and Bank of America, and launched Quartz, a system to replicate the success that Goldman Sachs had experienced with SecDB.

In addition to his Global Markets and Investment Research Technology, he ran Global Markets Operations, Firmwide Risk Technology, and co-headed the Global Markets Quantitative Strategies group. Dubno retired from the bank at the end of 2014 after 5 years of service.

== Gadgetoff (2002-current) ==
Along with his brother, Emmy Award-winning news producer and technologist Daniel Dubno, "In 2002, he co-founded Gadgetoff, an organization that brings leading innovators, inventors and entrepreneurs together in an annual event that combines fun with a serious discussion of business and the future."

Gadgetoff's slogan "Bringing the smart and the useless together" attracted presenters and attendees like TED Founder Richard Saul Wurman, Amazon founder Jeff Bezos, Inventor Dean Kamen, AI pioneer Marvin Minsky, DARPA head Tony Tether, iRobot founder Colin Angle, Longevity researcher Aubrey de Grey, Video game designer Will Wright, Architect and toy designer Chuck Hoberman.

Popular Mechanics wrote about the "world's greatest screwball science fair".

== Inventions and art ==
United States Patent US4722053 – (1987) With co-inventor Dan Dubno, "Food service ordering terminal with video game capability". The patent sparked global media interest because the technology was new to the food service industry. The invention predicted the rise of interactive ordering kiosks at airports, on airplanes, and fast food restaurants.

United States Patent US2021/0058369 – (2020) With co-inventors Danny Hillis et al., a method of providing a "Secure Communications System".

Sand table – "The sand table is a functional piece of art. It is a complex electromechanical mechanism within a coffee table that draws patterns in sand. A steel ball bearing sits on top of a pan filled with sand and is moved by a magnet hidden underneath. The magnet is driven along two axes by a gantry controlled by a computer with a web-based interface." (2009)

Tentalux – an interactive animated chandelier with six whirling tentacles of directed light. Each tentacle has a light as a "foot", and is independently controlled. Tentalux has a camera where the "mouth" would normally be, and it uses this to recognize and track objects. The fixture can be controlled through Alexa, Google Home, and a web interface. Positions and animations can be stored and replayed.

Gyre – an animated mobile that uses 3 pairs of umbrellas moving up and down to indicate current and predicted precipitation. The Gyre was originally created for DarkSky, but now resides at Applied Inventions in Cambridge, MA.

== Board membership and government ==
With David Siegel (computer scientist) he co-founded, and co-chairs NYC FIRST. The organization focuses on STEM education and FIRST robotics programs in New York City. NYC FIRST owns and operates two dedicated STEM Centers. The Centers integrate formal, credit-bearing education with informal, unstructured learning, both during the school day and after school, to bring hands-on, sustained STEM education and FIRST robotics programs to schools and communities that do not typically get access to the advanced equipment and expert teaching resources that they need and deserve.

- Executive Advisory Board of FIRST.
- CSforALL Board Member (2016–2022)
- Cerebellum Capital Board Member. (2009–2020)
- Datapipe Independent Board Member. Datapipe was a managed hosting provider which was acquired by Rackspace in 2017.
- Tormach Board member. Tormach is "a provider of compact CNC machines and tooling". (2021–present)
- Acting CTO for Senator Obama's presidential election campaign. (2008)

== Exploration ==
=== North Pole ===
Dubno helped lead the "World's youngest scientific expedition to the North Pole" in 2018. The group carried Explorers Club flag #61. The expedition used Camp Barneo as a base and conducted experiments including:

- Water, snow, and ice sampling to test for microplastics.
- Environmental and location data gathering. The data was given to NASA's Ice Bridge.

=== Masaya Volcano ===
As part of a scientific expedition, Dubno descended to the caldera of the Masaya Volcano in Nicaragua in 2019. He conducted experiments including:

- Thermal mapping drones.
- SO2 sampling drone.
- Extremophile sampling.

=== Challenger Deep, Mariana Trench ===
He is the 18th person to descend to the Challenger Deep, Mariana Trench on March 3, 2021. Pilot Victor Vescovo and Dubno explored the northern wall of the eastern pool. They carried Explorers Club flag #61 on their mission. Together with his "exploration partner", Richard Garriott (17th person to the Deep), the two conducted experiments including:

- Designing and deploying the deepest Geocache in the world
- Gathering water and silt samples to look for piezophiles and microplastics.
- Gathering amphipoda to test for microplastics.
- Hydroforming metal using the intense pressure of the Deep.

== Publications and awards ==
- British Horological Institute: Dubno and co-authors discovered evidence of a Lunar Calendar on the face of the Antikythera mechanism (2020)
- ASME "Mentor Extraordinaire" (2005)

== See also ==
- List of people who descended to Challenger Deep
