= Marcellino Umwech =

Governor of Chuuk, Micronesia, 1996 to 1997

Marcellino D. Umwech was the governor of Chuuk State, Micronesia from June 1996 to April 1997.

On 4 February 1997, he was requested to resign.

Preceded by Sasao Gouland	Governor of Chuuk; 1996–1997	Succeeded by Ansito Walter
