= Alexander Narruhn =

Governor of Chuuk State, Micronesia

Honorable Alexander R. Narruhn
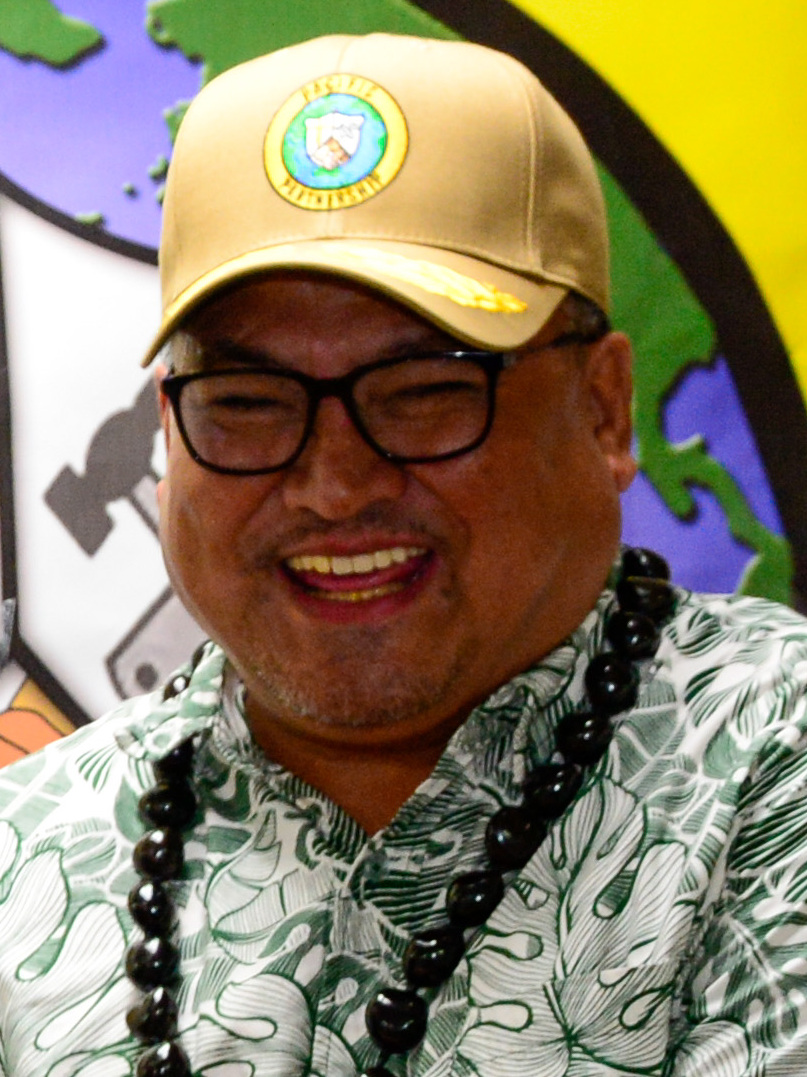
- Narruhn in 2024

Governor of Chuuk
- Incumbent
- Assumed office 13 April 2021
- Lieutenant: Mekeioshy William
- Preceded by: Johnson Elimo

Personal details
- Born: 1966 (age 59–60)

Alexander R. Narruhn (born 1966) is a paralegal and the current governor of Chuuk State, Micronesia, a post he has held since 13 April 2021.

Narruhn graduated from Xavier High School and received a Bachelor of Arts in Business Administration and Master of Arts in Management from National University in San Diego. In 2008, he became the Secretary of the FSM Petroleum Corporation.

In March 2021, he won a gubernatorial election and was sworn in on 13 April. On 19 April, he met with President David Panuelo.

Preceded by Johnson Elimo	Governor of Chuuk; 2021	Succeeded by
