= 1991 Micronesian constitutional referendum =

A 26-part constitutional referendum was held in the Federated States of Micronesia on 2 July 1991. Only four of the proposals to amend the constitution were approved by voters.

== Results ==
#	Proposal	Outcome
1	Four year term of office for Congress members	Rejected
2	List of judges with special responsibilities	Rejected
3	Powers of the Supreme Court	Rejected
4	Constitutional amendments by simple majority in each state	Rejected
5	Clarification of the term of office of the President	Rejected
6	Independent Anti-Corruption Prosecutor	Rejected
7	Co-ordination of government projects with the states	Rejected
8	Individual states ability to impose additional taxes on import duties	Rejected
9	No public funds for Congress members	Rejected
10	Powers for education and social security	Approved
11	Consent of the individual states for a new civil rights law	Rejected
12	Repeal of the ban on indefinite leases of land under certain circumstances	Approved
13	Traditional ownership of land for sub-sea reefs	Rejected
14	Fifty percent of government revenue transferred to the states	Rejected
15	Temporary land rights as collateral for loans	Rejected
16	Exclusive application of Micronesian jurisdiction	Approved
17	Repeal of facilitated repatriation of former residents	Rejected
18	Veto of presidential decisions with a three-quarter majority in Congress	Rejected
19	Restricting Congress to defining only national crime	Approved
20	Powers of individual states on foreign investment	Rejected
21	Inconsistencies of local laws with the Constitution; first congressional elections	Rejected
22	Powers of the President to grant amnesties	Rejected
23	Liability of all official acts of the states	Rejected
24	Access of the public auditor	Rejected
25	Introduction of a chamber of traditional chiefs	Rejected
26	New title for Chapter I	Rejected

== Passed amendments ==
#	Section	Old text	New text
10	Chapter IX article 2 section r	New section	The following powers are expressly delegated to Congress: (r) to promote education and health by setting minimum standards, coordinating state activities relating to foreign assistance, providing training and assistance to the states and providing support for post-secondary educational programs and projects.
10	Chapter IX article 3 section c	The following powers may be exercised concurrently by Congress and the states: (c) to establish systems of social security and public welfare, to promote education and health, and	The following powers may be exercised concurrently by Congress and the states: (c) to establish systems of social security and public welfare.
12	Chapter XIII article 5	An agreement for the use of land for an indefinite term is prohibited. An existing agreement becomes void 5 years after the effective date of this Constitution. Within that time, a new agreement shall be concluded between the parties. When the national government is a party, it shall initiate negotiations.	A lease agreement for the use of land for an indefinite term by a noncitizen, a corporation not wholly owned by citizens, or any government is prohibited.
16	Chapter XI article 11	Court decisions shall be consistent with this Constitution, Micronesian customs and traditions, and the social and geographical configuration of Micronesia.	Court decisions shall be consistent with this Constitution, Micronesian customs and traditions, and the social and geographical configuration of Micronesia. In rendering a decision, the court must consult and apply sources of the Federated States of Micronesia.
19	Chapter IX article 2 section p	The following powers are expressly delegated to Congress: (p) to define major crimes and prescribe penalties, having due regard for local custom and tradition	The following powers are expressly delegated to Congress: (p) to define national crimes and prescribe penalties, having due regard for local custom and tradition
