= Gideon Doone =

Micronesian politician

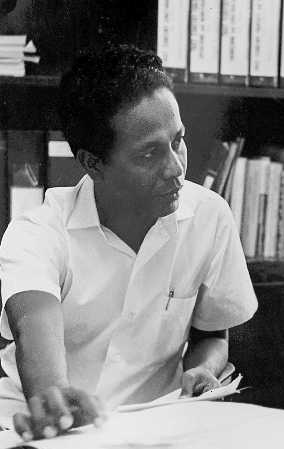
- Doone in 1969

Governor of Chuuk State
- In office May 8, 1986 – 1990
- Lieutenant: Bob Mori
- Preceded by: Erhart Aten
- Succeeded by: Sasao H. Gouland

Gideon Doone is a Micronesian politician who served as the second elected Governor of Chuuk State. Gideon Doone is an alumnus of Xavier High School, a Jesuit secondary school located on Chuuk.
