= Ansito Walter =

Micronesian politician and academic

Governor of Chuuk State
- In office April 1997 – April 19, 2005
- Lieutenant: Manuel D. Sound
- Preceded by: Marcellino Umwech
- Succeeded by: Wesley Simina

Ansito Walter is a politician and academic from the Federated States of Micronesia (FSM).

Walter served as the Governor of Chuuk State for two consecutive terms from April 1997 to April 19, 2005. He was succeeded by Wesley Simina in 2005.

Walter obtained a doctorate in philosophy from the former United States International University, which has since merged to form Alliant International University. He has worked as an academic at several universities throughout the Micronesia region since 1986, within and outside the FSM. In 2006, Walter joined the faculty of the School of Business and Public Administration of the University of Guam, where he has focused on expanding programs and curriculum for students of Chuukese descent.

A founding member of the Center for Micronesian Empowerment, Walter also sits on the board of directors of the Pacific Asia Travel Association and the Guam Charter Schools Policy Board.

In January 2011, newly inaugurated Guam Governor Eddie Calvo appointed Walter to the Guam Education Board. Calvo was forced to withdraw Walter's nomination, however, because he was not a U.S. citizen.
