= Erhart Aten =

Micronesian politician (1932–2004)

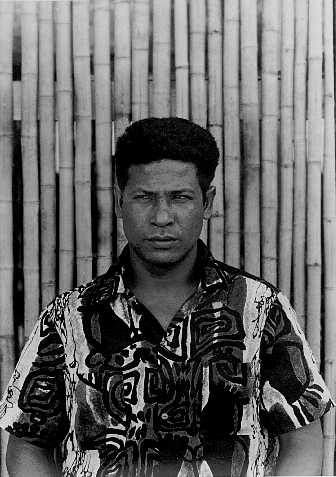
- Aten in 1975

Governor of Chuuk State
- In office October 1978 – May 8, 1986
- Lieutenant: Hans Wiliander; Bob Mori
- Preceded by: office created
- Succeeded by: Gideon Doone

Personal details
- Born: 1932
- Died: 2004 (aged 71–72) Chuuk lagoon, Chuuk, Federated States of Micronesia

Erhart Aten (1932 – November 2004) was a Micronesian politician who served as the first elected Governor of Chuuk State (then called Truk). Aten took office in 1978 after self-government was implemented. He stepped down from office in 1986 after serving two, four-year terms as Governor and was succeeded by Gideon Doone. Aten graduated from Xavier High School, a Jesuit secondary school located on Chuuk, in 1962.

In late November 2004, Aten and three other men were crossing Chuuk lagoon to Weno island when their boat was hit by a storm. Their boat and all on board were lost at sea.

== See also ==
- List of people who disappeared mysteriously at sea
