= Xavier High School, Micronesia =

Roman Catholic school in Chuuk, Micronesia

Xavier High School
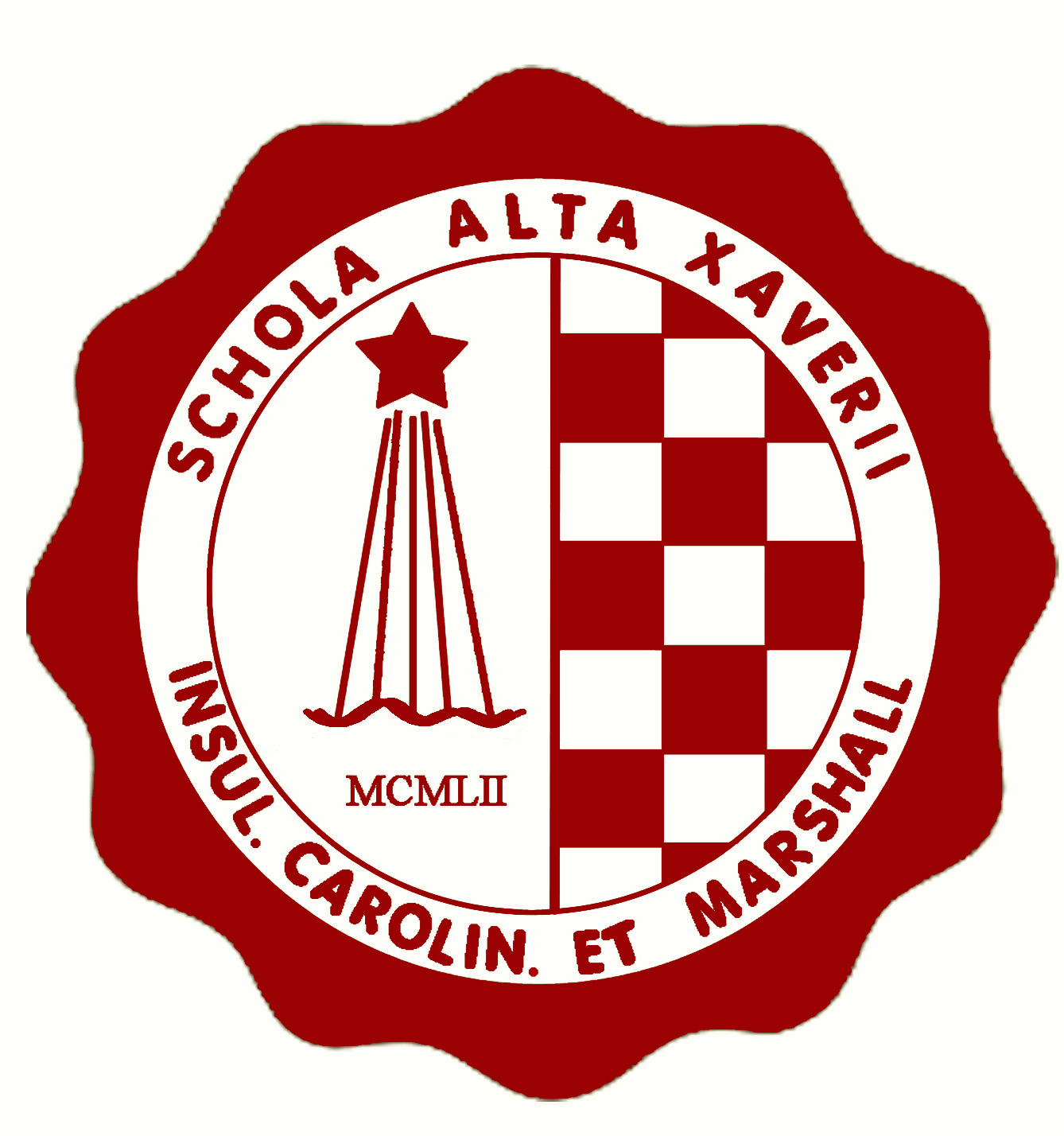

Location
- 1 Xavier Circle; Weno, Chuuk 96942; Federated States of Micronesia; 7°26′50″N 151°53′14″E

Information
- Other name: XHS
- Type: Private college-preparatory school
- Motto: Latin: Ut Omnes Unum Sint (That all may be one)
- Religious affiliation: Roman Catholic
- Established: 1952
- Oversight: Jesuits
- Principal: Martin K. Carl
- Gender: Co-educational
- Color: Red
- Mascot: Navigators
- Website: www.xaviernavigators.org
- St. Xavier Academy
- U.S. National Register of Historic Places
- Location: Winipis, Moen Island, Chuuk, Federated States of Micronesia
- Area: 0.3 acres (1,200 m^{2})
- NRHP reference No.: 76002209
- Added to NRHP: September 30, 1976

Xavier High School (XHS) is a private, Roman Catholic, co-educational college-preparatory school in Weno, Chuuk, Federated States of Micronesia. It was established in 1952 by the Jesuits and run by the US East Province of the Society of Jesus.

It was the first high school in the Trust Territory of the Pacific Islands. Bishop Thomas Feeney, S.J., D.D. from the New York Province of the Society of Jesus (the Jesuits) originally envisioned a minor seminary to train local clergy. Soon after, Xavier Seminary became the first college-preparatory school in the Western Pacific.

Xavier has produced Gates scholars, the first recipient of the Ushiba Scholarship to Sophia University in Japan, and appointments to the U.S. Service Academies.

== History ==
During World War II, the Japanese government urged Mabuchi Construction Company to construct a communications center for the Japanese military in Chuuk. In 1952, Xavier High School was opened at its present site on Mabuchi hill, as the first high school in the Trust Territory of the Pacific Islands. Bishop Thomas Feeney, S.J., D.D. from the New York Province of the Society of Jesus (the Jesuits) originally envisioned a minor seminary to train local clergy. Soon after, Xavier Seminary became the first college-preparatory school in the Western Pacific. The school property was added to the United States National Register of Historic Places in 1976 as St. Xavier Academy.

== Academics ==
Xavier follows closely the academic program at Jesuit college-preparatory schools in the United States: four years of religion, English, literature, science, and mathematics (concluding with calculus), three years of history, and two years of foreign language (Japanese / Spanish), plus computer skills, study skills, and health and wholeness.

Religion courses are very traditional: in the first year, mainly the creeds, sacraments, virtues, Ten Commandments, and Our Father are studied; in the second year, the New Testament and who Jesus is for them are contextualized, following the Ignatian dynamic; in the third year, the Old Testament and Catholic liturgy are studied; and in the fourth year, major moral issues are discussed with the Catechism of the Catholic Church as a guide.

The active service component is during vacation between the junior and senior years when each student devotes 160 hours to some project in direct service to the poor on their home island, keeps a journal, and at the end, enters a common reflection on their experiences. Added to this is the Senior Survey Project, a semester course during which students learn research skills specific to their island nations, linking them again to their communities. Components specific to Micronesia also enter into the syllabus in the first year, covering Pacific history and geography while focusing on relationships among the various Micronesian cultures. Also, senior English classes discuss human rights and social justice issues.

Environmental studies are included in the biology course and offered as an elective in senior year, along with another elective on developmental studies specific to their places of origin. The other electives are Japanese in junior year and accounting and music in senior year.

College and career prep are covered in third and fourth-year English with preparation for the PSAT, SAT, and TOEFL tests, and also in college counseling courses in junior and senior years.

== Staffing and enrollment ==
Xavier High School employs an international staff of Jesuits and volunteers, alumni and local people. Xavier had in 2014 an enrollment of 190 students (107 boys, 83 girls), While most of the boys board on campus, the girls live off campus and are served by school buses. Students come from the different island nations of Micronesia, serving the island-nations of the Federated States of Micronesia, the Republic of Palau, and the Republic of the Marshall Islands. They are selected by passing a written test and written recommendation. Alumni have gone on to influential roles throughout Micronesia. Some have described it as "the Harvard of Micronesia".

== Notable alumni ==
- Isidoro Rudimch, entrepreneur, politician, president of the Senate of Palau
- Erhart Aten, politician
- John Ehsa, politician
- Manny Mori, politician and 7th President of the Federated States of Micronesia
- Peter Sugiyama, politician
- David Kabua, politician and 9th President of the Marshall Islands
- Joseph Urusemal, politician and 6th President of the Federated States of Micronesia
- Peter M. Christian, politician and 8th President of the Federated States of Micronesia
- Alexander Narruhn, paralegal and politician
- Nicole Yamase, marine biologist
- Oldiais Ngiraikelau, jurist
