= 2003 Micronesian general election =

2003 Micronesian parliamentary election
- 4 March 2003

All 14 seats in Congress
President before election
Leo Falcam
Elected President
Joseph Urusemal

Parliamentary elections were held in the Federated States of Micronesia on 4 March 2003. As there were no political parties, all 28 candidates ran as independents. Four candidates were elected unopposed.

== Electoral system ==
At the time of the election, Congress consisted of 14 members, of which 10 were elected for two-year terms and four elected for four-year terms. The 2003 elections were for both types of seats.

== Results ==
State	District	Candidate	Votes	%	Notes
Chuuk	At-Large	Redley A. Killion	14,515	52.27	Elected
Chuuk	At-Large	Jack Fritz	13,252	47.73	
Chuuk	Election District 1	Henry Asugar	1,919	33.71	Elected
Chuuk	Election District 1	Fabian Nimea	1,557	27.35	
Chuuk	Election District 1	Kachuo Eko	1,345	23.63	
Chuuk	Election District 1	Herner Braiei	872	15.32	
Chuuk	Election District 2	Roosevelt Kansou	—		Elected unopposed
Chuuk	Election District 3	Sabino Asor	2,144	30.16	Elected
Chuuk	Election District 3	Wiseman Moses	1,234	17.36	
Chuuk	Election District 3	Joseph Kasian	947	13.32	
Chuuk	Election District 3	Rockhudson Tomy	946	13.31	
Chuuk	Election District 3	Simiram Sipenuk	717	10.09	
Chuuk	Election District 3	Sanphy William	653	9.19	
Chuuk	Election District 3	Johannes Serious	467	6.57	
Chuuk	Election District 4	Twitier Aritos	4,100	55.77	Elected
Chuuk	Election District 4	John Petewon	3,252	44.23	
Chuuk	Election District 5	Nelson Moses	1,279	51.68	Elected
Chuuk	Election District 5	Write-in	1,196	48.32	
Kosrae	At-Large	Alik Alik	1,932	51.77	Elected
Kosrae	At-Large	Jocob Nena	1,800	48.23	
Kosrae	Election District	Claude Phillip	—		Elected unopposed
Pohnpei	At-Large	Resio Moses	5,399	40.02	Elected
Pohnpei	At-Large	Mohner Esiel	4,137	30.66	
Pohnpei	At-Large	Leo A. Falcam	3,955	29.32	
Pohnpei	Election District 1	Dohsis S. Halbert	—		Elected unopposed
Pohnpei	Election District 2	Dion G. Neth	2,299	40.63	Elected
Pohnpei	Election District 2	Wagner M. Lawrence	1,820	32.16	
Pohnpei	Election District 2	Herman Semes	1,540	27.21	
Pohnpei	Election District 3	Peter M. Christian	2,861	67.13	Elected
Pohnpei	Election District 3	Pauli Rodriguez	1,401	32.87	
Yap	At-Large	Joseph Urusemal	2,579	73.90	Elected
Yap	At-Large	Jesse Raglmar-Subolmar	911	26.10	
Yap	Election District	Isaac V. Figir	—		Elected unopposed
Source: Adam Carr
