= Nicole Yamase =

Micronesian marine biologist

- Born: Pohnpei
- Alma mater: Chaminade University of Honolulu; University of Hawaiʻi at Mānoa
- Occupation: Marine biologist

Nicole Hokulani Yamase (born c. 1992) is a Micronesian marine biologist. She is the first person from Micronesia to earn a doctorate in marine biology. On March 11, 2021, she became the 20th person to descend to Challenger Deep in the Mariana Trench, the deepest known point in the Earth's seabed. Though the Challenger Deep is in Micronesia, she is the first Micronesian and first Pacific Islander to make the descent, as well as the fourth woman and the second-youngest person.

Nicole Yamase was born in Pohnpei, Micronesia. She attended Xavier High School in Tol, Chuuk. While at the Chaminade University of Honolulu, she studied ornamental fish in Hawaii, especially the yellow tang, and tink frogs in Costa Rica. She graduated with B.A. in Biology and a B.S. in Environmental Studies. She went on to her Ph.D. in Marine Biology at the University of Hawaiʻi at Mānoa in 2022. Her dissertation was Studying the Ecophysiological Responses of Native Hawaiian Macroalgae in a Changing World.

She made her 10-hour trip to and from the Challenger Deep with pilot Victor Vescovo aboard the DSV Limiting Factor, launching from the DSSV Pressure Drop.
