= List of people who descended to Challenger Deep =

List of people who descended to Earth's deepest point

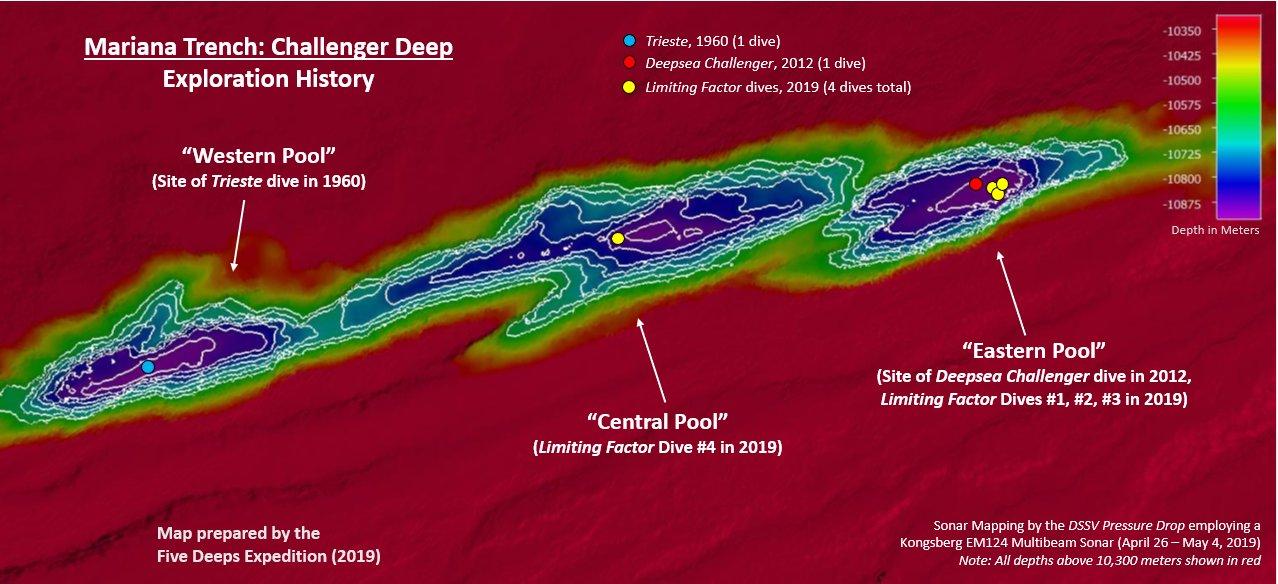
Sonar mapping of the Challenger Deep by the DSSV Pressure Drop employing a Kongsberg SIMRAD EM124 multibeam echosounder system (26 April–4 May 2019)

Challenger Deep (CD) is the deepest known point in the Earth's seabed hydrosphere, a slot-shaped valley in the floor of Mariana Trench, with depths exceeding 10,900 meters. It is located in the Federated States of Micronesia. In 2019, sonar mapping of Challenger Deep by the DSSV Pressure Drop, which employed a Kongsberg SIMRAD EM124 multi beam echosounder system, showed the bottom of Challenger Deep comprised three 'pools' – Western, Central and Eastern.

In 1960, Don Walsh and Jacques Piccard were the first humans to reach Challenger Deep, completing that dive as a team. 52 years later, James Cameron became the first person to solo dive that point. Piccard, Walsh and Cameron remained the only people to reach the Challenger Deep until 2019, when regular dives in DSV Limiting Factor began. To date, 19 of the 22 successful descents have been made in the Limiting Factor. No other craft has made a repeat descent.

Astronaut Kathryn D. Sullivan and mountaineer Vanessa O'Brien were the first two women to visit Challenger Deep in 2020. Victor Vescovo has made the most dives to Challenger Deep; by August 2022 he had made eleven dives to the Eastern pool, two to the Western pool, and two to the Central pool for a total of 15 dives.

The following is a list of individuals who have descended to Challenger Deep in the Federated States of Micronesia. These individuals will have descended at least 10,900 m (35,761 ft) into one of the three pools (western, central or eastern) that constitute Challenger Deep.

No.	Date	Name	Submersible	Location	Notes
1	January 23, 1960	Don Walsh; Jacques Piccard	Trieste	Western Pool	World first; depth record
2	March 25, 2012	James Cameron	Deepsea Challenger	Eastern Pool	First solo
3	April 28, 2019	Victor Vescovo	Limiting Factor	Eastern Pool	Depth record; two solo dives. First person to reach Earth's highest and lowest points.
4	May 1, 2019	Patrick Lahey; Jonathan Struwe	Limiting Factor	Eastern Pool	Deepest marine recovery
5	May 5, 2019	John Ramsay	Limiting Factor	Central Pool	Limiting Factor's designer. Pilot: Lahey
6	June 7, 2020	Kathryn D. Sullivan	Limiting Factor	Eastern Pool	First woman and first astronaut, first person to travel both to Challenger Deep and into space. Pilot: Vescovo
7	June 12, 2020	Vanessa O'Brien	Limiting Factor	Eastern Pool	First woman to Earth's highest and lowest points. Pilot: Vescovo
8	June 14, 2020	John Rost	Limiting Factor	Eastern Pool	Longest time at bottom: 4.2 hours. Pilot: Vescovo
9	June 20, 2020	Kelly Walsh	Limiting Factor	Western Pool	Son of Don Walsh. First father and son. Pilot: Vescovo
10	June 22, 2020	Ying-Tsong Lin	Limiting Factor	Central Pool	First Asian person. Pilot: Vescovo
11	June 26, 2020	Jim Wigginton	Limiting Factor	Eastern Pool	Oldest person. Pilot: Vescovo
12	November 10, 2020	Zhang Wei (张伟); Zhao Yang (赵洋); Wang Zhiqiang (王治强)	Striver	Eastern Pool	First PRC citizens. Pilot: Zhang Wei
13	March 1, 2021	Richard Garriott	Limiting Factor	Eastern Pool	First to both poles, space and Challenger Deep. First male astronaut to Challenger Deep. Pilot: Vescovo
14	March 3, 2021	Michael Dubno	Limiting Factor	Eastern Pool	First Jewish person Pilot: Vescovo
15	March 5, 2021	Hamish Harding	Limiting Factor	Eastern Pool	Records for longest time at bottom (4.25 hours) and longest traverse at bottom (4.6 km). First crew to go to space and Challenger Deep together. Pilot: Vescovo
16	March 11, 2021	Nicole Yamase	Limiting Factor	Western Pool	First Pacific Islander. Pilot: Vescovo
17	April 8, 2021	Rob McCallum; Tim Macdonald	Limiting Factor	Western Pool	First New Zealander and first Australian. Pilot: Macdonald
18	April 15, 2021	Larry Connor	Limiting Factor		Pilot: Patrick Lahey
19	July 3, 2022	Aaron Charles Newman	Limiting Factor	Central Pool	Pilot: Vescovo
20	July 5, 2022	Jim Kitchen	Limiting Factor	Eastern Pool	Pilot: Tim Macdonald
21	July 7, 2022	Dylan Taylor	Limiting Factor	Eastern Pool	Pilot: Vescovo
22	July 12, 2022	Dawn Wright	Limiting Factor	Western Pool	First Black person. Pilot: Vescovo
