= Sasao Gouland =

Micronesian politician (1933–2011)

Honorable Sasao Gouland

Governor of Chuuk
- In office 1990 – June 1996
- Preceded by: Gideon Doone
- Succeeded by: Marcellino Umwech

Personal details
- Born: 2 June 1933
- Died: 6 March 2011 (aged 77)

Sasao H. Gouland (2 June 1933 – 6 March 2011) was the governor of Chuuk State, Micronesia from 1990 to June 1996.

== Biography ==
Sasao Gouland was born in Weno (then called "Moen"), Chuuk on 2 June 1933. He attended primary school in Chuuk state and completed his secondary education at Pacific Islands Central School in Pohnpei State. He continued his education at Fiji School of Medicine and returned to Chuuk State to work as a dental practitioner and then as the Director of Dental Services before beginning his political career in 1968. He served as a member of Congress from 1967 to 1978, during the Government of the Trust Territory of the Pacific Islands. He served as Special Advisor to the Governor of Chuuk on Health Services from April 1985 until May 1986. He was elected governor in 1990 and retired in 1996.

Following his retirement, he continued to serve on various boards and councils including as chairman of the Board of the Micronesian Maritime Authority, and the Board of the Truk Trading Company. In November 2005, he was appointed to the Board of Directors of the FSM Telecommunications Corporation serving as vice-chairman from December 2008 to December 2009. He was reappointed to the FSM Telecommunications Board in 2010 until his death in 2011.

Preceded by Gideon Doone	Governor of Chuuk; 1990–1996	Succeeded by Marcellino Umwech
