= Perpetua Sappa Konman =

Politician from the Federated States of Micronesia

Senator of Congress
- Incumbent
- Assumed office 2021
- Constituency: Chuuk Election District 3

Personal details
- Born: 29 September 1972 (age 54)

Perpetua Sappa Konman (born 29 September 1972) is a Micronesian physician and politician. In 2021 she became the first woman elected to Congress.

== Biography ==
Born in 1972 and from Fefan island in Chuuk State, Konman became a physician. She married Derensio S. Konman, a politician and member of Congress, and had six children.

Following her husband's death in 2021, she contested the subsequent special election for Chuuk Election District 3 (a Senate seat). Receiving 2,532 votes, she defeated Myron I. Hashiguchi (1,962 votes) and Inson I. Namper (1,292) votes, becoming the first woman elected to Congress. She was sworn into office on 13 December. Konman was re-elected in the 2023 parliamentary elections with 52% of the vote.
