= Yoslyn Sigrah =

Yoslyn G. Sigrah
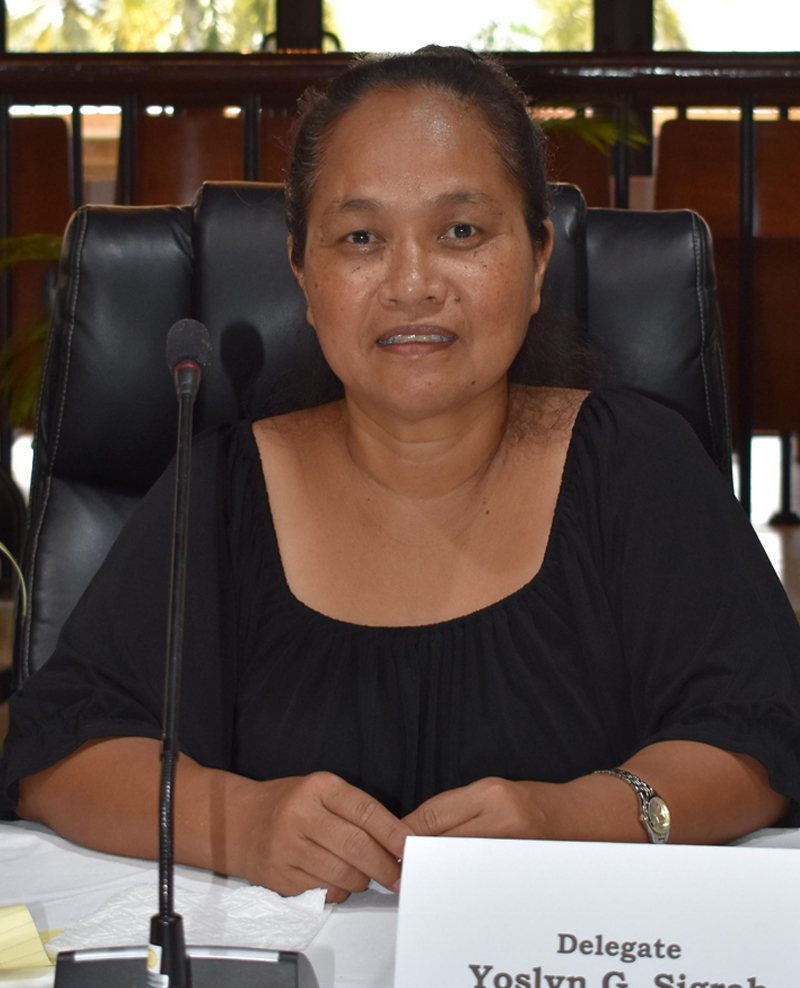
- Sigrah in 2020

Yoslyn G. Sigrah is a lawyer and women's rights activist in the Federated States of Micronesia.

Sigrah is from Kosrae State. She has a law degree from the William S. Richardson School of Law at the University of Hawaiʻi at Mānoa in 2007 and has worked at a law firm in Honolulu. In 2012 she attended a fellowship program in the United States, organized by ABA Rule of Law Initiative, to develop skills to advocate for women, particularly those who have experienced violence.

Sigrah has campaigned for representation of women in politics, in government and parliament, and supported the creation of a Ministry of Women the Federated States of Micronesia. She is active in campaigning for the end of violence against women and girls, including being instrumental in the passing of the 2014 Family Protection Act in Kosrae, a law that criminalizes domestic violence. As an Attorney Advisor she has also represented the Kosrae Women Association.

She spoke at the 66th session of the Convention on the Elimination of all Forms of Discrimination Against Women (CEDAW) in Geneva, 2017, on the state of Micronesian women.

In 2014 she was awarded a Presidential Outstanding Citizens Award by President Emanuel Mori.

Sigrah was elected as a delegate to the 2019 Micronesian Constitutional Convention from Kosrae.
