= Yosiwo George =

Micronesian politician (1941–2022)

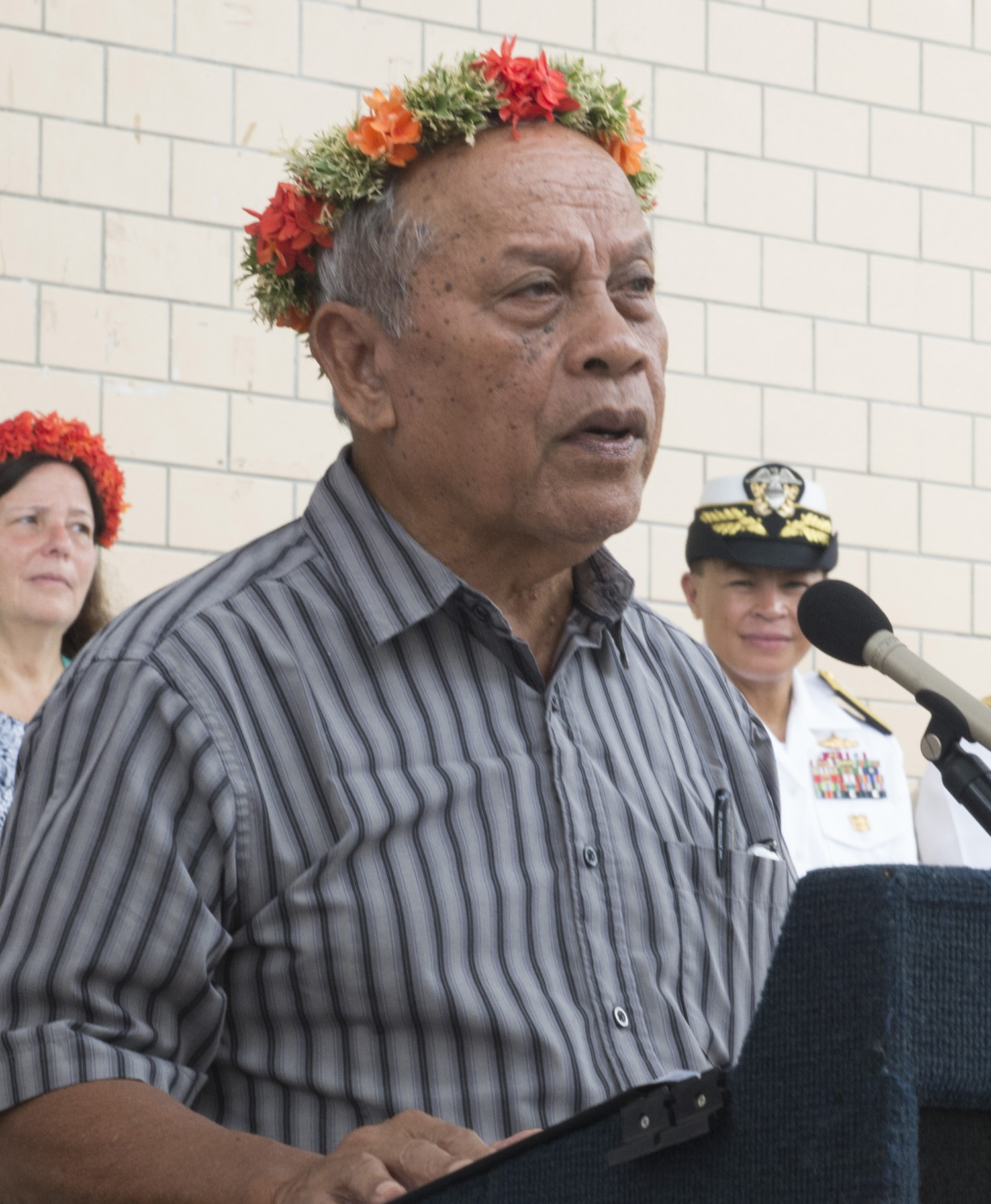
- George in 2015

8th Vice President of the Federated States of Micronesia
- In office 11 May 2015 – 13 August 2022
- President: Peter M. Christian (2015–2019); David W. Panuelo (2019–2022)
- Preceded by: Alik Alik
- Succeeded by: Aren Palik

Personal details
- Born: Yosiwo Palikkun George; 24 July 1941 Kosrae, South Seas Mandate, Empire of Japan
- Died: 13 August 2022 (aged 81) Federated States of Micronesia
- Cause of death: COVID-19
- Party: Independent
- Spouse: Antilise W. Mackwelung
- Children: 7
- Education: University of Hawaii at Manoa; University of New Mexico (BS)

Yosiwo Palikkun George (24 July 1941 – 13 August 2022) was a Micronesian politician.

He served as the Vice President of the Federated States of Micronesia in the 19th (2015–2019) and 20th (2019–2022) terms of congress, under the presidencies of Peter M. Christian and David W. Panuelo.

== Biography ==
George was born in Kosrae. He studied in the Universities of Guam and Hawaii and graduated in 1969. He served as Lieutenant Governor of Kosrae from 1979 to 1980, and then director of the Department of Social Services which oversaw the education, health and social services systems of Micronesia. George served as Governor of Kosrae from January 1983 to January 1991, and later as ambassador to the United States, to Israel and to the United Nations. In 1997 George was elected to Congress of the Federated States of Micronesia where he served until 2001. He was then appointed as chief justice for the Kosrae State Supreme Court until 2006. In May 2015 George was again elected to the Congress of the Federated States of Micronesia, and also as Vice President of the Federated States of Micronesia.

George was married to Antilise W. Mackwelung George, with whom he had seven children. He died from complications of COVID-19 in August 2022, at the age of 81.
