= Jack Fritz (politician) =

Micronesian politician (born 1950)

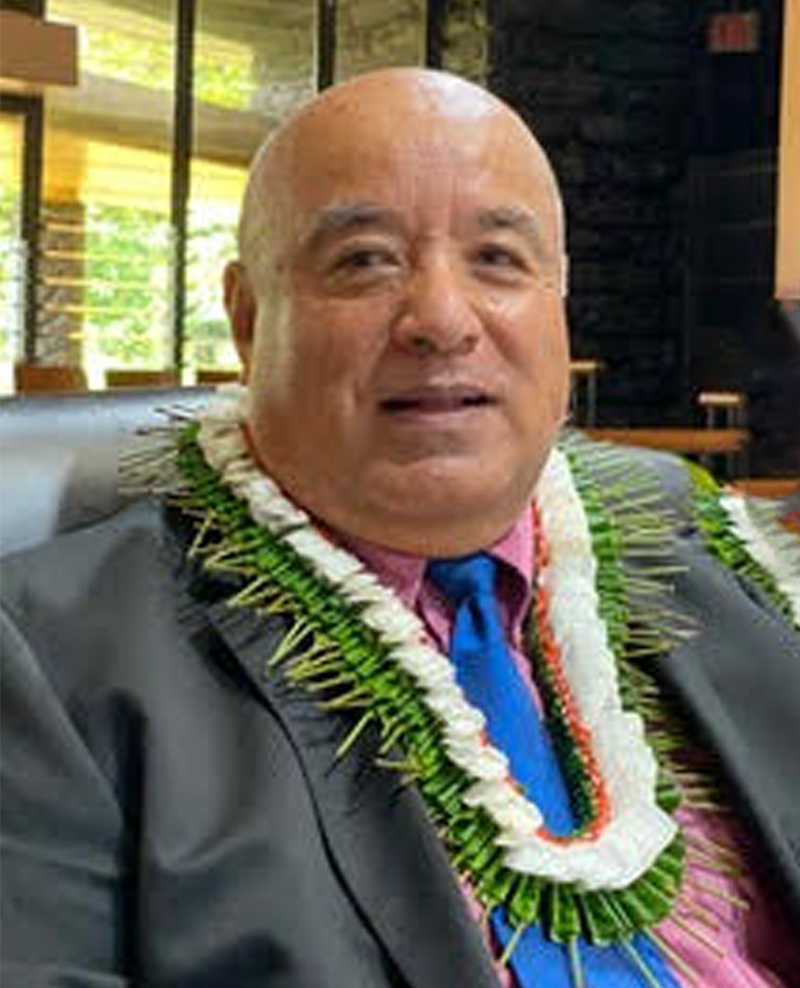
- Fritz in 2020

Speaker of the Congress of the Federated States of Micronesia
- In office May 1987 – May 2003
- Preceded by: Bethwel Henry
- Succeeded by: Peter M. Christian

Personal details
- Born: March 23, 1950 (age 76) Kuttu Islands, Mortlocks
- Spouse: Francy Bossy
- Education: University of Hawaii

Jack S. Fritz (born March 23, 1950) is a Micronesian politician from Chuuk State. He served as the Speaker of the Congress of the Federated States of Micronesia from 1987 to 2003.

Fritz was born March 23, 1950. He received a bachelor's degree in political in 1974 and a juris doctor in 1979 from the University of Hawaiʻi. He was an interpreter at the 1975 Constitutional Convention and worked as legislative counsel in Chuuk. In the 1981 general election, Fritz was elected to the Congress of the Federated States of Micronesia after defeating incumbent Senator Julio Akapito. He represented Chuuk's third district, which was located in the Southern Namoneas. In the third and fourth FSM Congresses, he chaired the Judiciary and Governmental Operations Committee. He also served as Vice Chairman of the status Commission on the FSM Commission on Future Political Status and Transition. In the 5th FSM Congress, Fritz was elected as Speaker.

He served in that position until he lost his seat in the 2003 elections.
