= Tormach =

American machine tool builder

- Company type: Private
- Industry: CNC Machine Tools, Manufacturing
- Founded: 2001; 25 years ago
- Headquarters: Madison, Wisconsin, U.S.
- Area served: USA
- Products: CNC vertical machining centers; CNC lathes/turning centers; Gantry routers
- Website: www.tormach.com

Tormach is an American machine tool builder headquartered in Madison, Wisconsin. The company designs and manufactures lower cost machine tools mostly aimed at the hobbyist, educational and small manufacturing markets. The company's main products include computer numerically controlled (CNC) equipment, such as cnc milling machines, cnc lathes as well as support and software such as LinuxCNC based Pathpilot used to run its CNC machines.

== History ==
Tormach was founded in 2001 by Greg Jackson and Ed Korn in Madison, Wisconsin. The company's first product was a compact and inexpensive CNC machine called the PCNC 1100 mill which launched in 2003. In 2011 the company had released the PCNC 770 a smaller 3 axis mill aimed at home shops or small manufacturers. Aside from mills, Tormach also released different lathe models over the years including the 8L in 2020. The latest product launched by the company is the 1500MX mill which was released in 2024. Though the 1500MX is noted as being more powerful than the other machines Tormach offers.

== Audience ==
Tormach is well known in Hackerspaces, schools, and with hobbyist owners as an entry level machine tool maker. They have made CNC-based tooling more accessible.
