= Ritis Heldart =

Micronesian politician (1953–2014)

Ritis K. Heldart (October 8, 1953 – January 4, 2014) was the Lieutenant Governor of Chuuk State, one of the Federated States of Micronesia, from 2011 until his death in office in January 2014.

Heldart was born to the paramount chief Kolid Heldart, and Elina Toses Alanso of Nama, Mortlock Islands on October 8, 1953. He was married to Linda Nakao Sonis, and they had six children.
