= Aren Palik =

Micronesian politician

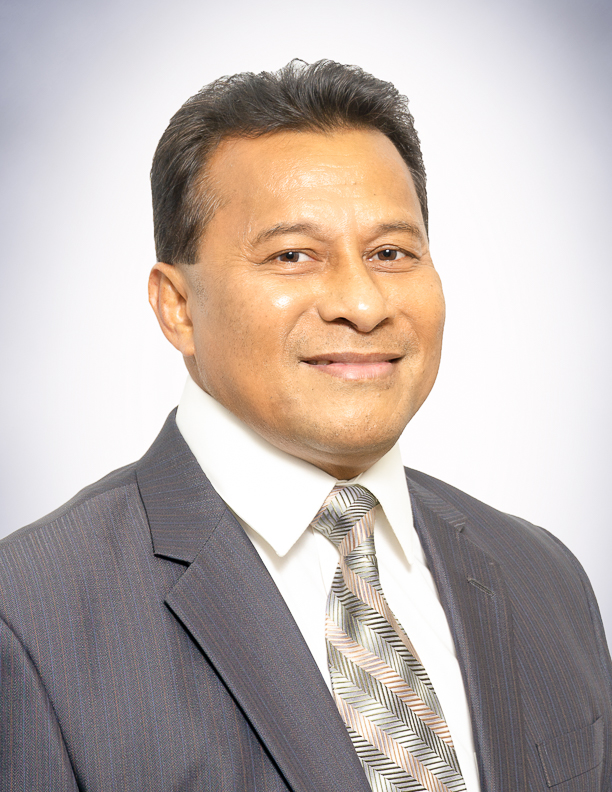
- Palik in 2019

9th Vice President of the Federated States of Micronesia
- Incumbent
- Assumed office 13 September 2022
- President: David Panuelo (2022–2023); Wesley Simina (2023–present)
- Preceded by: Yosiwo George

Personal details
- Born: Aren B. Palik
- Spouse: Adelita Abraham Palik
- Education: Eastern Oregon State College

Aren B. Palik is a Micronesian politician. He has been Vice President of the Federated States of Micronesia from September 2022.

Palik graduated from Eastern Oregon State College in 1982. He has worked in the financial sector in Micronesia. He was the CEO of Pacific Islands Development Bank at the time when he was elected to the Congress of the Federated States of Micronesia in 2019. In the Congress he represented the State of Kosrae.
