= Merlynn Abello-Alfonso =

Politician from the Federated States of Micronesia

Senator of Congress
- Incumbent
- Assumed office May 11, 2023
- Constituency: Pohnpei Election District 1

Personal details
- Born: August 3, 1965 (age 61)

Merlynn Abello-Alfonso (born August 3, 1965) is a Micronesian politician. As of May 2023, she is one of two women who sits in the Congress of Micronesia.

== Biography ==
Abello-Alfonso was born on August 3, 1965. Hailing from Kolonia, Pohnpei State, she graduated from West Visayas State University as a medical student. She is married to Herminio Alfonso and they have three children.

In the 2019 election, Abello-Alfonso ran for Ponhpei Election District 1 against incumbent Ferny Perman but she lost, with Perman and Abello-Alfonso receiving 2,396 and 2,136 votes respectively. She contested the same district in the 2023 election. Receiving 2,128 votes, she defeated Perman who had received 1,682 votes.
