= Wesley Simina =

President of the Federated States of Micronesia since 2023

His Excellency Wesley Simina
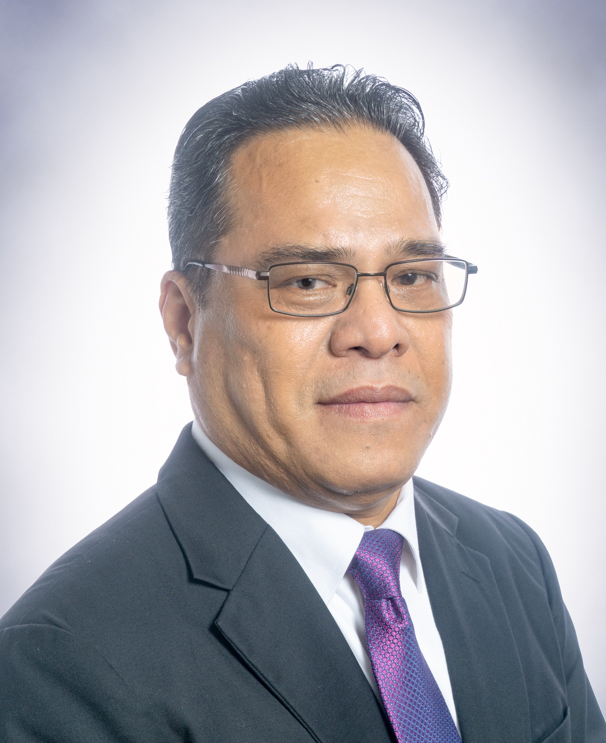
- Official portrait, 2019

10th President of the Federated States of Micronesia
- Incumbent
- Assumed office May 11, 2023
- Vice President: Aren Palik
- Preceded by: David Panuelo

6th Speaker of the Congress of the Federated States of Micronesia
- In office May 11, 2015 – May 11, 2023
- Preceded by: Dohsis Halbert
- Succeeded by: Esmond Moses

Governor of Chuuk
- In office July 1, 2005 – July 27, 2011
- Lieutenant: Johnson Elimo
- Preceded by: Ansito Walter
- Succeeded by: Johnson Elimo

Personal details
- Born: September 10, 1961 (age 65)
- Spouse: Ancelly
- Children: 8
- Education: United States International University (BA); William S. Richardson School of Law (Juris Doctor)
- Simina's voice Simina speaking at Our Ocean Conference 2024; Recorded April 16, 2024

Wesley Simina (born September 10, 1961) is a Micronesian politician who has been the 10th President of the Federated States of Micronesia since 2023. Prior to his presidency he was Speaker of the Congress of the Federated States of Micronesia from 2015 to 2023, a member of Congress from 2011 to 2023, and Governor of Chuuk from 2005 to 2011. He was a lawyer active in Chuuk prior to his political career.

== Early life and education ==
Wesley W. Simina was born on September 10, 1961. He graduated from Chuuk High School. He attended the Jacksonville State University before transferring to the San Diego campus of the United States International University, where he graduated with a Bachelor of Arts degree in 1982. He enrolled at the William S. Richardson School of Law in 1986, and graduated with a Juris Doctor in 1988.

== Career ==
Simina returned to Chuuk after graduating from college and worked for the Chuuk Public Defender's Office as an intern for four years. From 1988 to 1991, he was Directing Attorney for the Public Defender Office in Kosrae and Chuuk. He became a legislative counsel for the Chuuk State Legislature in 1991. He served as Attorney General for Chuuk from 1993 to 1997, and worked as a private practice lawyer for seven years after leaving office. Simina was elected as Chuuk's at-large representative to the 3rd constitutional convention in 2001.

Simina was elected as Governor of the Chuuk State in 2005. Simina defeated Gillian N. Doone, the son of Gideon Doone, in the 2009 election after it went to a runoff election. Johnson Elimo won the 2011 special election to succeed Simina after he was elected to the Congress of the Federated States of Micronesia.

Simina was elected to the congress in a 2011 by-election. He was reelected in the 2015 elections. On May 11, 2015, he was elected as the 6th Speaker of the congress. During his tenure in congress he was a member of the Education, External Affairs, and Transportation and Communications committee. He was the chair of the Judiciary and Governmental Operations committee.

Congress elected Simina as President of the Federated States of Micronesia on 11 May 2023.

== Personal life ==
Simina married Ancelly, with whom he had eight children.

== Works cited ==
=== News ===
- "Chuuk swears in governor, lt. governor, legislators". Marianas Variety. July 10, 2009. Archived from the original on July 14, 2011.
- "Chuuk to hold gubernatorial runoff". Marianas Variety. April 6, 2009. Archived from the original on July 14, 2011.

=== Web ===
- "Speaker Wesley W. Simina". Congress of the Federated States of Micronesia. Archived from the original on January 11, 2019.
- "Tenth President of the Federated States of Micronesia". President of the Federated States of Micronesia. Archived from the original on July 12, 2025.
