= Peter M. Christian =

Micronesian politician (born 1947)

His Excellency Peter M. Christian
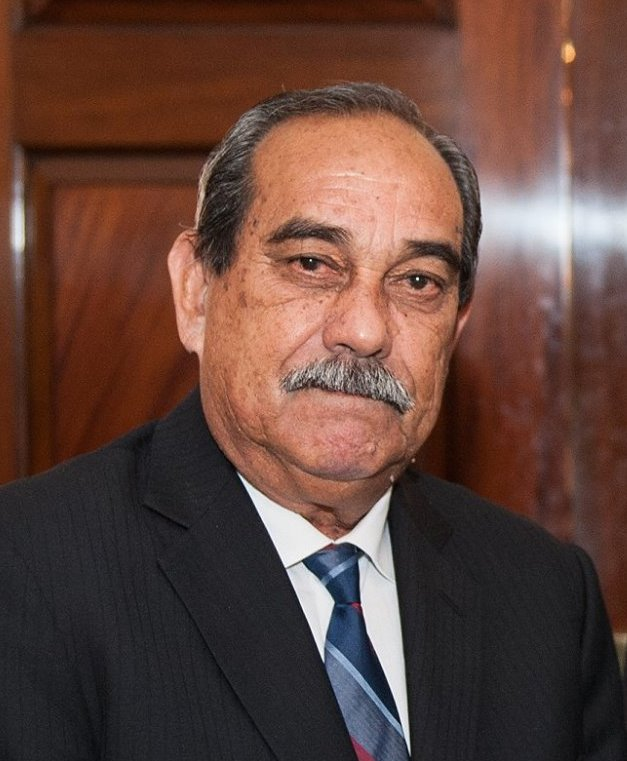
- Christian in 2016

8th President of the Federated States of Micronesia
- In office 11 May 2015 – 11 May 2019
- Vice President: Yosiwo George
- Preceded by: Manny Mori
- Succeeded by: David W. Panuelo

Speaker of the Congress of the Federated States of Micronesia
- In office 12 May 2003 – 11 May 2007
- Preceded by: Jack Fritz
- Succeeded by: Isaac Figir

Personal details
- Born: Peter Martin Christian Souissa; 16 October 1947 (age 78) Pohnpei, Trust Territory of the Pacific Islands (now Micronesia)
- Party: Independent
- Spouse: Maurina Weilbacher
- Education: University of Hawaii

Peter Martin Christian Souissa (born 16 October 1947) is a Micronesian politician who served as the 8th President of the Federated States of Micronesia, from 11 May 2015 to 11 May 2019.

== Early life ==
Peter Martin Christian was born October 16, 1947 in Pohnpei. He attended Xavier High School, the University of Hawaiʻi and took courses at the Honolulu Business College.

== Political career ==
He was a member of the Pohnpei State Legislature. He was among the first fourteen persons to be elected to the first Congress in 1979. He served as the Speaker of the Congress of the Federated States of Micronesia from May 2003 to May 2007. He was elected as a senator in 2007 representing Pohnpei at-large and re-elected in 2011. He served as the Chairman of the Committee on Transportation and Communication during his 2007 term in Congress.

In March 2019, Christian lost the election to become the at-large senator for Pohnpei. Under Micronesian law, the president is chosen from among the four at-large members. As a result, Christian effectively lost his bid for re-election to the presidency. Some sources attributed the loss to a scandal surrounding the indictment in Hawaii of Christian's son-in-law, Master Halbert, an official in the FSM's Department of Transportation, Communication and Infrastructure, for receiving bribes.

Christian has Moluccan blood ties. He is the third generation of a family from Haria, Maluku in Indonesia.

== See also ==
- Politics of Micronesia
- Congress of Micronesia

Political offices
Preceded by Manny Mori	President of Micronesia; 2015–2019	Succeeded by David W. Panuelo
Preceded by Jack Fritz	Speaker of the Congress of Micronesia; 2003–2007	Succeeded by Isaac V. Figir
