= Esmond Moses =

Micronesian politician (born 1974)

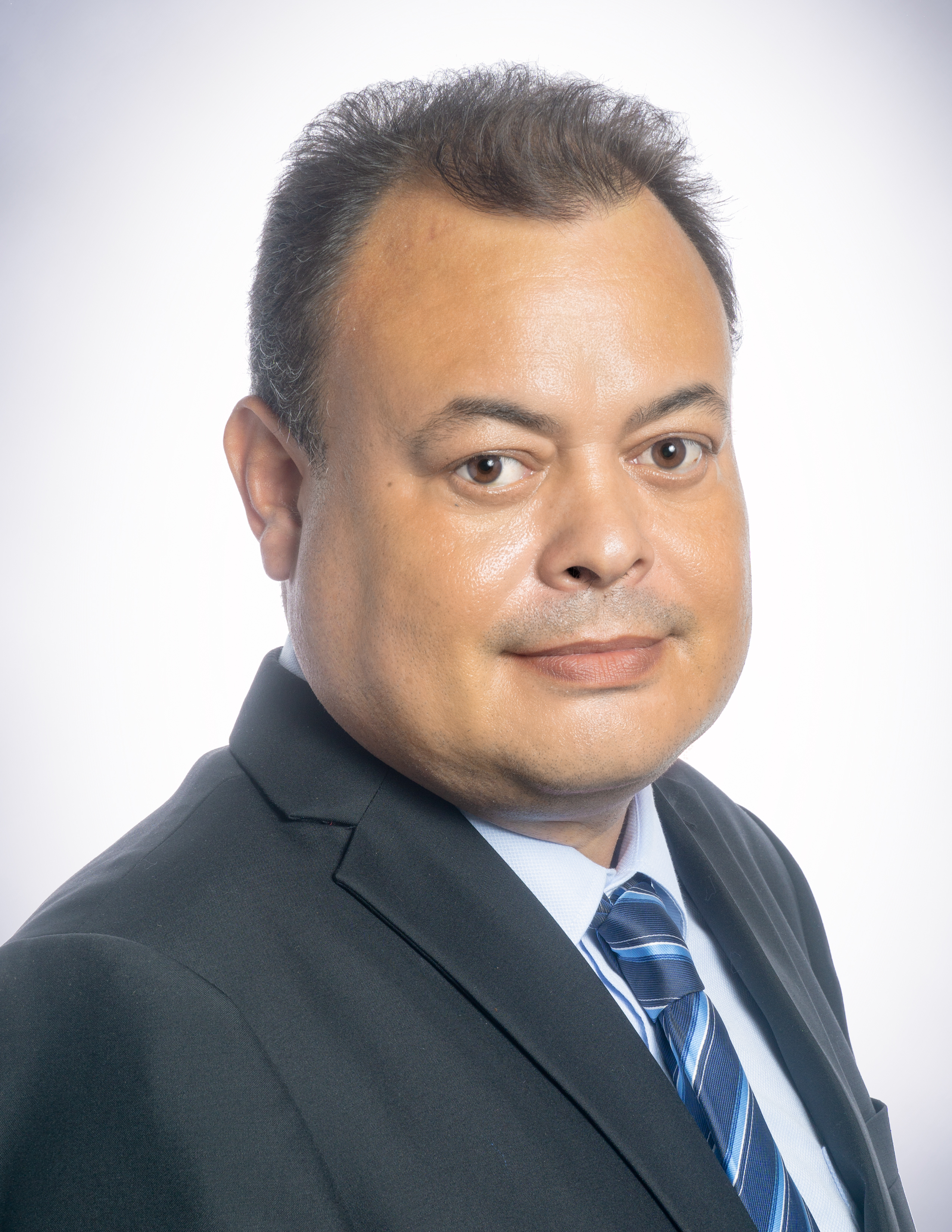
- Official portrait, 2019

Speaker of the Congress of the Federated States of Micronesia
- Incumbent
- Assumed office 11 May 2023
- President: Wesley Simina
- Vice-Speaker: Robson Romolow
- Preceded by: Wesley Simina

Personal details
- Born: Esmond Burdett Moses; April 22, 1974 (age 51)

Esmond Burdett Moses (born April 22, 1974) is a Micronesian politician from Pohnpei State. Since 2023, he has served as the Speaker of the Congress of the Federated States of Micronesia. He previously served as Vice Speaker of the Congress from 2019 to 2023.

== Political career ==
Moses first ran for Congress in 2009 in a special election but lost. He was first elected to the Congress of Micronesia in 2015, representing Pohnpei Election District 3. He was elected Vice Speaker of the Congress in 2019. In the 2023 election held on March 7, Moses was elected to Congress for the fifth time and on May 11, he was elected Speaker of the Congress.
