= Congress of the Federated States of Micronesia =

National legislature of the Federated States of Micronesia

- 23rd Congress
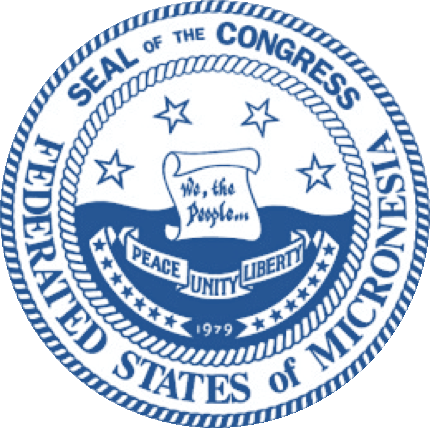

Type
- Type: Unicameral

History
- Founded: 1979

Leadership
- Speaker: Esmond Moses, Ind. since 11 May 2023
- Vice-Speaker: Robson Romolow, Ind.

Structure
- Seats: 14 senators
- Political groups: Independents (14)
- Length of term: 2 years (10 single seat constituencies) 4 years (4 state at-large seats)

Elections
- Voting system: First-past-the-post
- Last election: 4 March 2025
- Next election: 2 March 2027

Meeting place
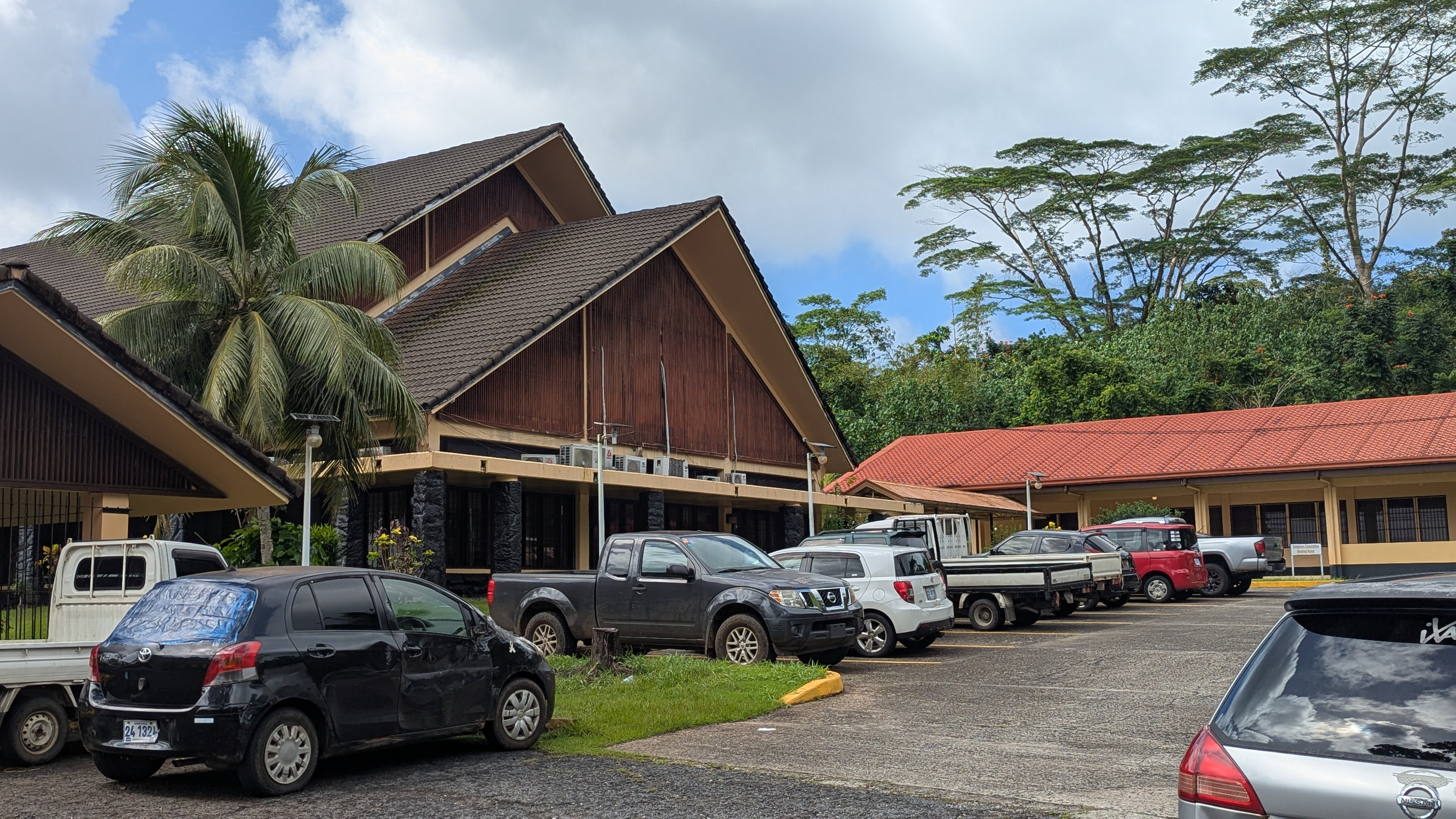
- Government Buildings, Palikir

Website
- www.cfsm.gov.fm

The Congress of the Federated States of Micronesia (FSM) is the unicameral legislative body of the country. It is composed of 14 senators. Elections are held in odd-number years on the first Tuesday following the first Monday in March and are decided by first-past-the-post voting.

== Composition ==
One member is elected at-large for a four-year term from each of the four states (Chuuk, Kosrae, Pohnpei and Yap). The remaining ten members are elected for a two-year term from single-seat constituencies, apportioned by population; for the 23rd Congress, that worked out to five for Chuuk, three for Pohnpei, and one each for Kosrae and Yap. They then elect the Speaker of the Congress for a two-year term.

Up to and including the May 2021 election, no woman had ever been elected to the Congress. However, in a November 2021 by-election, Perpetua S. Konman won the vacated seat of her late husband, becoming the first woman senator. Two other women were elected in the March 2023 election and reelected in 2025. Since Konman's term does not end in 2025, that means that there are three woman senators.

Each member is an independent, as there are no political parties.

== Qualifications ==
To become a member of the FSM Congress, either one elected on the basis of state equality (senator at-large) or one elected based on population, an individual must fulfil these following requirements according to Article 9 of the Constitution.

- Must be at least 30 years of age upon the day of election.
- Must be a resident of the state from which he or she is elected for at least 5 years.
- Must be a citizen of the FSM for at least 15 years.
- Must not be convicted of felony.

== Speakers of the Congress ==
Image	Name	Took office	Left office	Notes
	Bethwel Henry	10 May 1979	May 1987	
	Jack Fritz	May 1987	May 2003	
	Peter M. Christian	12 May 2003	11 May 2007	
	Isaac V. Figir	11 May 2007	11 May 2013	
	Dohsis Halbert	11 May 2013	11 May 2015	
	Wesley Simina	11 May 2015	11 May 2023	
	Esmond Moses	11 May 2023	Incumbent; reelected in 2025	

== Members ==
Ten members were selected in the 2025 Micronesian general election (at-large senators were not up for election).

State	District	Member	Places represented	Notes
Chuuk
Chuuk	Senator (at-large)	Wesley W. Simina	Chuuk	
Chuuk	One	Julio M. Marar	Mortlock Islands	Re-elected
Chuuk	Two	Victor (Vicky) Gouland	Northern Namoneas	Re-elected
Chuuk	Three	Perpetua S. Konman	Southern Namoneas	Re-elected unopposed
Chuuk	Four	Tiwiter Aritos	Faichuuk Region	Re-elected unopposed
Chuuk	Five	Robson U. Romolow	Halls and Northwestern Islands	Re-elected unopposed
Kosrae
Kosrae	Senator (at-large)	Aren Palik	Kosrae	
Kosrae	One	Johnson A. Asher	Kosrae	Re-elected unopposed
Pohnpei
Pohnpei	Senator (at-large)	Peter M. Christian	Pohnpei	
Pohnpei	One	Merlynn Abello-Alfonso	Sokehs, Kolonia, Sapwuahfik, Nukuoro and Kapingamarangi	Re-elected unopposed
Pohnpei	Two	Jermy W. Mudong	Madolenihmw and Kitti	Defeated incumbent
Pohnpei	Three	Esmond B. Moses	U, Nett, Mwoakilloa and Pingelap	Re-elected unopposed
Yap
Yap	Senator (at-large)	Joseph J. Urusemal	Yap	
Yap	One	Andy Choor	Yap	New senator

== See also ==
- Politics of the Federated States of Micronesia
- Congress of the Trust Territory of the Pacific Islands
- List of legislatures by country
