= Masao Nakayama =

Micronesian politician

Federated States of Micronesia Ambassador to Japan
- In office 1989–1997
- President: John Haglelgam; Bailey Olter; Jacob Nena
- Preceded by: Post established
- Succeeded by: Alik Alik

Personal details
- Born: 1941 Chuuk, South Seas Mandate
- Died: November 13, 2011 (aged 70) Nevada, United States

Masao Nakayama (中山 利生, Nakayama Masao; 1941 – November 13, 2011) was a politician and diplomat of the Federated States of Micronesia (FSM).

Born in Chuuk to a Japanese father and a native mother from Onoun, Nakayama was the younger brother of FSM's first president, Tosiwo Nakayama. In 1968, Nakayama was elected a member of the Truk District Legislature. In 1969, he was elected to the Congress of the Trust Territory of the Pacific Islands. After Micronesian independence, Nakayama was the Chief of International Affairs in the Foreign Affairs Department of the FSM from 1980 to 1989.

From 1989 to 1997, Nakayama was the ambassador of FSM to Japan. At the same time, he was concurrently the non-resident ambassador of FSM to China, Indonesia, Malaysia, South Korea and Singapore. In 1998, Nakayama was appointed the Permanent Representative of FSM to the United Nations in New York City.

Nakayama was married to Serlyn Nakayama, with seven children.

He died at the age of 70 in a Nevada hospital days after a stroke.
