= List of ambassadors of the Federated States of Micronesia to the United States =

Coordinates: 38.907829°N 77.038946°W

Ambassador of Federated States of Micronesia to the United States Embassy of the Federated States of Micronesia in Washington, D.C.
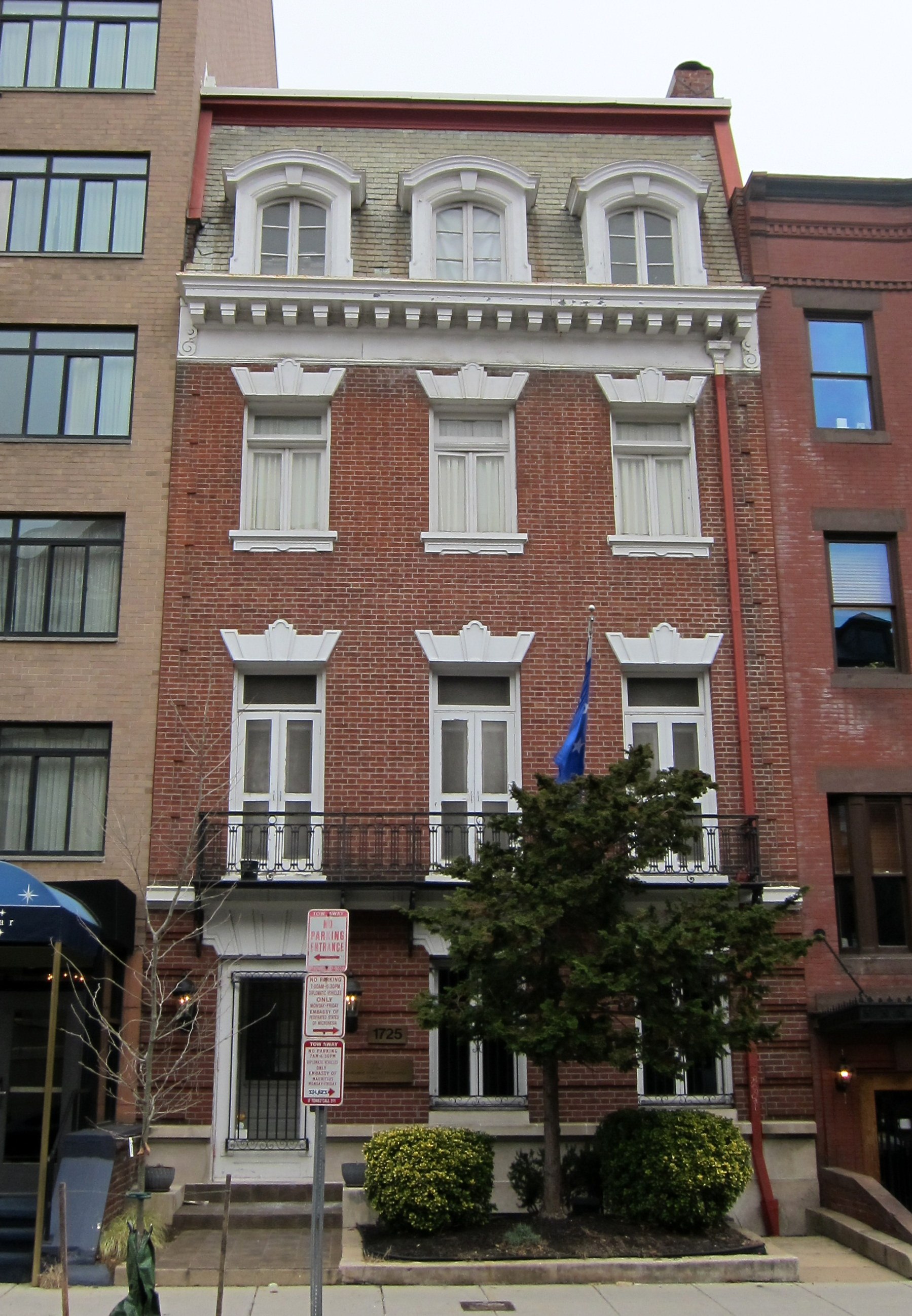
- Inaugural holder: Jesse Bibiano Marehalau
- Formation: December 21, 1987

The Micronesian ambassador in Washington, D. C. is the official representative of the Government in Palikir to the Government of the United States.

== List of representatives ==
Diplomatic agrément	Diplomatic accreditation	Ambassador	Observations	President of the Federated States of Micronesia	List of presidents of the United States	Term end
November 3, 1986			The Governments of Tosiwo Nakayama and Ronald Reagan formally established relations and agreed to the exchange of representatives.	Tosiwo Nakayama	Ronald Reagan	
November 24, 1987	December 21, 1987	Jesse Bibiano Marehalau		John Haglelgam	Ronald Reagan	
August 24, 1989			By exchange of notes dated August 24, 1989, raised to status of embassy	John Haglelgam	George H. W. Bush	
December 19, 1989	February 5, 1990	Jesse Bibiano Marehalau		John Haglelgam	George H. W. Bush	
May 2, 2008	June 6, 2008	Yosiwo Palikkun George	(* July 24, 1941 in Kosrae ) was elected as the 8th Vice President of the Federated States of Micronesia and was sworn into office on May 11, 2015.	Manny Mori	George W. Bush	
January 13, 2012	January 18, 2012	Asterio R. Takesy	(*Chuuk (formerly Truk) State, Micronesia, on May 25, 1944, ) 1996 Deputy Foreign Minister of the FSM	Manny Mori	Barack Obama	2015
January 10, 2017		Akillino Harris Susaia	2009:FSM EMBASSY TO CHINA Hon. Mr. Akillino H. Susaia Ambassador Extraordinary and Plenipotentiary 1-1-11 Jianguomenwai Diplomatic Compound Chaoyang District, Beijing 100600 People's Republic of China	Peter M. Christian	Barack Obama	2019
