= 2020 in the Federated States of Micronesia =

- Decades: 2000s; 2010s; 2020s
- See also: Other events of 2020; Timeline of the Federated States of Micronesia history

Events in the year 2020 in the Federated States of Micronesia.

== Incumbents ==
- President: David W. Panuelo
- Vice President: Yosiwo George

== Events ==
Ongoing – COVID-19 pandemic in Oceania

- 3 February – President David W. Panuelo signed a declaration banning Micronesian citizens from travelling to China and other affected countries.
- 5 March – The country introduced a strict travel ban, banning anyone who had been in China anytime since January 2020 — or had been in any other affected country in the last 14 days — from entering Micronesia.
- 18 March – All schools in the country were closed.
- 14 September – It was announced that President David W. Panuelo and the leaders of Kiribati, Palau, Nauru and the Marshall Islands will be hosting an in-person meeting. President of Nauru Lionel Aingimea said the leaders agreed to attend Palau's Independence Day on October 1 as the five Pacific countries remain free of COVID-19.

== Deaths ==
- 26 January – Robert Weilbacher, Governor of Kosrae 2007–2011 (b. 1946).
