= 1979 Micronesian general election =

1979 Micronesian parliamentary election
27 March 1979	1981 →

All 14 seats in Congress
Elected President
Tosiwo Nakayama

Parliamentary elections were held in the Federated States of Micronesia on 27 March 1979. All candidates for seats in Congress ran as independents.

== Electoral system ==
The 14-member Congress consisted of four at-large members (one from each state) elected for four-year terms, and ten other members elected for two-year terms.

== Results ==
State	Seat	Elected member
Kosrae	Four-year	Joab Sigrah
Kosrae	Two-year	Hirosi Ismael
Ponape	Four-year	Bailey Olter
Ponape	Two-year	Peter M. Christian
Ponape	Two-year	Bethwel Henry
Ponape	Two-year	Elias Thomas
Truk	Four-year	Tosiwo Nakayama
Truk	Two-year	Julio Akapito
Truk	Two-year	Masachiro Christlip
Truk	Two-year	Sasauo Gouland
Truk	Two-year	Kalisto Refolopei
Truk	Two-year	Raymond Setik
Yap	Four-year	Petrus Tun
Yap	Two-year	Luke Tman
Source: Highlights

== Aftermath ==
Following the elections, the newly elected Congress met for the first time on 10 May. Bethwel Henry was elected Speaker. Members of Congress subsequently elected Tosiwo Nakayama as the first President of Micronesia, with Petrus Tun elected vice-president. This led to both vacating their seats in Congress. In the subsequent by-elections on 13 June, Koichi Sana was elected to the four-year seat in Truk and John Haglelgam (a write-in candidate) was elected in the four-year seat in Yap.
