= 2018 in the Federated States of Micronesia =

- Decades: 1990s; 2000s; 2010s; 2020s
- See also: Other events of 2018; Timeline of the Federated States of Micronesia history

Events in the year 2018 in the Federated States of Micronesia.

== Incumbents ==
- President: Peter M. Christian
- Vice President: Yosiwo George

== Events ==
- 28 September – Crash landing of the Air Niugini Flight 73

== Deaths ==
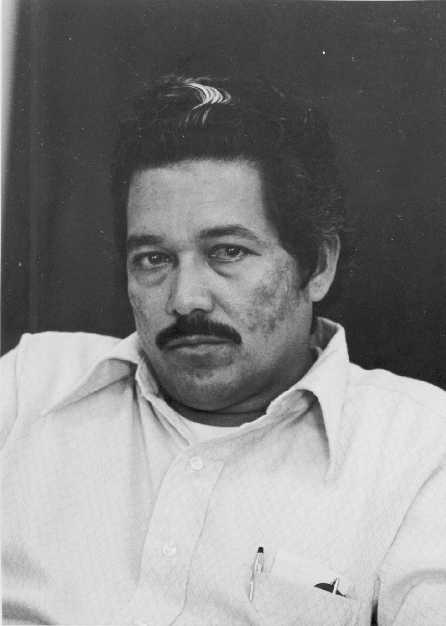
Leo Falcam

- 12 February – Leo Falcam, President 1999–2003 (b. 1935).
