= 1999 Micronesian general election =

1999 Micronesian parliamentary election
- 2 March 1999

All 14 seats in Congress
President before election
Jacob Nena
Elected President
Leo Falcam

Parliamentary elections were held in the Federated States of Micronesia on 2 March 1999. All candidates for seats in Congress ran as independents.

== Results ==
State	District	Candidate	Votes	%	Notes
Chuuk	At-Large	Redley A. Killion	11,810	68.53	Elected
Chuuk	At-Large	Maketo Robert	5,424	31.47	
Chuuk	Election District 1	Nishima Yleizah	1,966	46.57	Elected
Chuuk	Election District 1	Herner Braiel	1,575	37.30	
Chuuk	Election District 1	Fiuling Ruben	681	16.13	
Chuuk	Election District 2	Roosevelt Kansou	2,699	63.58	Elected
Chuuk	Election District 2	Baltazar Bossy	1,546	36.42	
Chuuk	Election District 3	Jack Fritz	—		Elected unopposed
Chuuk	Election District 4	John Petewon	1,644	54.22	Elected
Chuuk	Election District 4	Siwiter Sachuo	1,388	45.78	
Chuuk	Election District 5	Simeon Innocenti	1,434	71.84	Elected
Chuuk	Election District 5	Ada Smith	562	28.16	
Kosrae	At-Large	Jocob Nena	1,982	53.42	Elected
Kosrae	At-Large	Yosiwo P. George	1,728	46.58	
Kosrae	Election District	Claude Phillip	1,432	38.89	Elected
Kosrae	Election District	Moses Mackwelung	1,106	30.04	
Kosrae	Election District	Renster P. Andrew	1,101	29.90	
Kosrae	Election District	Wilson I. J. Melander	43	1.17	
Pohnpei	At-Large	Leo A. Falcam	5,804	52.00	Elected
Pohnpei	At-Large	Resio S. Moses	5,358	48.00	
Pohnpei	Election District 1	Dohsis S. Halbert	—		Elected unopposed
Pohnpei	Election District 2	Wagner M. Lawrence	—		Elected unopposed
Pohnpei	Election District 3	Peter M. Christian	—		Elected unopposed
Yap	At-Large	Joseph Urusemal	2,402	68.86	Elected
Yap	At-Large	Ragalmar Subolmar	1,086	31.14	
Yap	Election District	Isaac V. Figir	2,699	76.83	Elected
Yap	Election District	James Lukan	814	23.17	
Source: Psephos, IPU
