= 2025 in the Federated States of Micronesia =

- Decades: 2000s; 2010s; 2020s
- See also: Other events of 2025; Timeline of the Federated States of Micronesia history

Events in the year 2025 in the Federated States of Micronesia.

== Incumbents ==
- President: Wesley Simina
- Vice President: Aren Palik

== Events ==
- March 4 – 2025 Micronesian parliamentary election
- March 29 – Two sailors are rescued off the coast of Namoluk.

== Holidays ==
- January 1 – New Year's Day
- January 11 – Constitution Day (Kosrae)
- March 31 – Micronesian Culture and Traditions Day
- April 18 – Good Friday
- May 10 – Constitution Day
- August 21 – Gospel Day (Kosrae)
- September 8 – Liberation Day (Kosrae)
- September 11 – Liberation Day (Pohnpei)
- October 1 – Constitution Day (Chuuk)
- October 14 – United Nations Day
- November 3 – Independence Day
- November 8 – Constitution Day (Pohnpei)
- November 11 – Veterans Day
- November 23 – Presidents Day
- November 28 – Thanksgiving
- December 24 – Constitution Day (Yap)
- December 25 – Christmas Day

== Deaths ==
- September 16 – Joseph Urusemal, 73, president (2003–2007)
- November 15 – Lorin S. Robert, 69, minister of foreign affairs (2007–2019, since 2023)
