= Carmen Mutnguy Tun =

Micronesian teacher, historian (1939–2016)

Second Lady of the Federated States of Micronesia
- In role May 11, 1979 – 1983
- President: Tosiwo Nakayama
- Succeeded by: Amalia Nanpei Olter

Personal details
- Born: Carmen Mutnguy; April 6, 1939 Yap, Micronesia
- Died: December 8, 2016 (aged 77) Yap, Micronesia
- Spouse: Petrus Tun (1964–death)
- Children: Petra Giltiningin-Fattinan, Jonathan Machieng Tun, Daniel Ruegrong, Thomas Gilwuyoch Tun, Tresa Tidad Tun, Joseph Choorang Tun, and David Tun

Carmen M. Tun (April 14, 1939 – December 8, 2016), also known as Carmen Mutnguy, was a teacher, Yapese historian, linguist, and grassroots advocate from Yap, Micronesia. She was married to the first Vice President of the Federated States of Micronesia, Petrus Tun. She was also First Lady to the second Governor of Yap from 1987–1995.

== Career ==
In the early 1960s, Carmen Mutnguy was a teacher, and an officer of the Yap Women's Association (YWA) which she co-founded with members of the women of Yap. She also served as Post Master of the Yap branch of the FSM Postal Service, and retired on April 6, 2000.

== Books ==
In 1960, Carmen M. Tun, put down the Legend of Manbuth, a local Yapese tale. She was instrumental in the translation of the Bible to the Yapese language.
