= 2022 in the Federated States of Micronesia =

- Decades: 2000s; 2010s; 2020s
- See also: Other events of 2022; Timeline of the Federated States of Micronesia history

Events in the year 2022 in the Federated States of Micronesia.

== Incumbents ==
- President: David W. Panuelo
- Vice President
  - Yosiwo George (until 13 August)
  - Aren Palik (from 13 September)

== Events ==
Ongoing — COVID-19 pandemic in Oceania

=== February ===
- 25 February – The FSM severed all diplomatic relations with the Russian Federation due to the "unjustified and brutal invasion of Ukraine". The Office of the President maintained that diplomatic relations will be entertained once Russia demonstrates its commitments to world peace, friendship, and common humanity instead of war and conflicts. Thus, the diplomatic relations count for the FSM fell down to 88 UN states.

=== March ===
- 2 March – The FSM voted on a United Nations resolution condemning Russia for its invasion of Ukraine.
