= 2021 in the Federated States of Micronesia =

- Decades: 2000s; 2010s; 2020s
- See also: Other events of 2021; Timeline of the Federated States of Micronesia history

Events in the year 2021 in the Federated States of Micronesia.

== Incumbents ==
- President: David W. Panuelo
- Vice President: Yosiwo George

== Events ==
Ongoing — COVID-19 pandemic in Oceania

=== Scheduled events ===
- 2 March – Scheduled date for the 2021 Micronesian parliamentary election.
