= Vice President of the Federated States of Micronesia =

Deputy head of state and government of Federated States of Micronesia

The vice president of Federated States of Micronesia is the second highest position in Federated States of Micronesia (FSM). The vice president is elected by the FSM Congress from among the at-large members for a four-year term. The vice president is also a part of the legislature. The annual salary of the vice president is set to US$70,000.

The history of the office holders is as follows:

== List of officeholders ==
No.	Portrait	Name (Birth–Death)	Term of office			Political party	Election	President
No.	Portrait	Name (Birth–Death)	Took office	Left office	Time in office	Political party	Election	President
1	Portrait of Petrus Tun	Petrus Tun (1935–1999)	11 May 1979	11 May 1983	4 years	Independent	1979	Tosiwo Nakayama
2	Portrait of Bailey Olter	Bailey Olter (1933–1999)	11 May 1983	11 May 1987	4 years	Independent	1983	Tosiwo Nakayama
3	Portrait of Hirosi Ismael	Hirosi Ismael (1937–2008)	11 May 1987	11 May 1991	4 years	Independent	1987	John Haglelgam
4	Portrait of Jacob Nena	Jacob Nena (1941–2022)	11 May 1991	8 November 1996	5 years, 181 days	Independent	1991	Bailey Olter
4	Portrait of Jacob Nena	Jacob Nena (1941–2022)	11 May 1991	8 November 1996	5 years, 181 days	Independent	1995	Bailey Olter
Vacant (8 November 1996 – 8 May 1997)								Jacob Nena
5	Portrait of Leo Falcam	Leo Falcam (1935–2018)	8 May 1997	11 May 1999	2 years, 3 days	Independent	—	Jacob Nena
6	Portrait of Redley A. Killion	Redley A. Killion (born 1951)	11 May 1999	11 May 2007	8 years	Independent	1999	Leo Falcam
6	Portrait of Redley A. Killion	Redley A. Killion (born 1951)	11 May 1999	11 May 2007	8 years	Independent	2003	Joseph Urusemal
7	Portrait of Alik Alik	Alik Alik (born 1953)	11 May 2007	11 May 2015	8 years	Independent	2007	Manny Mori
7	Portrait of Alik Alik	Alik Alik (born 1953)	11 May 2007	11 May 2015	8 years	Independent	2011	Manny Mori
8	Portrait of Yosiwo George	Yosiwo George (1941–2022)	11 May 2015	13 August 2022 †	7 years, 94 days	Independent	2015	Peter M. Christian
8	Portrait of Yosiwo George	Yosiwo George (1941–2022)	11 May 2015	13 August 2022 †	7 years, 94 days	Independent	2019	David Panuelo
Vacant (13 August – 13 September 2022)								David Panuelo
9	Portrait of Aren Palik	Aren Palik (born 19??)	13 September 2022	Incumbent (Note: Palik's current mandate expires on 11 May 2027; he is eligible for re-election.)	3 years, 185 days	Independent	—	David Panuelo
9	Portrait of Aren Palik	Aren Palik (born 19??)	13 September 2022	Incumbent	3 years, 185 days	Independent	2023	Wesley Simina

== See also ==
- President of the Federated States of Micronesia
- List of current vice presidents
