= Gerson Jackson =

Gerson Jackson is a Micronesian politician and diplomat.

Jackson served as the Lieutenant Governor of Kosrae for two-consecutive terms from 1995 to 2007. He was first elected Lieutenant Governor in 1994 as the running mate of Moses Mackwelung. Mackwelung and Jackson were sworn into office on January 9, 1995. Jackson was re-elected as Lieutenant Governor in 1998 as the running mate of gubernatorial candidate, Rensley Sigrah. Sigrah and Jackson were inaugurated on January 12, 1999.

Gerson Jackson served as Consul-General of the Federated States of Micronesia to Guam from 2008 to October 17, 2011. He was confirmed to the office in April 2008, in a unanimous 12–0 vote by the Micronesian Congress. During his tenure, Jackson criticized increased tensions toward Micronesian migrants in Guam, especially on issues of crime and deportation. Jackson served as Consul-General until October 17, 2011, when his successor, Robert Ruecho, was sworn into office by President Manny Mori.

Jackson became the Ambassador of the Federated States of Micronesia to Fiji on October 17, 2011. President Manny Mori administered the oath of office to Jackson at the International Trade Center in Guam at 11:30 a.m.
