= 2007 Micronesian presidential election =

Indirect presidential elections were held in the Federated States of Micronesia on May 11, 2007.

Incumbent President Joseph Urusemal was defeated for re-election by challenger Manny Mori at the opening session of the newly elected 15th Congress of Micronesia.

The Congress also elected Alik L. Alik to serve as the new vice-president.

Flag of the Federated States of Micronesia

== Background ==
Micronesia is an electoral democracy and has a population of about 550,000 people, not including the Marshall Islands. Micronesia is made up of 607 islands that are grouped into four individual states. Because there are only four states, each state has its own constitution, elected legislature, and governor. State governments in Micronesia have a great deal of power, especially in budgetary matters. Traditional leaders and institutions also hold significant influence in society, especially at the village level.

The Federated States of Micronesia is governed by the 1979 constitution, which guarantees fundamental human rights and establishes a separation of governmental powers. The unicameral Congress has fourteen members elected by popular vote. Four senators—one from each state—serve four-year terms; the remaining ten senators represent single-member districts based on population, and serve two-year terms. The president and vice president are then elected by Congress from among the four state-based senators to serve four-year terms in the executive branch. Their congressional seats are then filled by special elections. The president and vice president are supported by an appointed cabinet. There are no formal political parties.

== Candidates ==
The candidate list for the 2007 presidential election was as follows: Resio Moses of Pohnpei State; Manny Mori of Chuuk State; Alik Alik of Kosrae State; and Joseph Urusemal of Yap State, who was the sitting president.

Essentially, the election held one representative from each state. In this election, however, many of the candidates were running conditionally in terms of which position (president or vice president) they win. Resio Moses was not interested in the president or vice president positions, while Manny Mori publicly stated that he was only interested in the presidency and would not accept the lesser vice president position under any circumstance. Alik Alik would have accepted the vice presidency but only if Joseph Urusemal was re-elected as president for a second term.

Resio Moses was one of the founding fathers of the Federated States of Micronesia and was the first governor of the state of Pohnpei. He later became the secretary of the Department of External Affairs. He also became Micronesia's ambassador in the United Nations, where he was a key player in the establishment of diplomatic and relations with multiple countries and global organizations. Moses became a member of the 10th Micronesian Congress in 1997 and has been a member ever since. He had held multiple other positions over the years, including chairman, vice chairman, and member of a number of congressional committees prior to his running for the presidency.

Manny Mori received a Bachelor of Arts degree in business management from the University of Guam and spent a year working for the Guam Citicorp Credit Union. Shortly after, he became the assistant manager for the Saipan branch of Citicorp Credit Union and a few years later moved on to be the assistant administrator for the Trust Territory Social Security Administration. When Micronesia became a sovereign state in 1979, Mori became the first national revenue officer for the State of Chuuk. After two years of working for the Chuuk state government, Mori was hired as the comptroller of the Micronesia Development Bank. Three years after joining the bank, Mori was promoted President and Chief Executive Officer of the Development Bank. In 1997, Six years later, Mori moved to the Bank of the Federated States. Mori became involved in politics in 1999 when he became Chuuk's representative to the 11th FSM Congress, where he held two positions: vice chairmanship on the committee of Judiciary and Governmental Operations (J&GO) and the committee on Health Education and Social Affairs (HESA). Three years later, Mori took on the chairmanship of the committee on Ways and Means while still maintaining his membership on the committees mentioned above. In 2003, Mori took a break from politics and became the general manager and chief executive officer for the Chuuk Public Utilities Corporation. Under his management, the corporation successfully executed progressive reform measures that include the restoration of 24-hour electricity to Weno, the capital island of Chuuk State. The next year, Mori re-entered the field of politics as Chuuk's four year representative to the Micronesian Congress. In that Congress, he served as the vice chairman of the Committee on External Affairs and held membership in a handful of other committees.

Alik L. Alik had been involved in government and politics since the start of his career by interning for the government of the Trust Territory of the Pacific Islands (TTPI) within the Department of Education. Shortly after his time with the government, he went on to University of Hawaii Law School – Paralegal Program. Upon completing the two-year program in 1984, he was immediately hired by the FSM Supreme Court to be a law clerk. In the Department of External Affairs hired him as a foreign service officer and was soon promoted to deputy chief in the Division of South Pacific Affairs. In 1989 he became Micronesia's first ambassador to Fiji and to most of the island nations within the south Pacific and held the post for the next nine years. As the ambassador to Fiji, Alik was also associated to Israel, Tonga, Nauru, Kiribati, Samoa, Tuvalu, Solomon Islands and Vanuatu. In 1992, he earned the title Dean of the Diplomatic Corp of Fiji. In 1998 Alik was again appointed to represent the nation, as Micronesia's ambassador to Japan. He again was associated with various nations in Asia, specifically; China, South Korea, India, Malaysia, Indonesia and Singapore. In 2003, Senator Alik joined electoral politics and won the State of Kosrae congressional seat and was also elected to be the chairman of the committee on Resource and Development. He was also a member of the committees of Judiciary & Governmental Operations and External Affairs. Senator Alik also held the chairmanship for the Standing Committee on Foreign Affairs.

Joseph Urusemal received his Bachelor of Arts degree in administration of justice in 1976 and went to work for the Jackson County Department of Correction. He worked for the government of Jackson County for about six years until he returned to Micronesia in 1982. Upon his arrival to Micronesia, he worked with the State Department of Education as a teacher and counselor at the Outer Islands High School. During his tenure, he served on the Education Steering Committee where he was a key player in establishing Yap's State Education Five Year Plan. Urusemal was elected as Yap State's representative to the Fifth Congress of Micronesia. He also held membership on the following committees: Health Education and Social Affairs; Resources and Development; and External Affairs. Urusemal held his seat in the next Congress until he was selected to be the floor leader of the Seventh Micronesian Congress. He was also a member on the following standing committees: Health, Education, and Social Affairs; Resources and Development; Transportation and Communication; and Judiciary and Governmental Operations. During the next five congresses, Urusemal held his role as Floor Leader of the Congress and his membership on the same four standing committees. Joseph Urusemal was the vice chairman of the Joint Committee on Compact Economic Negotiations and was the chairman of the Working Group. During his tenure in Congress, Urusemal also served as the secretary general for the National Group to the Asia-Pacific Parliamentarians' Union. On May 11, 2003, Joseph J. Urusemal was seated as the sixth president of Micronesia.

== Election result ==
A total of 117,977 people were registered to vote in the congressional election; however, only 39,067 votes were cast. Despite the exceptionally low turnout, Freedom House claims that it hardly affects the results of the congressional election, which directly affects the presidential election, due to Micronesia's high freedom rating. Micronesia is ranked as a 1 on Freedom House's scale of 1 being most free and 7 being the least. They are also ranked 1 in terms of civil liberties and political rights. Manny Mori won the presidency while Alik L. Alik won the vice presidency. There are no public records in regards to the vote distribution; however, Jack Corbett of the University of Southampton speculates that Mori won the presidency owing to his experience in business. It is for the same reason that Alik was elected vice president, because he has a great deal of international experience. Being a small nation, Micronesia has a great desire to be more involved with the global marketplace and wanted a leader with experience in that area to drive them forward. Mori also gained a lot of popularity because it was the first time that his state, Chuuk which consists of 16 islands, approached the election with a unified delegation and support for Mori.
