= Strik =

Strik is a Dutch surname. Its origin may be toponymic or be related to one of the meanings of the Dutch words strik or strijk. Notable people with the name include:

- Berend Strik (born 1960), Dutch visual artist
- Ielja Strik (born 1973), Dutch powerlifter
- Pleun Strik (1944–2022), Dutch football defender
- Reshad Strik (born 1981), Australian actor
- Tineke Strik (born 1961), Dutch GreenLeft politician
- Wilfried Strik-Strikfeldt (1896–1977), Baltic German army officer

== See also ==
- Strik Yoma (died 1984), Micronesian politician
- Strick, variant form of the surname
