= Iris Falcam =

Federated States of Micronesia librarian (1938–2010)

Iris Green Falcam

First Lady of the Federated States of Micronesia
- In office May 11, 1999 – May 11, 2003
- Preceded by: Lerina Nena
- Succeeded by: Olania Latileilam Urusemal

Personal details
- Born: August 25, 1938 Honolulu
- Died: February 19, 2010 (aged 71) Pohnpei, Federated States of Micronesia
- Spouse: Leo Falcam

Iris Green Falcam (August 25, 1938 – February 19, 2010) was an American-born Micronesian librarian, researcher and public servant. Falcam served as the First Lady of the Federated States of Micronesia from 1999 to 2003 during the tenure of her husband, former President Leo Falcam.

Iris Falcam was a native of Hawaii, but resided in what is now the Federated States of Micronesia for more than forty years. She attended both the University of Hawaiʻi at Mānoa and Kapiolani Technical School, which is now called Kapiʻolani Community College.

Falcam worked as the librarian and researcher for the College of Micronesia-FSM Pacific Islands collection from 1979 until her death in 2010. She also worked as the librarian for the Congress of the Federated States of Micronesia, as well as for the public information office at the Trust Territory of the Pacific Islands headquarters on Saipan earlier in her career. Falcam's numerous civic involvements in the FSM included a seat on the board of Pohnpei Catholic School, treasurer of the Pohnpei Lions Club and membership in a Catholic women's organization called Lih en Mercedes.

Iris Green Falcam died on 19 February 2010 in Pohnpei."
