= Robert Weilbacher =

Micronesian politician (1946–2020)

Robert James Weilbacher, Sr.

Governor of Kosrae
- In office February 23, 2007 – January 11, 2011
- Lieutenant: William Tosie
- Preceded by: Lyndon Jackson (acting)
- Succeeded by: Lyndon Jackson

Personal details
- Born: 14 September 1946 South Seas Mandate
- Died: 26 January 2020 (aged 73) Finanpes, Kosrae, Federated States of Micronesia
- Spouse: Josepha Arriola Weilbacher
- Education: Philippine Merchant Marine Academy

Robert James Weilbacher, Sr. (14 September 1946 – 26 January 2020) was a Micronesian politician and former Governor of Kosrae state. Weilbacher served as the governor of Kosrae from February 2007 until January 2011.

Governor Robert James Weilbacher and Lt. Governor William Tosie were sworn into office on February 23, 2007. Their public inauguration was held on March 13, 2007, with Micronesian President Joseph Urusemal in attendance.

Weilbacher inherited a poor economy and massive public debt left by the administration of outgoing Kosrae Governor Rensley A. Sigrah. The Kosrae state government was barely able to make payroll due to financial mismanagement when Weilbacher took office. On March 8, 2007, just days after taking office as governor, Weilbacher traveled to the Micronesian capital of Palikir to request nearly $3 million in financial aid to "make payroll and meet basic services" for the remainder of the financial year. Weilbacher spearheaded government reforms saying in a 2007 interview, "I want us to change how we operate. Change the way we think about government."

Governor Weilbacher did not seek a second term in office in the 2009 gubernatorial election. His successor, Governor Lyndon Jackson, thanked Weilbacher for reforming Kosrae's government and economy during his inaugural address in January 2011.
