= 2007 Micronesian general election =

- 6 March 2007

All 14 seats in Congress
- Presidential election
- 11 May 2007
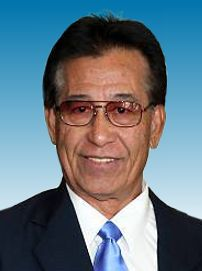

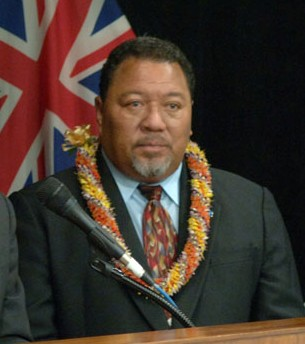
Nominee	Manny Mori	Joseph Urusemal
Electoral vote	Won	Lost
President before election
Joseph Urusemal
Elected President
Manny Mori

Parliamentary elections were held in the Federated States of Micronesia on 6 March 2007, alongside a double referendum. Thirty-five candidates competed for the fourteen seats in Congress. As there were no political parties, all candidates ran as independents.

In the referendums voters were asked whether they approved of two proposed amendments to the constitution, both of which had been put forward in 2005 and rejected. These would give the states credit for their acts, and lift the ban on dual citizenship. The proposed amendments required a 75% majority in at least three of the four states. However, whilst both proposals were approved by a majority of voters, the 75% threshold was only passed in Kosrae.

== Results ==
=== Congress ===
Party	Votes	%	Seats
Independents	48,673	100	14
Total	48,673	100	14
Registered voters/turnout	92,573	52.58	–
Source: IPU

=== Referendums ===
==== States ====
It is hereby proposed that a new Section 8 of Article XIII of the Constitution of the Federated States of Micronesia be amended to read as follows:

Section 8. Full faith and credit shall be given in each state to the public acts, records and judicial proceedings of every other state. Congress may prescribe by statute the manner in which such acts, records and judicial proceedings shall be proved and the effect thereof

DO YOU APPROVE OF THIS PROPOSED AMENDMENT TO THE CONSTITUTION?

Choice	Popular vote		State vote
Choice	Votes	%	State vote
For		66	1
Against		34	3
Invalid/blank votes		–	–
Total		100	4
Registered voters/turnout			–
Source: Direct Democracy

==== Dual citizenship ====
It is hereby proposed that a new Section 8 of Article XIII of the Constitution of the Federated States of Micronesia be amended to read as follows:

Section 8. Full faith and credit shall be given in each state to the public acts, records and judicial proceedings of every other state. Congress may prescribe by statute the manner in which such acts, records and judicial proceedings shall be proved and the effect thereof.

DO YOU APPROVE OF THIS PROPOSED AMENDMENT TO THE CONSTITUTION?

Choice	Popular vote		State vote
Choice	Votes	%	State vote
For		64	1
Against		36	3
Invalid/blank votes		–	–
Total		100	4
Registered voters/turnout			–
Source: Direct Democracy
