= 2023 in the Federated States of Micronesia =

- Decades: 2000s; 2010s; 2020s
- See also: Other events of 2023; Timeline of the Federated States of Micronesia history

Events in the year 2023 in the Federated States of Micronesia.

== Incumbents ==
- President: David Panuelo (until May 11), Wesley Simina (from May 11)
- Vice President: Aren Palik

== Events ==
Ongoing — COVID-19 pandemic in Oceania

- 7 March – 2023 Micronesian parliamentary election
- 4 July – 2023 Micronesian constitutional referendum
