= 1995 Micronesian imports referendum =

A referendum on the powers of the federal government to levy taxes on imports was held in the Federated States of Micronesia on 4 July 1995. Congress had adopted Public Law 8-135 on the matter, which would have altered article II of Chapter IX of the constitution. However, the move was vetoed by President Bailey Olter on 22 March. As a result, the referendum was held alongside by-elections for Congress. A three-quarter majority was required in three of the four states, but the proposal was rejected by voters.
