= 1981 Micronesian general election =

Election

1981 Micronesian parliamentary election
← 1979	3 March 1981	1983 →

10 out of 14 seats in Congress

Parliamentary elections were held in the Federated States of Micronesia on 3 March 1981. All candidates for seats in Congress ran as independents.
