= 1983 Micronesian general election =

1983 Micronesian parliamentary election
- 8 March 1983

14 seats in Congress
President before election
Tosiwo Nakayama
Elected President
Tosiwo Nakayama

Parliamentary elections were held in the Federated States of Micronesia on 8 March 1983. All candidates for seats in Congress ran as independents.

== Results ==
Party	Votes	%	Seats
Independents		100	
Invalid/blank votes		–	–
Total	33,686	100	
Source: Nohlen et al.

== Aftermath ==
Following the elections, Tosiwo Nakayama was unanimously re-elected president. Bailey Olter was elected vice president, defeating incumbent Petrus Tun.
