= 1991 Micronesian general election =

1991 Micronesian parliamentary election
- 5 March 1991

All 14 seats in Congress
President before election
John Haglelgam
Elected President
Bailey Olter

Parliamentary elections were held in the Federated States of Micronesia on 5 March 1991. All candidates for seats in Congress ran as independents.
