= Governor of Kosrae =

The office of the Governor of Kosrae is the highest position in the state of Kosrae, Federated States of Micronesia.

History of the office holders follows.

Image	Name	Inaugurated	Left office	Lieutenant Governor
	Jacob Nena	1 January 1979	3 January 1983	Yosiwo George (1979–1980); Kan N. Sigrah (1980–1983)
	Yosiwo George	3 January 1983	14 January 1991	Moses Mackwelung
	Thurston K. Siba	14 January 1991	9 January 1995	Lyndon Abraham
	Moses T. Mackwelung	9 January 1995	11 January 1999	Gerson Jackson
	Rensley A. Sigrah	11 January 1999	9 January 2007	Gerson Jackson (1999-2007)
	Lyndon Jackson (acting)	9 January 2007	23 February 2007	Vacant
	Robert Weilbacher	23 February 2007	11 January 2011	William Tosie
	Lyndon Jackson	11 January 2011	8 January 2019	Carson Sigrah
	Carson Sigrah	8 January 2019	10 January 2023	Arthy G. Nena
	Tulensa Palik	10 January 2023	Incumbent	Arthy G. Nena
