= Carson Sigrah =

Micronesian politician

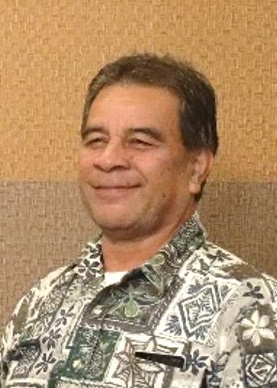
- Sigrah in 2020

Governor of Kosrae
- In office January 8, 2019 – January 10, 2023
- Lieutenant: Arthy G. Nena
- Preceded by: Lyndon Jackson
- Succeeded by: Tulensa Palik

Lieutenant Governor of Kosrae
- In office January 11, 2011 – January 8, 2019
- Governor: Lyndon Jackson
- Preceded by: William Tosie
- Succeeded by: Arthy G. Nena

Carson K. Sigrah (born ?) is a Micronesian politician. Sigrah served as the Governor of Kosrae from 2019 to 2023. He previously served as lieutenant governor from 2011 to 2019 under Governor Lyndon Jackson.

== Political career ==
Sigrah was the running mate of Jackson, who won the initial Kosrae gubernatorial election held on November 2, 2010, with 1,414 votes, but did not passed the 50% threshold, which necessitated a runoff in January 2011. Jackson won the Kosrae gubernatorial runoff election held on January 2, 2011, with 54.4% of the vote to Nena S. Nena's 45.6%, allowing Sigrah to become lieutenant governor.

Jackson and Sigrah were officially sworn into office on January 11, 2011. However, their public inauguration ceremony was held on January 27, 2011. It was also attended by more than 1,000 people and was held at Kosrae High School over the course of two and a half hours.

In the 2018 Kosrae elections, Sigrah was elected Governor of Kosrae. He ran for reelection in 2022 against Tulensa Palik. However, Sigrah lost reelection his bid in the runoff, with Palik winning 59.19% of the vote while Sigrah himself won 40.81%.

In 2023, Carson Sigrah was appointed as teh FSM's ambassador to Fiji.
