= 2024 in the Federated States of Micronesia =

- Decades: 2000s; 2010s; 2020s
- See also: Other events of 2024; Timeline of the Federated States of Micronesia history

Events in the year 2024 in the Federated States of Micronesia.

== Incumbents ==
- President: Wesley Simina
- Vice President: Aren Palik

== Holidays ==
- January 1 - New Year's Day
- January 11 - Constitution Day (Kosrae)
- March 29 - Good Friday
- March 30 - Easter Saturday
- March 31 - Micronesian Culture and Traditions Day
- April 1 -
  - Easter Monday
  - Micronesian Culture and Traditions Holiday
- May 10 - Constitution Day
- August 21 – Gospel Day (Kosrae)
- September 8 – Liberation Day (Kosrae)
- September 11 – Liberation Day (Pohnpei)
- October 1 – Constitution Day (Chuuk)
- October 14 – United Nations Day
- November 3 – Independence Day
- November 8 – Constitution Day (Pohnpei)
- November 11 – Veterans Day
- November 23 – Presidents Day
- November 28 – Thanksgiving
- December 24 - Constitution Day (Yap)
- December 25 - Christmas Day
