= Tulensa Palik =

Governor of Kosrae, Micronesia

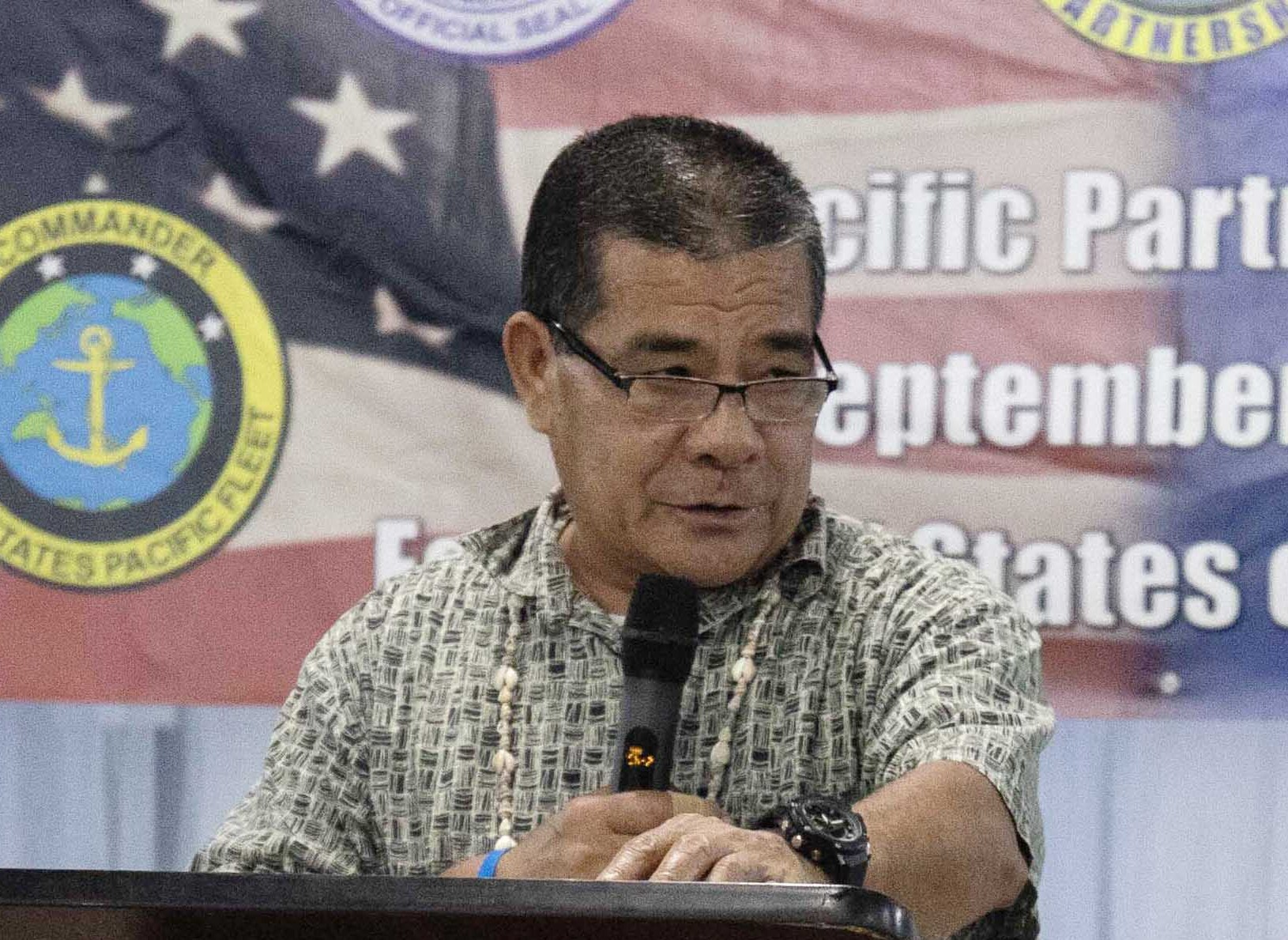
Palik in 2024

Tulensa W. Palik is the current governor of Kosrae, Micronesia.

He ran in the 2022 Kosrae State gubernatorial run-off election against Carson Sigrah. Palik won 59.19% of the vote while Sigrah won 40.81%.

Preceded by Carson Sigrah	Governor of Kosrae; 2022	Succeeded by
