= 2011 Micronesian general election =

- 8 March 2011

All 14 seats in Congress
- Presidential election
- 11 May 2011
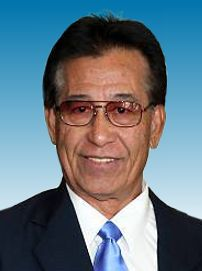
Nominee	Manny Mori
Electoral vote	Acclamation
President before election
Manny Mori
Elected President
Manny Mori

Parliamentary elections were held in the Federated States of Micronesia on 8 March 2011, alongside a three-part referendum. As there were no political parties, all 34 candidates ran as independents. For the first time in the country's history, two women ran for election, both in Chuuk State. However, neither was elected.

The three referendum questions were held on extending the congressional term length to four years for all members (at the time, 10 of the 14 members were only elected for two-year terms), allowing the holding of dual citizenship, and whether a Constitutional Convention should be elected to revise the constitution. Only the latter proposal was approved. However, the convention didn't get elected.

== Electoral system ==
The 14 seats in Congress consist of 10 seats elected every two years, and four "at large" seats elected every four years. The 2011 election was one in which all 14 seats were up for election. Around 92,000 voters registered for the elections.

Two of the referendum questions, on congressional term lengths and dual citizenship, involved amending the constitution. In order to pass, they required the approval of at least 75% of voters in at least three of the four states. The third referendum on calling a Constitutional Convention is required every ten years by article 2 of Chapter XIV of the constitution, and required only a simple majority at the national level.

== Campaign ==
President Manny Mori was challenged by Anna Asauo Wengu, one of the two women candidates. He promised to increase the amount of foreign investment in order to develop the country's fishing industry, as well as campaigning on the importance of connecting the four states by fibre optic cable. He also promised to focus on education, including the provision of financial assistance for post-graduates.

The other female candidate, Augustina Takashy, ran against Joe Suka, the leader of the Floor in Congress. She campaigned on investing in job creation and ensuring that basic social services were affordable to all, as well as promising to work on gender issues.

== Constitutional changes ==
The two referendum questions involving changing the constitution would have altered chapters III, IX and X of the document.

=== Term length amendments ===
Section	Existing text	Proposed text
Chapter IX article 8	The Congress consists of one member elected at large from each state on the basis of state equality, and additional members elected from congressional districts in each state apportioned by population. Members elected on the basis of state equality serve for a four (4) year term, and all other members for 2 years. Each member has one vote, except on the final reading of bills. Congressional elections are held biennially as provided by statute.	The Congress consists of one member elected at large from each state on the basis of state equality, and additional members elected from congressional districts in each state apportioned by population. Members serve for a four (4) year term. Each member has one vote, except on the final reading of bills. Congressional elections are held biennially as provided by statute.
Chapter X article 4	A person is ineligible to become President unless he is a member of Congress for a 4-year term, a citizen of the Federated States of Micronesia by birth, and a resident of the Federated States of Micronesia for at least 15 years.	A person is ineligible to become President unless he is a member of Congress elected at large from a state on the basis of state equality, a citizen of the Federated States of Micronesia by birth, and a resident of the Federated States of Micronesia for at least 15 years.

=== Dual citizenship amendment ===
The dual citizenship amendment would be achieved by removing article 3 of Chapter III:

A citizen of the Federated States of Micronesia who is recognized as a citizen of another nation shall, within 3 years of his 18th birthday, or within 3 years of the effective date of this Constitution, whichever is later, register his intent to remain a citizen of the Federated States and renounce his citizenship of another nation. If he fails to comply with this Section, he becomes a national of the Federated States of Micronesia.

== Results ==
=== Congress ===
Party	Seats
Independents	14
Total	14
Source: IPU

=== Referendums ===
==== Four year term of office for all Congress members ====
Choice	Votes	%	States
For	23,475	58.99	0
Against	16,319	41.01	4
Total	39,794	100	4
Source: Direct Democracy

==== Lifting the ban on dual citizenship ====
Choice	Votes	%	States
For	26,076	66.31	0
Against	13,247	33.69	4
Total	39,323	100	4
Source: Direct Democracy

==== Calling a Constitutional Convention ====
Choice	Votes	%
For	15,850	65.46
Against	8,362	34.54
Total	24,212	100
Source: Direct Democracy

== Presidential election ==
An indirect election to elect the president was held in the Federated States of Micronesia on 11 May 2011, following the parliamentary election on 8 March 2011. Incumbent president Manny Mori was reelected.
