= Lyndon Jackson =

Micronesian politician

Lyndon H. Jackson
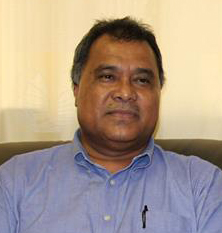
- Jackson in 2013

Governor of Kosrae
- In office 11 January 2011 – 8 January 2019
- Lieutenant: Carson K. Sigrah
- Preceded by: Robert Weilbacher
- Succeeded by: Carson K. Sigrah

Lyndon H. Jackson (born ?) is a Micronesian politician. A former Speaker of the Eighth and Ninth Kosrae State Legislatures, Jackson has served as the Governor of Kosrae from 11 January 2011 to 8 January 2019, with Lt. Governor Carson K. Sigrah. He succeeded outgoing Governor Robert J. Weilbacher.

Jackson won the initial Kosrae gubernatorial election held on November 2, 2011, with 1,414 votes, but failed to pass the 50% threshold, which necessitated a runoff in January 2011. Nena S. Nena earned 1,129, qualifying him for the runoff against Jackson. Outgoing Kosrae Lt. Governor William O. Tosie placed third with 869 votes while former Kosrae Governor Rensley A. Sigrah came in fourth place with 824 votes. Jackson won the Kosrae gubernatorial runoff election held on January 2, 2011, with 54.4% of the vote to Nena S. Nena's 45.6%.

Jackson and Sigrah were officially sworn into office on January 11, 2011, However, Jackson's public inauguration ceremony was held on January 27, 2011. Jackson's inauguration, which was attended by more than 1,000 people, was held at Kosrae High School over the course of two and a half hours.

In his inaugural address, Governor Jackson called private sector economic growth, as well as government transparency and accountability, telling the audience that, "I will work hard to restore trust in the Government and its people." Jackson also thanked his predecessor, former Governor Robert Weilbacher, for his work in reforming Kosrae's government and economy.
