= 1987 Micronesian general election =

1987 Micronesian parliamentary election
- 3 March 1987

All 14 seats in Congress
President before election
Tosiwo Nakayama
Elected President
John Haglelgam

Parliamentary elections were held in the Federated States of Micronesia on 3 March 1987 alongside a referendum on having a four-year term of office for all members of Congress. All candidates for seats in Congress ran as independents, whilst the referendum proposal was rejected by voters.

== Results ==
=== Referendum ===
Choice	Popular vote		State vote
Choice	Votes	%	State vote
For	11,984	37.37	0
Against	20,079	62.63	4
Invalid/blank votes		–	–
Total	32,063	100	4
Registered voters/turnout			–
Source: Direct Democracy

==== By state ====
State	For		Against		Total
State	Votes	%	Votes	%	Total
Chuuk	6,618	37.34	11,104	62.66	17,722
Kosrae	1,040	50.58	1,016	49.42	2,056
Pohnpei	4,125	36.62	7,139	63.38	11,264
Yap	201	19.69	820	80.31	1,021
Source: Direct Democracy
