= 1995 Micronesian general election =

1995 Micronesian parliamentary election
- 20 March 1995

All 14 seats in Congress
President before election
Bailey Olter
Elected President
Bailey Olter

Parliamentary elections were held in the Federated States of Micronesia on 20 March 1995. All candidates for seats in Congress ran as independents.

== Results ==
Party	Votes	%	Seats
Independents		100	14
Invalid/blank votes		-	-
Total		100	14
Source: IPU
