= Strik Yoma =

Micronesian politician (1937–1984)

1st Lieutenant Governor of Pohnpei
- In office May 1, 1979 – May 1, 1983
- Governor: Leo Falcam
- Preceded by: Office created
- Succeeded by: Johnny P. David

Personal details
- Born: February 16, 1937
- Died: September 2, 1984 (aged 47)
- Spouse: Sizue “Suzie” G. Yoma
- Children: Five

Strik Yoma (February 16, 1937 – September 2, 1984) was a Micronesian politician. Yoma served as the first elected Lieutenant Governor of Pohnpei under then-Governor Leo Falcam from May 1, 1979, until May 1, 1983.

Strik Yoma married his wife, Sizue “Suzie” G. Yoma, on July 6, 1967. The couple had five children - Norton Yoma (born 1968), Melina Yoma (born 1969), Manuel Yoma (born 1972), Neong Yoma (born 1974) and Esuroi Yoma (born 1977), who was adopted.

Strik Yoma died on September 2, 1984.
