= Redley A. Killion =

Micronesian politician and public servant (born 1951)

Redley Killion
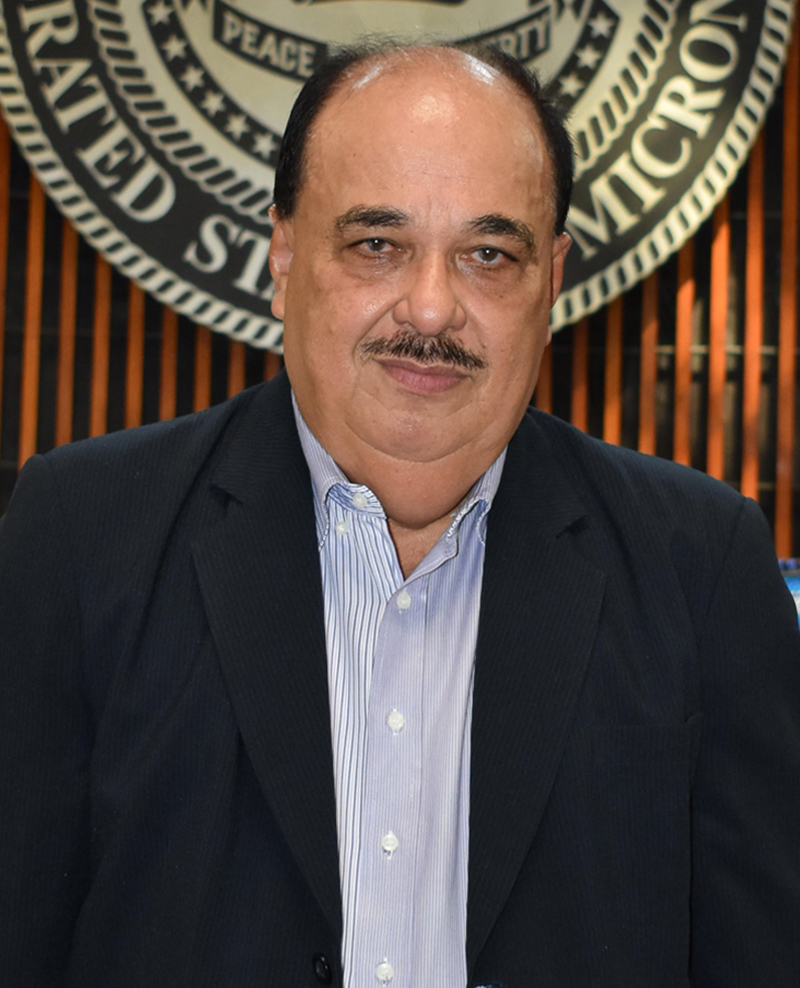
- Killion in 2020

6th Vice President of Micronesia
- In office 11 May 1999 – 11 May 2007
- President: Leo Falcam (1999–2003); Joseph Urusemal (2003–2007)
- Preceded by: Leo Falcam
- Succeeded by: Alik Alik

Personal details
- Born: 23 October 1951 (age 74) Chuuk, Micronesia
- Party: Independent

Redley A. Killion (born 23 October 1951) is a Micronesian politician and public servant, who served two consecutive terms as the sixth Vice President of the Federated States of Micronesia from May 1999 to May 2007.

== Early life and education ==
Killion is from Chuuk State. He holds a Bachelor of Arts degree in economics from the University of Hawaii at Manoa and a Master of Arts degree in economics from Vanderbilt University.

== Career ==
Killion began his career in 1974 working at the Department of Resources and Development, and served as the first director of Department of Resources and Development, Chuuk State, from 1979 to 1986.

In 1987, he was elected as a senator to the 5th Congress of the Federated States of Micronesia, and served in congress until he was elected vice president of the Federated States of Micronesia in 1999.

== Personal life ==
Killion has nine children.

Political offices
Preceded by Leo Falcam	Vice President of the Federated States of Micronesia; May 11, 1999 – May 11, 2007	Succeeded by Alik L. Alik
