= Petrus Tun =

Vice President of the Federated States of Micronesia (1935–1999)

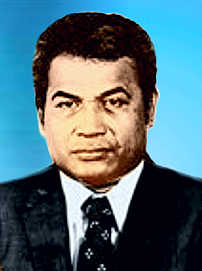

1st Vice President of the Federated States of Micronesia
- In office 1979–1983
- President: Tosiwo Nakayama
- Preceded by: Office created
- Succeeded by: Bailey Olter

2nd Governor of Yap
- In office January 12, 1987 – January 9, 1995
- Lieutenant: Tony Tawerilmang
- Preceded by: John Mangefel
- Succeeded by: Vincent A. Figir

Personal details
- Born: 18 March 1935 Yap State
- Died: 23 March 1999 (aged 64)
- Spouse: Carmen Mutnguy Tun

Petrus Tun (18 March 1935 – 23 March 1999) was a Micronesian politician, who played an important role during the first days of Micronesian independence and in the Trust Territory times that preceded them.

Tun was elected to the Senate of Micronesian Congress from Yap district. He was instrumental in negotiating the first Compact of Free Association between the FSM and the United States and later served as the first Vice President of the Federated States of Micronesia during the first term of President Tosiwo Nakayama (1979–1983).

After concluding his tenure as the nation's first vice-president, he served as special advisor to Yap's first Governor, John Mangefel, until he himself was voted as Yap's 2nd Governor of Yap. In addition, he held other high positions in both government and private industries. He would later be the Chairman of the FSM Delegation that negotiated the Amended Compact of Free Association with the United States that went into effect in 2004.

After his death a state funeral was held, attended by a large crowd including fellow Founding Fathers of the FSM, and he was buried in his Municipality of Gagil.
