= Jacob Nena =

Micronesian politician (1941–2022)

His Excellency Jacob Nena
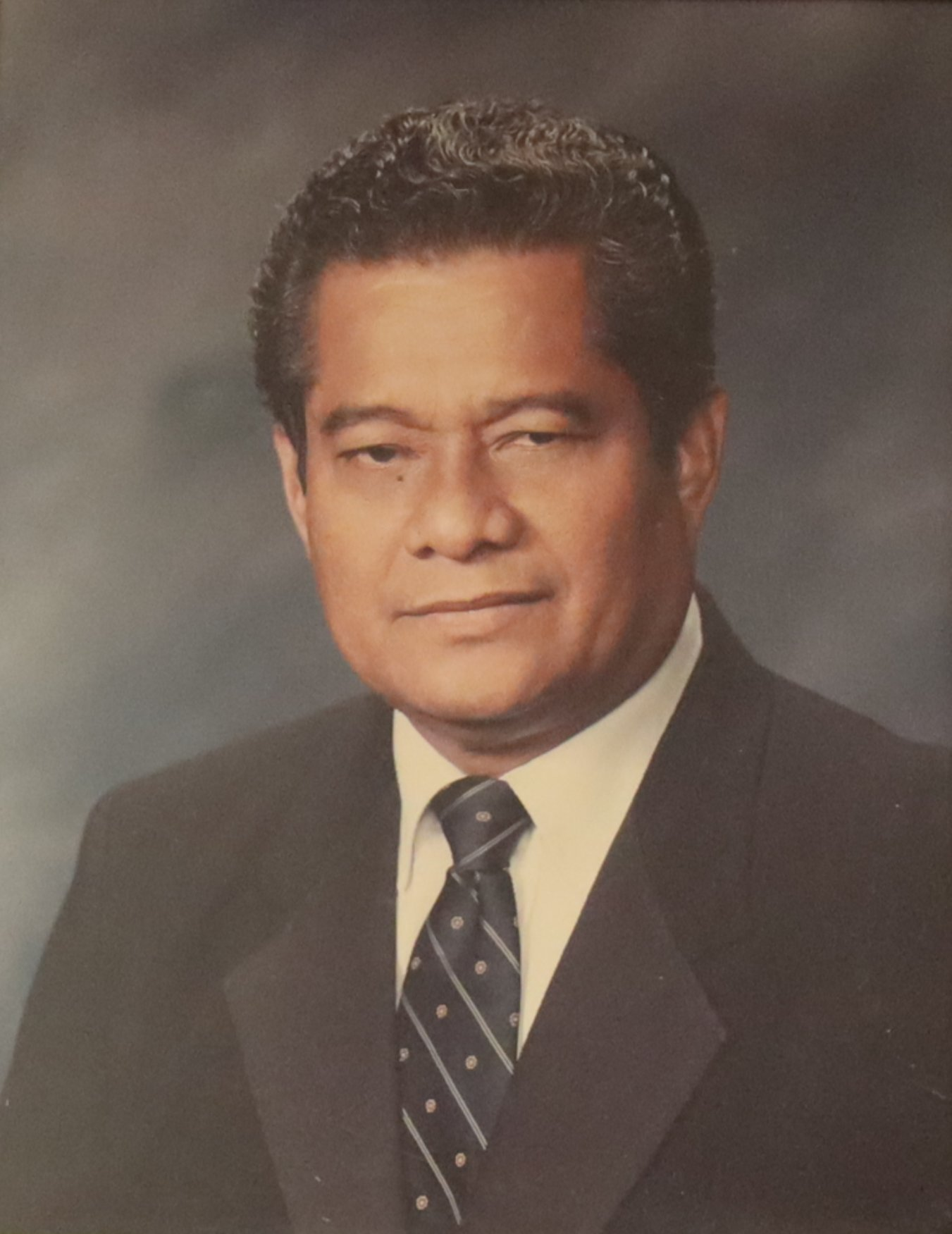

4th President of Micronesia
- In office 8 May 1997 – 11 May 1999; Acting: 8 November 1996 – 8 May 1997
- Vice President: Leo Falcam
- Preceded by: Bailey Olter
- Succeeded by: Leo Falcam

4th Vice President of Micronesia
- In office 11 May 1991 – 8 November 1996
- President: Bailey Olter
- Preceded by: Hiroshi Ismael
- Succeeded by: Leo Falcam

Governor of Kosrae
- In office 1 January 1979 – 3 January 1983
- Deputy: Yosiwo George; Kan Sigrah
- Preceded by: Position Established
- Succeeded by: Yosiwo George

Personal details
- Born: 10 October 1941 Lelu, South Seas Mandate
- Died: 6 July 2022 (aged 80) Sacramento, California, U.S.
- Party: Independent
- Spouse: Lerina Nena
- Education: University of Hawaiʻi at Mānoa

Jacob Nena (10 October 1941 – 6 July 2022) was a Micronesian politician who served as the fourth President of the Federated States of Micronesia from 1996 to 1999.

Nena was born in Lelu, Kosrae. He graduated with a BA from the College of Guam and later graduated with an MA degree from University of Hawaiʻi at Mānoa. He served as deputy district administrator of Kosrae from 1970 to 1977. He became the first elected Governor of Kosrae from 1979 to 1983.

Nena served as Vice President under Bailey Olter from 1991; after Olter suffered a stroke in July 1996, Nena took over as acting president on 8 November of that year and was sworn in as president on 8 May 1997, serving out the remaining two years of Olter's term. Nena died in Sacramento, California on 6 July 2022 at the age of 80.

Political offices
Preceded by Bailey Olter	President of the Federated States of Micronesia; 8 May 1997 – 1999	Succeeded by Leo Falcam
