= Leo Falcam =

Micronesian politician (1935–2018)

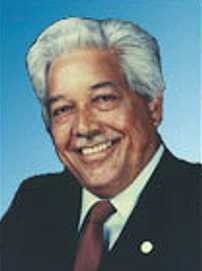

5th President of the Federated States of Micronesia
- In office May 11, 1999 – May 11, 2003
- Vice President: Redley A. Killion
- Preceded by: Jacob Nena
- Succeeded by: Joseph J. Urusemal

5th Vice President of the Federated States of Micronesia
- In office May 8, 1997 – May 11, 1999
- President: Jacob Nena
- Preceded by: Jacob Nena
- Succeeded by: Redley A. Killion

1st Governor of Pohnpei
- In office May 1, 1979 – May 1, 1983
- Lieutenant: Strik Yoma
- Preceded by: Office created
- Succeeded by: Resio Moses

Personal details
- Born: November 20, 1935 Pohnpei, South Seas Mandate, Empire of Japan
- Died: February 12, 2018 (aged 82)
- Spouse: Iris Falcam

Leo Amy Falcam (November 20, 1935 – February 12, 2018) was a Micronesian political figure. He was born in Pohnpei. He served as the first elected Governor of Pohnpei from 1979 to 1983 and as Vice President of Micronesia from May 1997 to May 1999. He then served as the fifth president of the Federated States of Micronesia, holding the position from May 11, 1999, to May 11, 2003. In March 2003 he lost his parliamentary seat during elections, denying him a chance at a second term.

Political offices
Preceded by Jacob Nena	President of the Federated States of Micronesia; 11 May 1999 – 11 May 2003	Succeeded by Joseph J. Urusemal
