= Hirosi Ismael =

Micronesian politician (1937–2008)

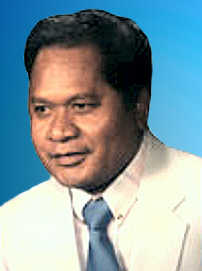

3rd Vice President of the Federated States of Micronesia
- In office May 11, 1987 – May 11, 1991
- Preceded by: Bailey Olter
- Succeeded by: Jacob Nena

Personal details
- Born: November 30, 1937 Kosrae
- Died: July 31, 2008 (aged 70) Kosrae; Federated States of Micronesia
- Spouse: Mitchigo Skilling

Hirosi Ismael (November 30, 1937 – July 31, 2008) was a Micronesian politician. Ismael served as the third Vice President of the Federated States of Micronesia from May 1987 until 1991.

He was born in 1937. Ismael was a native of Kosrae, but he grew up and attended school in Pohnpei. He served in a variety of top positions within the United Nations' Administration of the Trust Territory of the Pacific Islands before the FSM achieved its independence.

Ismael became the third Vice President of the Federated States of Micronesia (FSM) in May 1987, a position he held until 1991. He returned to his home state of Kosrae after leaving office, where he intended to retire from politics. Only after the request of some local politicians did he go back into politics, but only on an advisory position to the then-Governor of Kosrae. He would later be appointed as the director of the Health Department of Kosrae. He would also become a reverend serving in the church of Utwe. Upon being diagnosed with cancer, he travelled to the Philippines for treatment, though it was ineffective. He would eventually return to Kosrae to be with his family.

Hirosi Ismael died on July 31, 2008, at his home in Kosrae at the age of 71. He was survived by his wife, Mitchigo Skilling, as well as their children: Greeno, Grant, Loto, Paul, Kenye and Ruth.

The Micronesian Government released a statement honoring Ismael following his August 1, 2008, memorial service praising him for his service to the country: "Ismael's leadership, commitment and guidance during the nation's early efforts toward self-government earned him the respect of his colleagues and the people of the Federated States of Micronesia."

Political offices
Preceded by Bailey Olter	Vice President of the Federated States of Micronesia; May 1987 – 1991	Succeeded by Jacob Nena
