= Alik Alik =

Micronesian diplomat and politician

Alik L. Alik
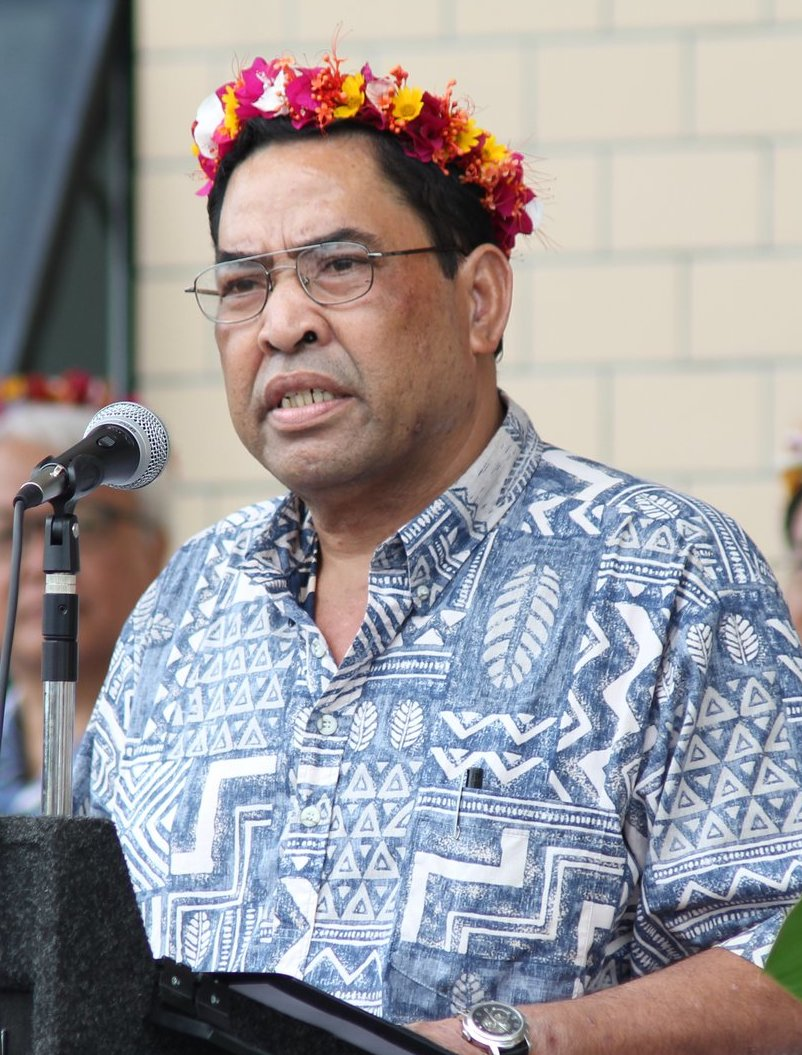
- Alik in 2011

7th Vice President of the Federated States of Micronesia
- In office May 11, 2007 – May 11, 2015
- President: Manny Mori
- Preceded by: Redley A. Killion
- Succeeded by: Yosiwo P. George

Personal details
- Born: 26 January 1953 (age 73) Kosrae, Micronesia
- Spouse: Shra C. Lonno

Alik L. Alik (born January 26, 1953) is a diplomat and politician from the Federated States of Micronesia who was the Vice President of the Federated States of Micronesia from May 11, 2007 to May 11, 2015.

Born in Kosrae, Micronesia, Alik completed high school in 1973 and then left the island for education in the United States, attending United States International University in Hawaii from 1973 to 1976 and Graceland College in Iowa from 1976 to 1979. After returning to Kosrae, Alik worked as a student counselor at the Kosrae High School for two years.

In 1982, Alik became a Foreign Service Officer for the FSM Department of External Affairs and promoted to Deputy Chief for the Division of South Pacific Affairs.

In 1989, Alik became first Micronesian ambassador to Fiji, serving until 1998. While in Fiji, Alik was also a cross-accredited as FSM's Ambassador to Israel, Tonga, Nauru, Kiribati, Samoa, Tuvalu, Solomon Islands, and Vanuatu. In 1998, he was appointed ambassador to Japan.

In 2003, Alik won Kosrae State's at-large representative election to the 13th FSM Congress. In the 13th Congress, he held chairmanship for the Committee on Resource and Development with membership on the Committees of Judiciary & Governmental Operations and also External Affairs. In the 14th Congress, he assumed chairmanship of the Foreign Affairs Committee.

Alik was the second FSM diplomatic envoy to Israel, following Ambassador Jesse B. Marehalau, since the two countries formalized their relations on 23 November 1988.

Alik became the 7th Vice President of the Federated States of Micronesia on May 11, 2007.

Alik is married to former Shra C. Lonno. They have two children together.
