= Bailey Olter =

President of Federated States of Micronesia (1933–1999)

His Excellency Bailey Olter
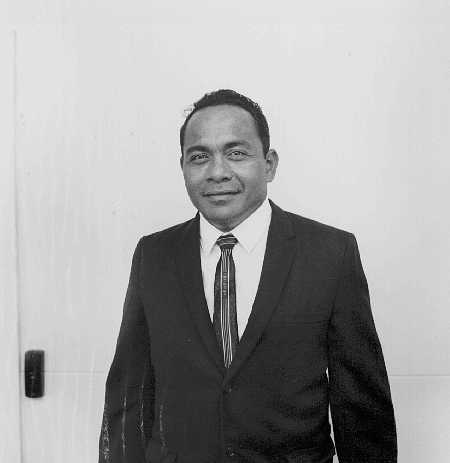
- Olter in 1960

3rd President of the Federated States of Micronesia
- In office May 11, 1991 – November 8, 1996
- Vice President: Jacob Nena
- Preceded by: John Haglelgam
- Succeeded by: Jacob Nena

2nd Vice President of the Federated States of Micronesia
- In office May 11, 1983 – May 11, 1987
- President: Tosiwo Nakayama
- Preceded by: Petrus Tun
- Succeeded by: Hiroshi Ismael

Personal details
- Born: March 27, 1932 Mokil Atoll, Pohnpei, South Seas Mandate, Empire of Japan
- Died: February 16, 1999 (aged 66) Kolonia, Pohnpei
- Spouse: Amalia Nanpei Olter
- Children: 6
- Education: University of Hawaiʻi (BA)

Bailey Olter (March 27, 1932 – February 16, 1999) was a Micronesian politician who served as the 3rd President of the Federated States of Micronesia from 1991 to 1996. Prior to his presidency he served as the 2nd Vice President of the Federated States of Micronesia under President Tosiwo Nakayama from 1983 to 1987.

== Early life ==
Baily Olter was born in Mokil Atoll, South Seas Mandate, on March 27, 1932. He graduated from the University of Hawaiʻi with a Bachelor of Arts degree in political science.

== Career ==
The Congress of Micronesia held its first elections in 1965. For the selection of president, John Ngiraked initially led with 5 votes followed by Olter with 4 and Tosiwo Nakayama with 2. Olter did not pursue the presidency and Nakayama was elected president.

Olter was hesitant on self-determination for Micronesia due to its level of development.

Petrus Tun declined to seek reelection to the Congress of the Federated States of Micronesia and to the vice presidency in 1983. Olter was selected to serve as vice president under Nakayama.

Olter ran for reelection to Congress in 1987, but lost to Leo Falcam for the at-large seat from Pohnpei by 15 votes. Olter was considered the front-runner for the presidency, but his defeat left room for John Haglelgam to be elected.

=== Presidency ===
Olter was elected president of the Federated States of Micronesia in 1991, with Jacob Nena as his vice president. They were sworn in by Chief Justice Edward C. King.

Li Quinping, the first Chinese ambassador to Micronesia, presented his credentials to Olter on June 26, 1991. Micronesia established diplomatic ties with Indonesia on July 16, 1991, the Maldives on October 24, 1991, and Brunei on February 23, 1992.

Micronesia was granted full member in the World Health Organization on May 8, 1991, and it was admitted to the United Nations (UN) on September 17. Olter gave his first address to the UN on September 23.

== Personal life ==
Olter married Amalia Nanpei Olter, with whom he had six children. He died in Kolonia on February 16, 1999. He was given a state funeral on February 22.

== Works cited ==
=== Books ===
- Hanlon, David (2014). Making Micronesia: A Political Biography of Tosiwo Nakayama. University of Hawaiʻi Press. ISBN 9780824838461.

=== Journals ===
- Ballendorf, Dirk (1992). "The Federated States of Micronesia - Up-Date 1991-92". The Journal of Pacific History. 27 (3). Taylor & Francis: 73–76. doi:10.2307/25169147. JSTOR 25169147.

=== Web ===
- "Former Presidents". Government of the Federated States of Micronesia. Archived from the original on 14 April 2008.
- "Third FSM President Bailey Olter Dies". University of Hawaiʻi at Mānoa. February 17, 1999. Archived from the original on August 30, 2014.

Political offices
Preceded by John Haglelgam	President of the Federated States of Micronesia; 1991–1996	Succeeded by Jacob Nena
