= John Haglelgam =

Micronesian politician (1949–2024)

His Excellency John Haglelgam
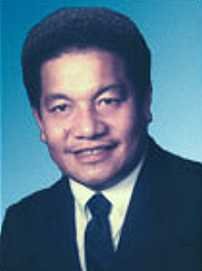

2nd President of the Federated States of Micronesia
- In office May 11, 1987 – May 11, 1991
- Vice President: Hirosi Ismael
- Preceded by: Tosiwo Nakayama
- Succeeded by: Bailey Olter

Personal details
- Born: August 10, 1949 Eauripik, Yap, Trust Territory of the Pacific Islands
- Died: September 12, 2024 (aged 75) Honolulu, Hawaii, U.S.
- Spouse: Paula Ori
- Children: 3

John Richard Haglelgam (August 10, 1949 – September 12, 2024) was a Micronesian politician who served as the second President of the Federated States of Micronesia.

== Background and early life ==
Haglelgam was born on August 10, 1949, on the island of Eauripik in Yap State. He attended Eauripik Elementary School and the Outer Islands High School on Ulithi, Yap from 1964 to 1968. In 1968, he received an AFS scholarship to spend his senior year at Beaverton High School in Beaverton, Oregon. After graduating from Beaverton High School in 1969, Mr. Haglelgam enrolled at the University of Hawaii where he received a Bachelor of Arts degree in Political Science in 1973. He attended Willamette University College of Law in Salem, Oregon, for one year and returned home to run for a seat in the Congress of Micronesia House of Representatives to represent the Outer Islands of Yap. After serving a term in the House of Representatives, Haglelgam returned to the University of Hawaii at Manoa as a graduate student sponsored by the East West Center. Haglelgam was at the University of Hawaii when he was re-elected to a second term in the House of Representatives. He received a Master of Arts degree in Political Science in the spring of 1977. One year after his unsuccessful bid for reelection in 1991, Mr. Haglelgam attended Harvard’s Kennedy School where he received a master's degree in Public Administration (MPA) in 1993.

Haglelgam began his sixteen years of service to the people of Micronesia in 1974 when he successfully ran for a seat in the House of Representatives of the Congress of Micronesia. Mr. Haglelgam was a member of the House of Representatives until the ratification of the FSM Constitution in 1978. He was a member of the Interim Congress until the election for members of the First Congress of the Federated States of Micronesia in 1979. After the late Petrus Tun’s election to the FSM vice presidency, Mr. Haglelgam ran successfully as a write-in candidate for the vacant Yap’s at-large seat in the FSM Congress. Haglelgam served two terms in the FSM Congress. During his last term, he served as the floor leader.

== President of the Federated States of Micronesia ==
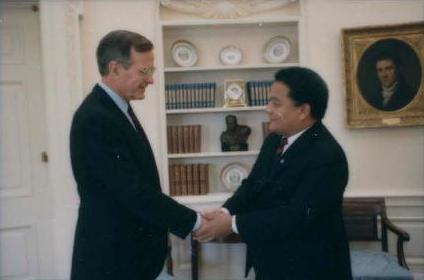
Haglelgam greeting President George H. W. Bush in 1990

On May 12, 1987, the Fifth FSM Congress elected Haglelgam as the second president of the Federated States of Micronesia to succeed the late Tosiwo Nakayama.

Haglelgam also served as Chairman of the FSM Delegation to the United Nations Law of the Sea Conference. He attended many meetings of the Conference on behalf the Federated States of Micronesia. He served as a staff member of the Micronesian Constitutional Convention in 1977. In 1981, he served as the Vice President of the Yap State Constitutional Convention.

== Academia ==
After his unsuccessful reelection bid in 1991, Haglelgam became an instructor in the Division of Social Science at the national campus of the College of Micronesia-FSM. In February 1992, the Board of Regents of the College appointed him as Regent Professor. In the summer of 1992, Haglelgam took an educational leave from the college to attend the John Fitzgerald Kennedy School of Government at Harvard University as a Mason Fellow. At the College of Micronesia-FSM, Haglelgam taught government and politics, Micronesian history, world history, and East Asian history. During the fall semester of 1995, Haglelgam taught at MARC at the University of Guam as a visiting professor. In 1997, he spent three months at the Australian National University as the Distinguish Senior Pacific Scholar.

== Other activities ==
Haglelgam served as the president of the 3rd FSM Constitutional Convention in 2001.

In August 2018, Haglelgam spoke out against the Chuukese independence movement prior to the referendum scheduled for 2019. He described proponents of independence as "clinical crazy people".

== Personal life and death ==
Haglelgam was married to Paula Ori from Uman Island in Chuuk Lagoon. They had two sons, William Haglelgam (deceased) and John Paul Ori and one daughter, Tess P. Haglelgam. He was an active member of the Harvard Alumni Association (HAA) and the East-West Center Association.

Haglelgam died in Honolulu, Hawaii on September 12, 2024, at the age of 75.

== Sources ==
- Official biography

Political offices
| Preceded by Tosiwo Nakayama | President of the Federated States of Micronesia; 1987–1991 | Succeeded by Bailey Olter |
