= Manny Mori =

President of Micronesia from 2007 to 2015

His Excellency Emanuel Mori
- エマニュエル・マニー・モリ
- Mori in 2008

7th President of Micronesia
- In office 11 May 2007 – 11 May 2015
- Vice President: Alik Alik
- Preceded by: Joseph Urusemal
- Succeeded by: Peter Christian

Member of the Congress of Micronesia
- In office 1 July 1999 – 11 May 2007
- Constituency: Chuuk State’s at-large district

Personal details
- Born: 25 December 1949 (age 76) Fefan, Pacific Islands
- Party: Independent
- Spouse: Emma Mori
- Education: University of Guam (B.A.)
- Mori's voice Mori speaking at the opening ceremony of the Connect Asia-Pacific 2013 Summit; Recorded November 20, 2013

Emanuel "Manny" Mori (born December 25, 1949) is a Micronesian politician who served as President of the Federated States of Micronesia from 11 May 2007 to 11 May 2015.

== Early life ==
Mori was born on the island of Fefan and attended and graduated from Xavier High School. Following his graduation in 1969, Mori went to the University of Guam. Mori proceeded to graduate in 1973 with a BA in Business Management.

== Career ==
=== Professional ===
After completing his university education, Mori was chosen for a management internship at Citicorp Credit-Guam. In 1974, he became the Assistant Manager at the Citicorp branch in Saipan. Mori left Citicorp in 1976 after he accepted the position of Assistant Administrator of the Trust Territory Social Security Office. In 1979, he became the National Revenue Officer for the State of Chuuk, administering the Tax & Revenue Office. He then served as the Comptroller of the FSM Development Bank from 1981 until 1983 and subsequently as the President and CEO until 1997. Finally, he was the Executive Vice President of the Bank of the Federated States of Micronesia from 1997 until his 1999 election to Congress.

=== Politics ===
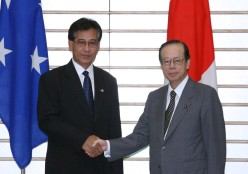
with Yasuo Fukuda (at the Prime Minister's Official Residence on November 30, 2007)

Mori was first elected to the FSM Congress in a special election for Chuuk State’s at-large held on July 1, 1999. He was subsequently re-elected in 2001, 2003, 2005 and 2007.

In 2003, President Mori went on a hiatus from politics and accepted the position of General Manager and Chief Executive Officer for the ailing Chuuk Public Utilities Corporation. Under his management, the Corporation undertook and successfully executed measures of progressive reform which include the restoration of 24-hour power services to Weno, the capital island of Chuuk State. The following year, President Mori re-entered the political arena as his home state’s four year or at-large representative to the 13th FSM Congress. In that Congress he served as Vice Chairman of the Committee on External Affairs with membership on the other committees.

During the reorganization of the 14th FSM Congress in 2005, President Mori became the Chairman of the Committee on Resources and Development with membership on the other committees.

On May 11, 2007, Mori was elected President of the Federated States of Micronesia, defeating the incumbent, Joseph Urusemal. He took office with immediate effect and thus vacated his seat in the Congress. As president, Mori brought environmental concerns and impacts in the four island states to the forefront of global discussions.

== Family and personal life ==
Genealogical records showed that Mori is the great-grandson of Koben Mori. A native of Shikoku, Japan and the son of a samurai, Koben Mori was among the first Japanese to settle in Micronesia. Koben Mori first established himself in Moen, Chuuk but later resettled in Tol. He married the daughter of a local chieftain from Weno, with whom he had six sons and five daughters. Koben Mori's eldest son Taro is the paternal grandfather of Manny Mori.

During his tenure as president, Mori made an official visit to his ancestral homeland in Kochi prefecture in 2008 to commemorate the 20th anniversary of bilateral relations between Japan and the Federated States of Micronesia. He received a warm welcome from the governor and mayor. Mori also paid respects to his ancestor, the primogenitor of the Mori clan, Mori Katsunobu. (Note: Mori Katsunobu was a 16th-century daimyō who ruled over parts of Shikoku and Kyushu under the direction of Toyotomi Hideyoshi.)

Mori has four daughters from his first wife Elina Ekiek. He is remarried to Emma Mori.

== See also ==
- List of state leaders

== Footnotes ==
Political offices
| Preceded by Joseph Urusemal | President of Micronesia; 2007–2015 | Succeeded by Peter Christian |
