= Joseph Urusemal =

Micronesian politician (1951–2025)

His Excellency Joseph J. Urusemal
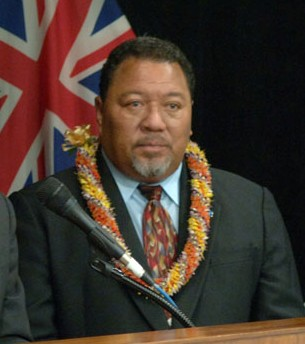
- Uresmal in 2006

6th President of the Federated States of Micronesia
- In office May 11, 2003 – May 11, 2007
- Vice President: Redley A. Killion
- Preceded by: Leo Falcam
- Succeeded by: Manny Mori

Personal details
- Born: March 19, 1952 Woleai, Yap, Trust Territory of the Pacific Islands
- Died: September 16, 2025 (aged 73) Palau
- Spouse: Olania Latileilam

Joseph John Urusemal (March 19, 1952 – September 16, 2025) was a Micronesian politician who served as the sixth President of the Federated States of Micronesia from 2003 until 2007.

== Early life ==
Urusemal was born on the island of Woleai in the State of Yap on March 19, 1952. He attended secondary school on the island of Truk at Xavier High School, a Jesuit institution. He graduated in 1976.

Urusemal graduated with a Bachelor of Arts degree from Rockhurst College in Kansas City, Missouri, United States. Upon graduation, he accepted a position with the Jackson County, Missouri, government, including the county Department of Corrections until he returned to Micronesia in 1982.

Following his return to Micronesia, Urusemal became a teacher and guidance counselor for the Outer Islands High School on his native Yap.

== Political career ==
Urusemal was elected to four-year term in the Fifth Congress of the Federated States of Micronesia in 1987. He was elected as Yap's at-large representative. Urusemal rose to leadership positions during his parliamentary career. He served as Floor Leader for twelve years during the Seventh until the Twelfth FSM congresses.

During his political career representing Yap, Urusemal served on several congressional committees including Health, Education and Social Affairs and the Judiciary and Governmental Operations committees.

The president and vice president of the Federated States of Micronesia are elected directly by Congress and must be a duly elected member at the time of election. Due to the defeat of the then-incumbent president, Leo Falcam, in the previous elections, Falcam was unable to stand for re-election. On May 11, 2003, Congress elected Urusemal as President and he took office immediately.

On May 11, 2007, the 15th Congress convened. A new presidential election was held and Manny Mori was elected president. He likewise took office immediately.

== Personal life ==
Urusemal was married to former First Lady Olania Latileilam, who is from Satawal. The couple had four children: B.J., Tarsis, Craig and Elenita.

== Death ==
Urusemal died in Palau on September 16, 2025, at the age of 73.

Political offices
Preceded by Leo Falcam	President of the Federated States of Micronesia; May 11, 2003 – May 11, 2007	Succeeded by Manny Mori
