= Tosiwo Nakayama =

First President of the Federated States of Micronesia (1931 - 2007)

His Excellency Tosiwo Nakayama
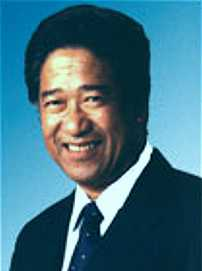

1st President of Micronesia
- In office 11 May 1979 – 11 May 1987
- Vice President: Petrus Tun (1979–1983); Bailey Olter (1983–1987)
- Preceded by: Position Established
- Succeeded by: John Haglelgam

President of Senate of Micronesian Congress
- In office July 1965 – 1967
- Preceded by: John O. Ngiraked
- Succeeded by: John O. Ngiraked
- In office Jan 1973 – May 1979
- Preceded by: Amata Kabua
- Succeeded by: Position abolished

Personal details
- Born: 23 November 1931 Piherarh, Truk, South Seas Mandate
- Died: 29 March 2007 (aged 75) Honolulu, Hawaii
- Party: Independent
- Spouse: Miter Haruo

Tosiwo Nakayama (中山 利雄, Nakayama Toshio; November 23, 1931 – March 29, 2007) was the first President of the Federated States of Micronesia (FSM). He served two terms from 1979 until 1987.

== Biography ==
Nakayama was born on November 23, 1931, on Piherarh, part of Namonuito Atoll in what is now Chuuk State. At the time of his birth it formed part of the Japanese-administered South Seas Mandate. He had a Japanese father and a native mother. and was the older brother of FSM's ambassador to Japan, Masao Nakayama.

In 1955 he was awarded a Trust Territory Scholarship that allowed him to study for two years at University High School and for two years at the University of Hawaii. Upon his return in 1958 from his formal education experience he was appointed as the Supervisor of Adult Education. He was later appointed as the Political and Economic Advisor to the District Administration. Later he served his people in the Truk District Legislature and was President of that assembly from 1960 to 1961.

After his term in Truk, he was appointed the Micronesian Advisor to the United States Delegation to the United Nations Trusteeship Council after which he returned to Micronesia by way of Europe and Asia. In 1962 he was elected by the people to the Council of Micronesia and served there until 1963. In the following year, he was appointed the Assistant District Administrator for Public Affairs - Truk. On September 10, 1963, he married Miter Haruo in Chuuk.

In 1965 he was elected to the House of Delegates of the Congress of Micronesia. During the organizational meeting of that body, he was again elected President of the Senate. He also served as a member of the Truk District Scholarship Committee, the Truk Review Advisory Board, the Truk District Recreational Committee, the Truk Board of Education, as well as many other boards and committees.

In May 1979, statehood was declared for Yap, Chuuk, Pohnpei, and Kosrae as the Federated State of Micronesia, and an elected Congress was seated. From their number, Nakayama was elected President of the new nation.

He oversaw the orderly transfer of governmental functions from the United States of America from 1979 to 1986 and served on until 1987, his maximum constitutionally allowable term. In October 1987 he took a position with the Bank of Guam, Chuuk Branch as the Vice President for Governmental Affairs, a position he held until December 2003.

His health began to fail in 1992 when he had his first stroke from which he recovered well. In 1998 he had quintuple bypass surgery. Sometime later he had laser surgery on one of his eyes which left him partially blind. In the summer of 2005, he underwent surgery for a pacemaker in order to stimulate his weak heart. Three days after that surgery he had an additional stroke that left him paralyzed and unable to speak though he was completely cognizant. The 14th Congress of the FSM passed a bill in July 2006 that allocated money to help the family with mounting medical bills. In February 2007 he was admitted in the hospital in Honolulu, Hawaii. He subsequently died on 29 March.

Political offices
Preceded by New office	President of the Federated States of Micronesia; 1979 – 1987	Succeeded by John Haglelgam
