= History of the Federated States of Micronesia =

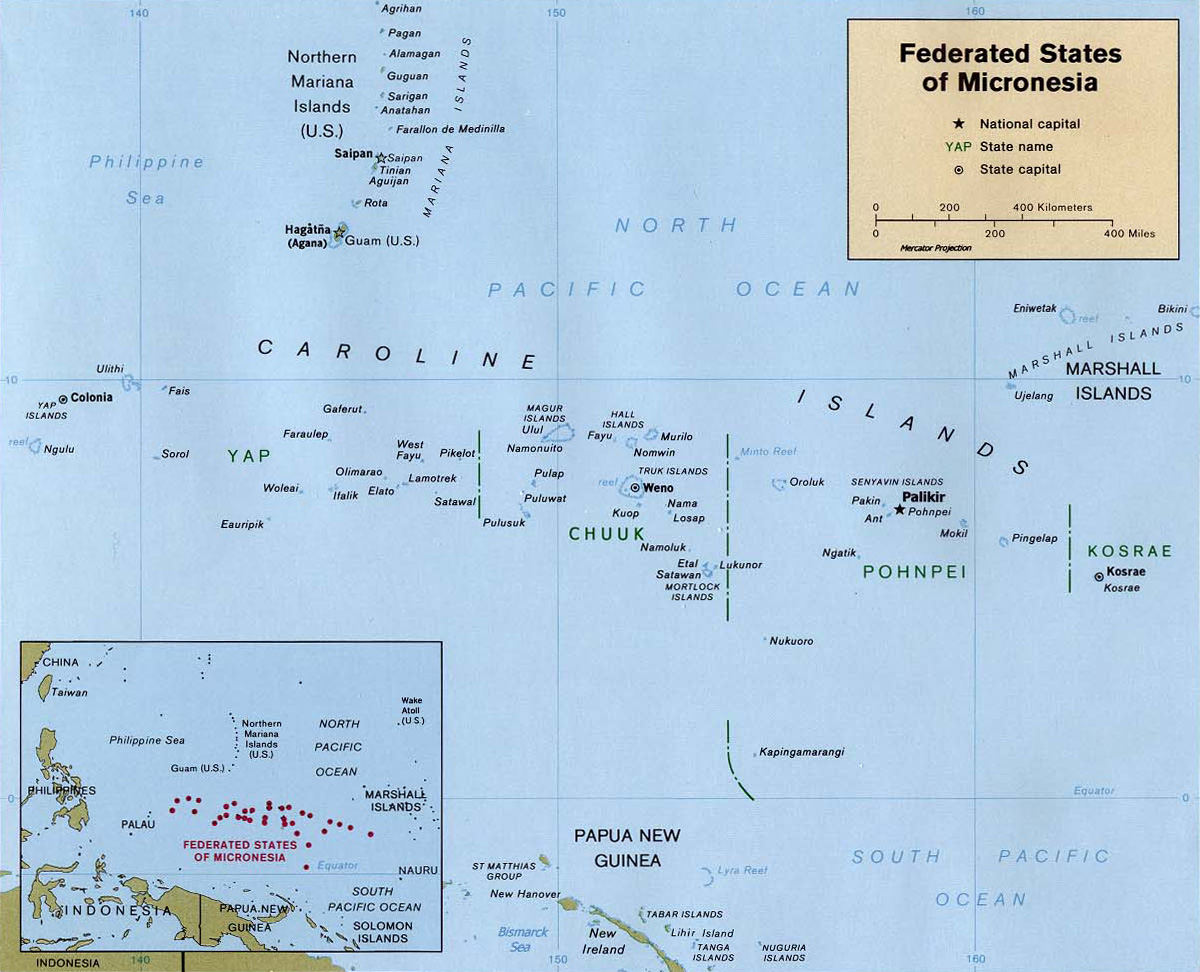
A map of the Federated States of Micronesia

The Federated States of Micronesia are located on the Caroline Islands in the western Pacific Ocean. The history of the modern Federated States of Micronesia is one of settlement by Micronesians; colonization by Spain, Germany, and Japan; United Nations trusteeship under United States-administered Trust Territory of the Pacific Islands; and gradual independence beginning with the ratification of a sovereign constitution in 1979.

== Pre-colonial history ==
The Austronesian ancestors of the Micronesians settled there over 4,000 years ago. A decentralized chieftain-based system eventually evolved into a more centralized economic and religious culture centered on Pohnpei. People from the Caroline Islands had regular contact with the Chamorro people of the Marianas Islands, as well as rarer voyages into the eastern islands of the Philippines.

=== Yap and the Yapese Empire ===
==== Yapese Empire ====
From circa 1500 BC, before the beginning of foreign colonial administration by Western powers, the island of Yap created and maintained a unique set of socio-economic and political relationships with neighbouring islands to its east and southwest in what is known as the Yapese Empire. Although small-scale and informal, the Empire per se was formed when what is now known as Gagil Municipality through the chief village of Gatchaper, developed and maintained a maritime trade and political network with smaller atolls and island groups between Yap and Chuuk, covering over approximately 1,500 kilometres (932.01 miles) of the western Pacific.

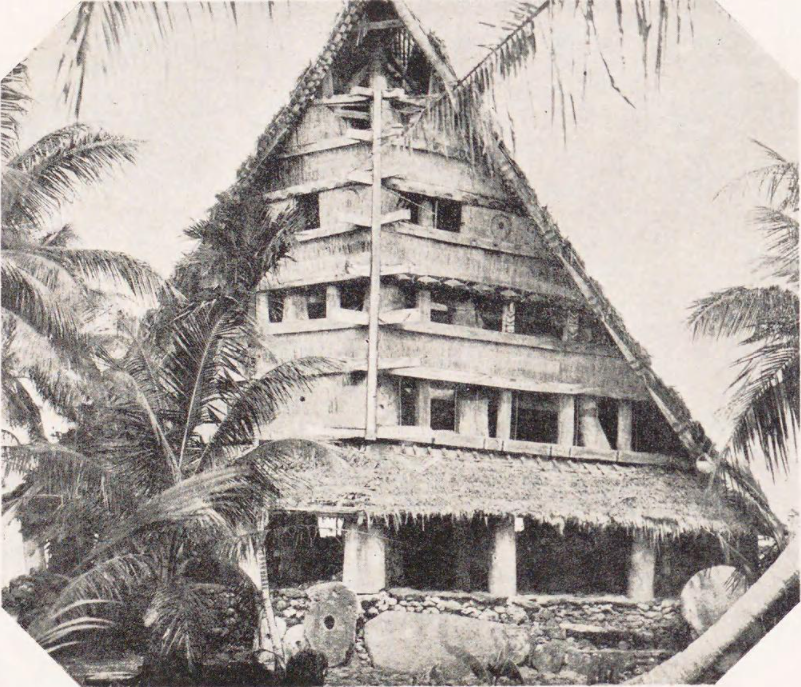
Village assembly hall, also known as pe'ebaey, at Yap Island in 1932

Through a relationship known as sawey, the Empire demanded tribute known as Pitigil Tamol to be given to the paramount chief of Gagil in Gatchaper. These tributes would include bagiiy (lavalava), coconut rope, coconut oil, mats and shells. In return, Gagil would reciprocate with mutual support from the main island in case of natural emergencies as well as goods. These goods from Gagil would include Yapese canoes, turmeric, flint stone and other Yapese resources. The relationship also asked those with navigational experience and expertise for service along with Yapese navigators. This relationship may have helped the Yapese sail to Palau for quarrying the Rai stones, the stone currency disks carved from crystalline calcite still used today in cultural transactions.

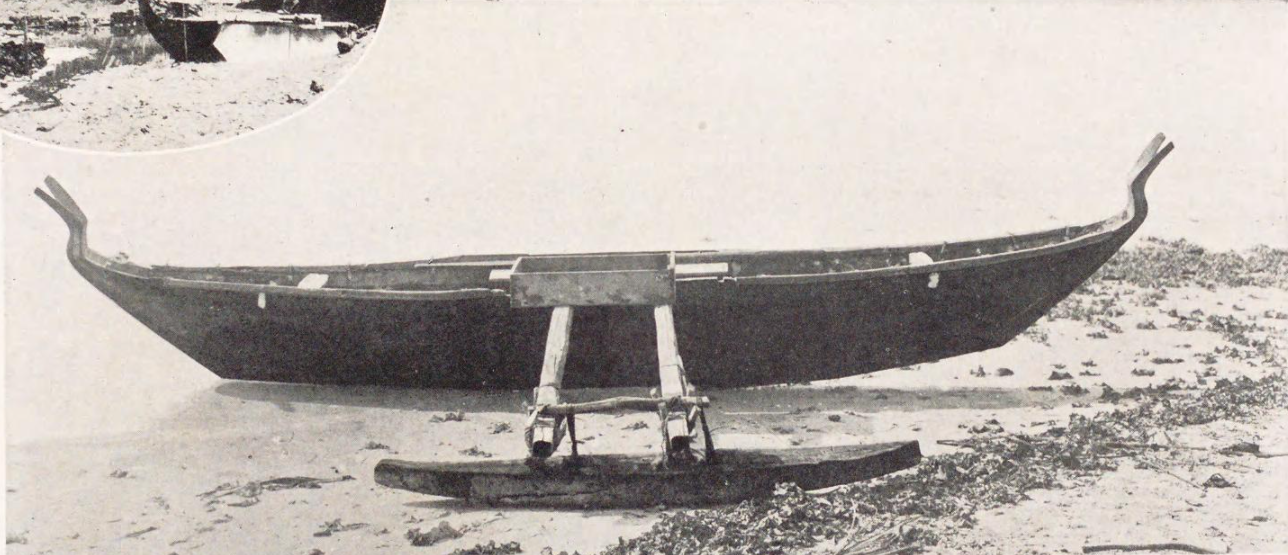
Traditional Yapese canoe, or muw

Although this unique relationship with Gagil and the outer islands may appear exploitative, researchers such as Lessa (1950, pp. 43, 52; 1986, p. 35) and Lingenfelter (p. 147) maintain that the relationship was mostly mutual and, in most cases, was more beneficial to the Carolinians than to the Yapese. Lessa (1950, p. 70-71) had also suggested that the so-called empire was formed out of conquest and "blackmail" through sorcery and economics.

Other places mentioned in Pacific anthropological-historical literature that were quite similar to the Yapese Empire was the Tongan Empire, also known as Tu'i Tonga, which is now present-day Kingdom of Tonga.

==== Yapese traditional society: feudalism and the social caste system ====
Yapese traditional society before foreign colonial administrations was divided into multiple villages and municipalities and is highly feudal in nature. Power was not allocated to one single authority that controlled Yap but was decentralised and allocated to at least ten municipalities. A defining feature of Yapese society was its unique and complex social caste system, which is still in use today. Each of the current one-hundred twenty-nine (129) villages of Yap are organised into single units based on the class system depicted below.

HIGH CLASSES: TABUGUL ("PURE")
CLASSES/CASTES
Bulche'/ 'Ulun	Chiefs
Methibaan/Tethibaan	Nobles
Daworchig	Commoners

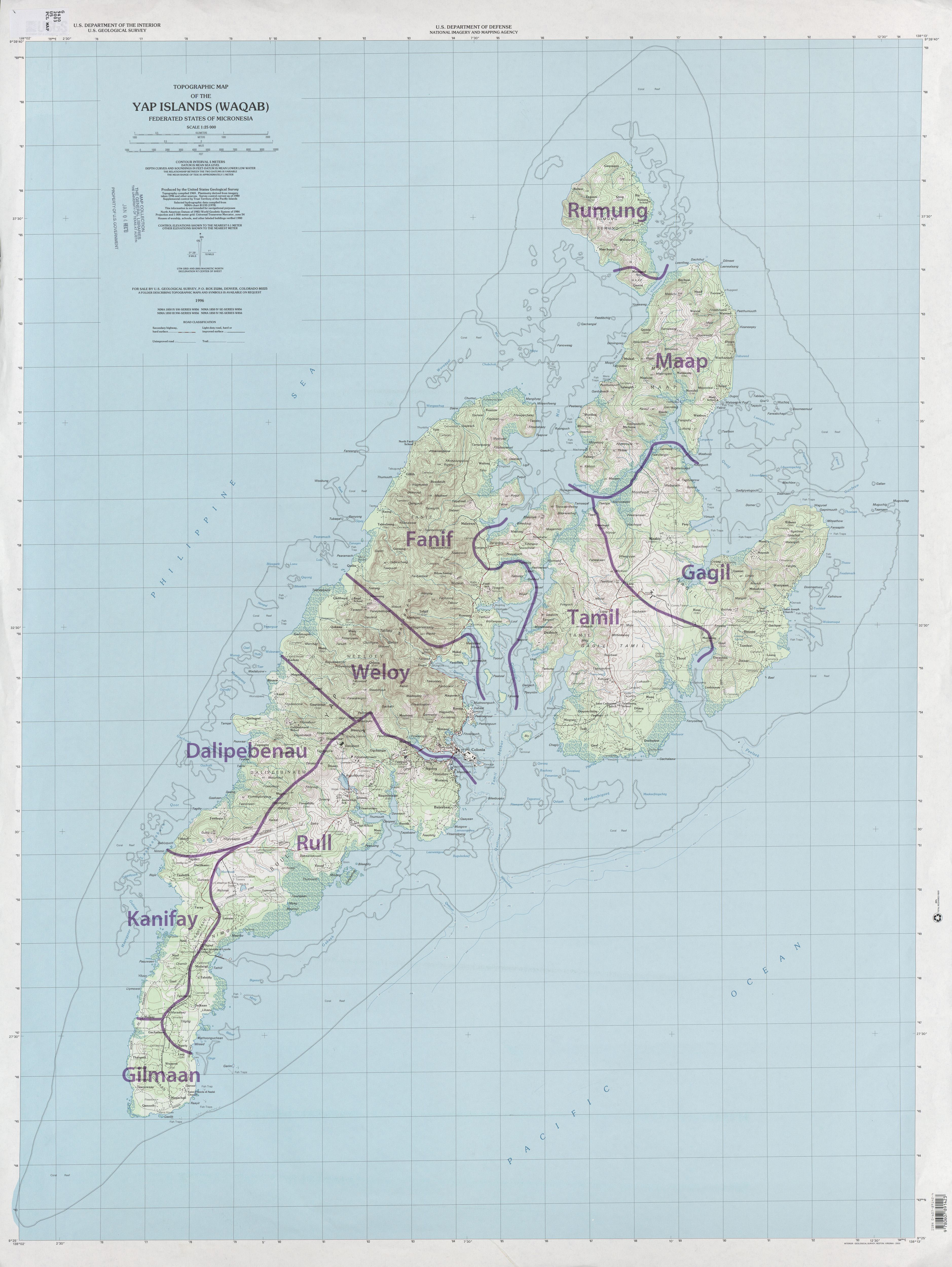
Detailed map of the municipalities of Yap Island

LOW CLASSES: TA'AY ("IMPURE")
CLASSES/CASTES
Milingaay ni 'Arow	Servants
Milingaay	Serfs
Yagug/Milignaay ni Kaan	Serfs

Although each village has its own class ranking within the municipality based on the number of military victories, each village also has its own internal set of social classes exclusive to that group. All low classes and low-class villages were under the authority of villages that were ranked higher since the latter had considerable power and voice (lungun). An example of a high-ranking village is the aforementioned Gatchaper, which is ranked Bulche' or 'UIun. Because villages and municipalities were continuously at war amongst one another, village and personal social ranks fluctuated based on military outcomes.

However, in the 20th century, during the German occupation of Yap, the German administration pacified the island and enforced strict prohibition against violent conflicts. This policy resulted in a permanent freeze of all social caste rankings. Today, there are three villages with the high-ranking chief villages: Teb Village in Tamil Municipality, Ngolog Village in Rull Municipality and Gatchaper in Gagil Municipality.

These chief villages and their municipalities are referred to in Yapese as "fare dalip e nguchol", which means "the three cooking stones". This similarity was created to describe the relationship between these three villages and municipalities with the other remaining seven. The stones, or nguchol, represent Tamil, Gagil and Rull while the pot represents the island of Yap. The saying goes that when one stone, or one municipality or village, fell, all of Yap and its value would fall as well.

=== Pohnpei and Saudeleur rule ===
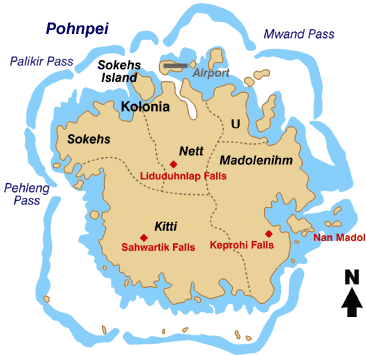
Municipality map of modern Pohnpei; under Saudeleur rule, there were only three first-level divisions.

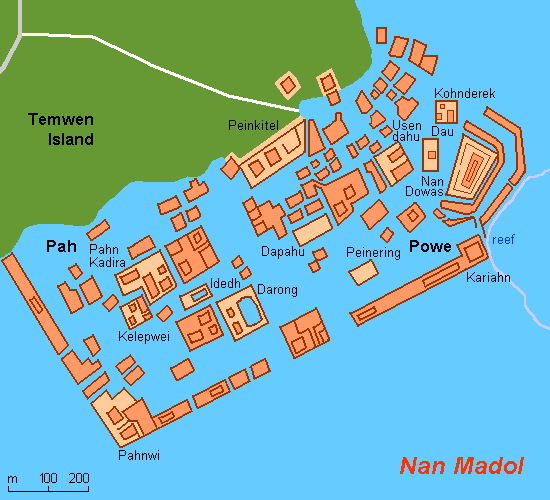
Central Nan Madol

On Pohnpei, pre-colonial history is divided into three eras: Mwehin Kawa or Mwehin Aramas (Period of Building, or Period of Peopling, before c. 1100); Mwehin Sau Deleur (Period of the Lord of Deleur, c. 1100 to c. 1628); (Note: The Saudeleur era lasted around 500 years. Legend generally dates their downfall to the 1500s, however archaeologists date Saudeleur ruins to c. 1628.) and Mwehin Nahnmwarki (Period of the Nahnmwarki, c. 1628 to c. 1885). Pohnpeian legend recounts that the Saudeleur rulers, the first to bring government to Pohnpei, were of foreign origin. The Saudeleur centralized form of absolute rule is characterized in Pohnpeian legend as becoming increasingly oppressive over several generations. Arbitrary and onerous demands, as well as a reputation for offending Pohnpeian deities, sowed resentment among Pohnpeians. The Saudeleur Dynasty ended with the invasion of Isokelekel, another semi-mythical foreigner, who replaced the Saudeleur rule with the more decentralized nahnmwarki system in existence today. Isokelekel is regarded as the creator of the modern Pohnpeian nahnmwarki social system and the father of the Pohnpeian people.

Nan Madol offshore of Temwen Island near Pohnpei, consists of a series of small artificial islands linked by a network of canals, and is often called the Venice of the Pacific. It is located near the island of Pohnpei and was the ceremonial and political seat of the Saudeleur Dynasty that united Pohnpei's estimated 25,000 people until its centralized system collapsed amid the invasion of Isokelekel. Isokelekel and his descendants initially occupied the stone city, but later abandoned it.

== European colonisation ==
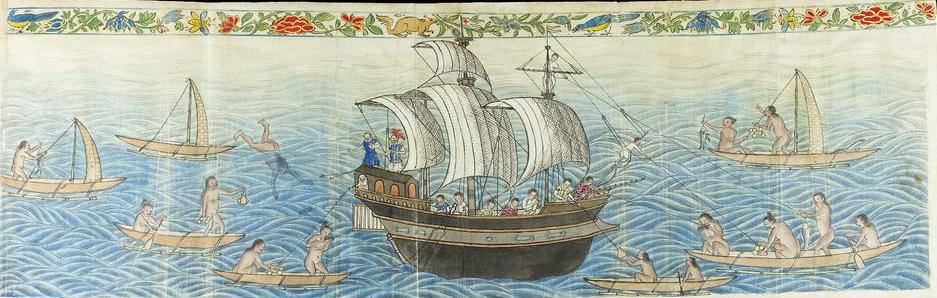
Manila Galleon in the Marianas and Carolinas, c. 1590 Boxer Codex

European explorers - first the Portuguese in search of the Spice Islands (Indonesia) and then the Spanish - reached the Carolines in the 16th century, with the Spanish establishing sovereignty.

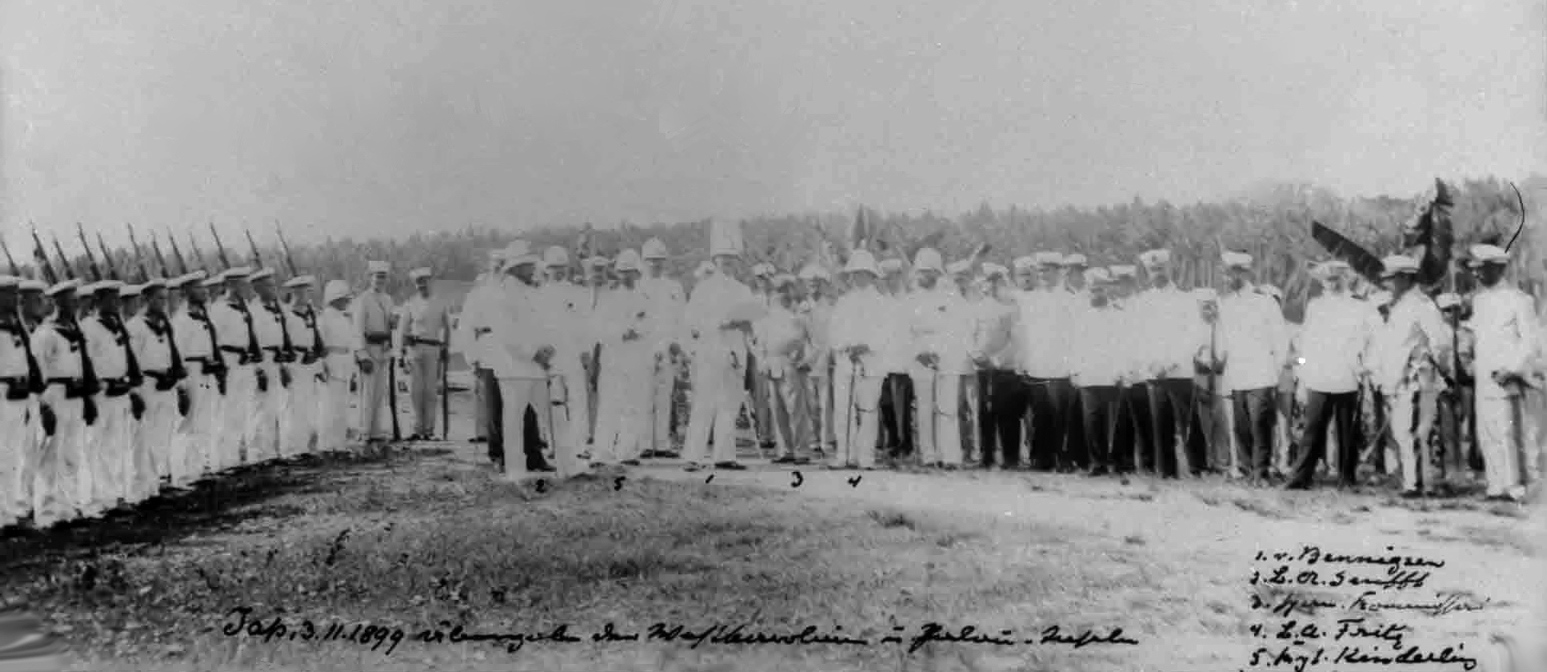
Handover Ceremony of the Western Caroline Islands and Palau by Spain to the German Empire on the island of Yap, 3 November 1899

Spain sold the islands to Germany in 1899 under the terms of the German–Spanish Treaty of that year. Germany placed them under the jurisdiction of German New Guinea. German efforts to reorganize the traditional social hierarchy and recruit forced labor for construction resulted in a rebellion by inhabitants of Sokehs Municipality in 1910.

Yap was a major German naval communications center before the First World War and an important international hub for cable telegraphy. It was occupied by Japanese troops in September, 1914, and passed to the Japanese Empire under the Versailles Treaty in 1919 as a mandated territory under League of Nations supervision. US commercial rights on the island were secured by a special US-Japanese treaty to that effect, concluded on February 11, 1922.

== Empire of Japan ==
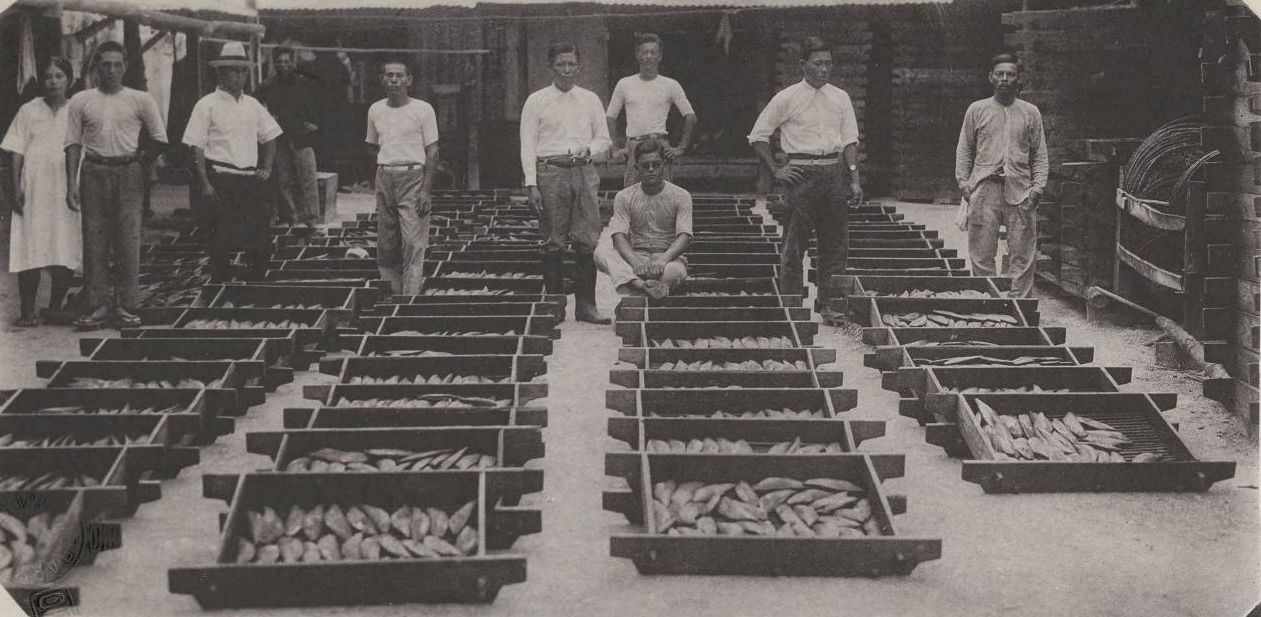
Making dried bonito at Chuuk, 1931

During World War I, many of the German possessions in the Pacific were conquered by Japan, who fought on the side of the Allies of World War I and was active in the Asian and Pacific theatre of World War I.

The Empire of Japan administered the islands from 1920 under the South Seas Mandate granted by the League of Nations. During this period, the Japanese population grew to over 100,000 throughout Micronesia, while the indigenous population was about 40,000. Sugar cane, mining, fishing and tropical agriculture became the major industries.

=== World War II ===
In World War II, Japanese-held Yap was one of the islands bypassed in the U.S. "leapfrogging" strategy, although it was regularly bombed by U.S. ships and aircraft, and Yap-based Japanese bombers did some damage in return. The Japanese garrison comprised 4,423 Imperial Japanese Army men under the command of Colonel Daihachi Itoh and 1,494 Imperial Japanese Navy men. A significant portion of the Japanese fleet was based in Truk Lagoon. In February 1944, Operation Hailstone, one of the most important naval battles of the war, took place at Truk, in which many Japanese support vessels and aircraft were destroyed.

World War II brought an abrupt end to the relative prosperity experienced during Japanese civil administration.

== Trusteeship ==
Flag of the Trust Territory of the Pacific Islands, used in the FSM from 1965 to 1978

The United Nations created the Trust Territory of the Pacific Islands (TTPI) in 1947. Pohnpei (then including Kusaie), Truk, Yap, Palau, the Marshall Islands and the Northern Mariana Islands, together constituted the TTPI. The United States accepted the role of Trustee of this, the only United Nations Trusteeship to be designated as a "Security Trusteeship", whose ultimate disposition was to be determined by the UN Security Council. As Trustee the US was to "promote the economic advancement and self-sufficiency of the inhabitants."

== Independence ==
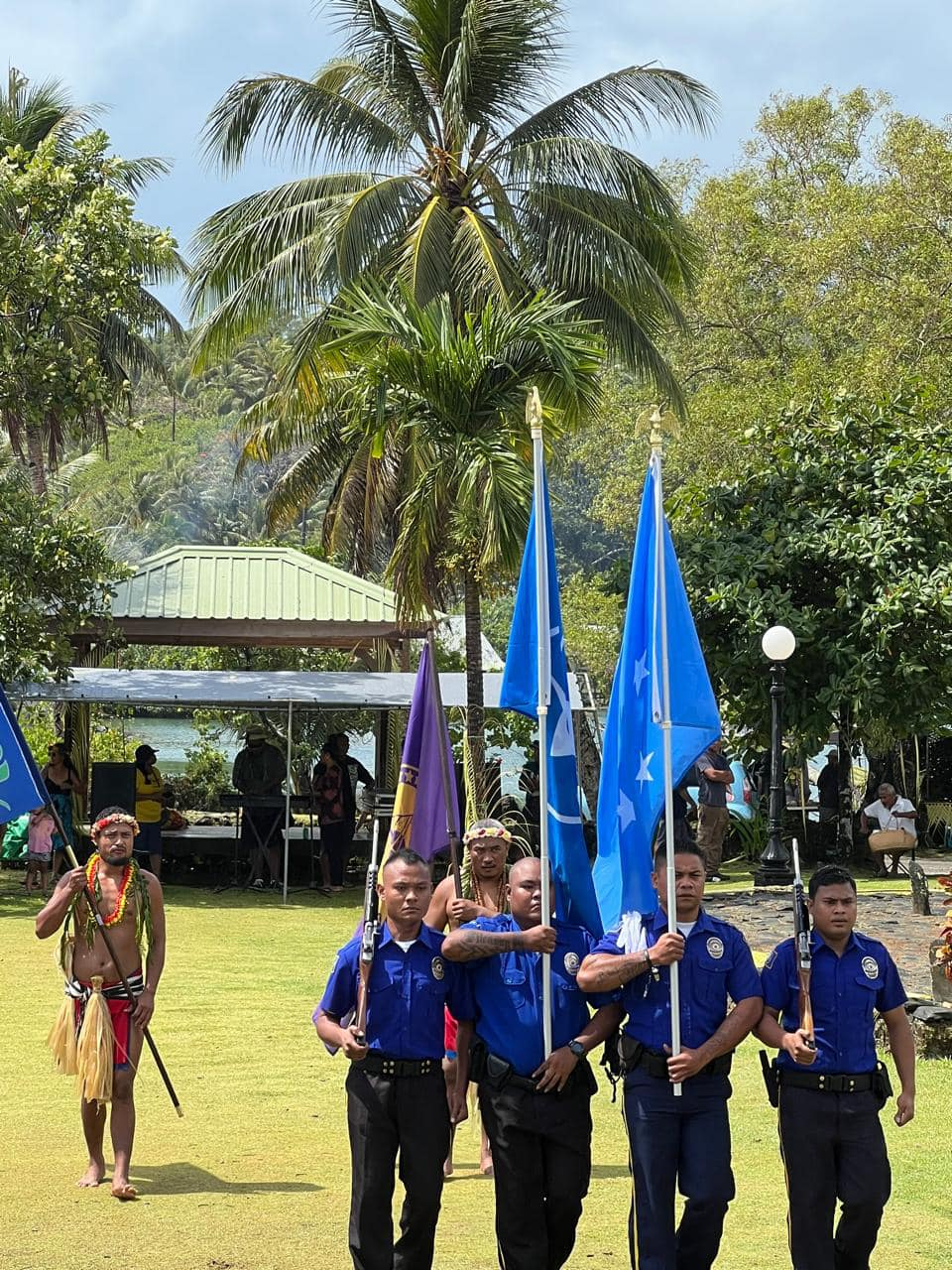
Flags of the Federated States of Micronesia, Yap State and Rull Municipality at Yap Day 2025.

On May 10, 1979, four of the Trust Territory districts ratified the Constitution of the Federated States of Micronesia. The neighboring trust districts of Palau, the Marshall Islands, and the Northern Mariana Islands chose not to participate.

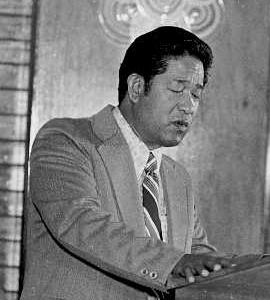
Tosiwo Nakayama, first president of the Federated States of Micronesia

Tosiwo Nakayama, the former President of the Congress of Micronesia, became the first President of the FSM and formed his Cabinet. The FSM signed a Compact of Free Association with the U.S., which entered into force on November 3, 1986, marking Micronesia's emergence from trusteeship to independence. Under the Compact, the U.S. has full authority and responsibility for the defense of the FSM. This security relationship can be changed or terminated by mutual agreement. The Compact provides U.S. grant funds and federal program assistance to the FSM. Amended financial assistance provisions came on-line in FY 2004. The basic relationship of free association continues indefinitely.

Trusteeship of the islands ended under United Nations Security Council Resolution 683, passed on December 22, 1990. The Compact was renewed in 2004.

Chuukese separatism emerged as a major political issue in Micronesia in the 2010s, following on from earlier separatism in the Faichuk Islands. The Chuuk Political Status Commission was created in 2012 to investigate options for greater autonomy or independence. An independence referendum was initially scheduled to be held in 2015, but was subsequently postponed on several occasions.

== See also ==
- History of Oceania
- President of the Federated States of Micronesia
- Vice President of the Federated States of Micronesia
- Politics of the Federated States of Micronesia
