= President of the Federated States of Micronesia =

Head of state and government

- Seal of Government of the Federated States of Micronesia

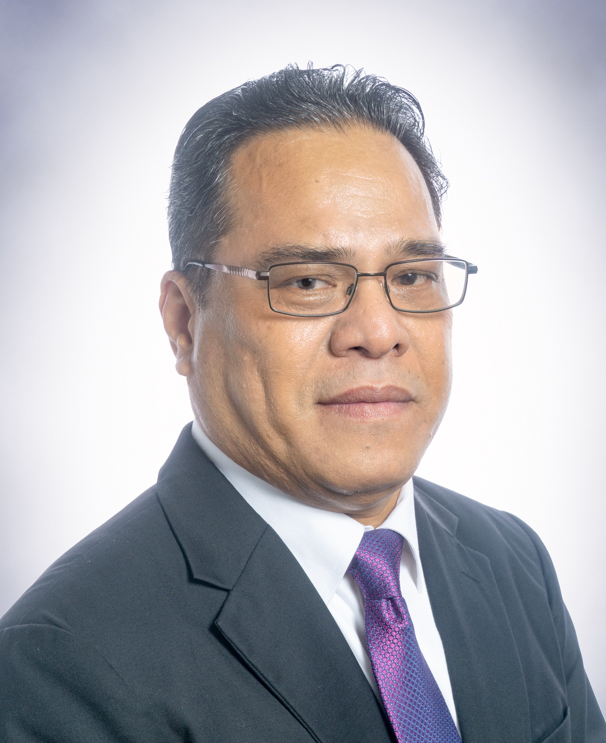
- Incumbent; Wesley Simina since 11 May 2023
- Style: Mister President (informal); His Excellency (formal)
- Seat: Palikir, Pohnpei
- Nominator: FSM Congress
- Term length: Four years, renewable once
- Constituting instrument: FSM Constitution (1979)
- Inaugural holder: Tosiwo Nakayama
- Formation: 11 May 1979; 47 years ago
- Deputy: FSM Vice President
- Salary: 80,000 USD annually
- Website: https://pio.gov.fm/

The president of the Federated States of Micronesia is the head of state and government of the Federated States of Micronesia (FSM). The FSM president, by virtue of their office, is the head of the FSM Cabinet and is in charge of the administration and operations of the National Government. The president is assisted by the vice president, both of whom are elected by the FSM Congress from among the at-large members to serve for four-year terms. The current and tenth president of the FSM is Wesley Simina, who replaced David Panuelo on 11 May 2023. The office of President was first created in 1979 as a result of a new Constitution adopted by Micronesia within the American administered Trust Territory of the Pacific Islands. In 1986, the President officially became head of state following Micronesian independence from the United States, but remaining within a Compact of Free Association.

== Qualifications ==
According to Article 10 of the FSM Constitution, people who fulfil the following requirements are eligible to serve as president.

- Must be a Senator at-Large in the FSM Congress serving for four-year terms.
- Must be a citizen of the FSM by birth.
- Must be a resident of the FSM for at least 15 years.

== Roles ==
=== Constitutional roles ===
The following powers are granted to the President.

- To execute and implement the provisions of the FSM National Constitution and national laws.
- To receive foreign ambassadors and to conduct foreign affairs and national defense.
- To grant pardons and reprieves.
- To appoint ambassadors.
- To appoint justices for the FSM Supreme Court and other courts prescribed by statute.
- To appoint heads of the executive departments (FSM Cabinet).

== Office ==
The Office of the President of the Federated States of Micronesia is located in the national capital of Palikir in Pohnpei State.

== List of presidents ==
The history of the office holders is as follows:

Status

Denotes acting president

No.	Portrait	Name (Birth–Death)	Term of office			Political party	Election	Vice President
No.	Portrait	Name (Birth–Death)	Took office	Left office	Time in office	Political party	Election	Vice President
1	Portrait of Tosiwo Nakayama	Tosiwo Nakayama (1931–2007)	11 May 1979	11 May 1987	8 years	Independent	1979	Petrus Tun
1	Portrait of Tosiwo Nakayama	Tosiwo Nakayama (1931–2007)	11 May 1979	11 May 1987	8 years	Independent	1983	Bailey Olter
2	Portrait of John Haglelgam	John Haglelgam (1949–2024)	11 May 1987	11 May 1991	4 years	Independent	1987	Hirosi Ismael
3	Portrait of Bailey Olter	Bailey Olter (1933–1999)	11 May 1991	8 November 1996 (Note: Resigned from office.)	5 years, 181 days	Independent	1991	Jacob Nena
3	Portrait of Bailey Olter	Bailey Olter (1933–1999)	11 May 1991	8 November 1996	5 years, 181 days	Independent	1995	Jacob Nena
–	Portrait of Jacob Nena	Jacob Nena (1941–2022)	8 November 1996	8 May 1997	181 days	Independent	—	Vacant
4	Portrait of Jacob Nena	Jacob Nena (1941–2022)	8 May 1997	11 May 1999	2 years, 3 days	Independent	—	Leo Falcam
5	Portrait of Leo Falcam	Leo Falcam (1935–2018)	11 May 1999	11 May 2003	4 years	Independent	1999	Redley A. Killion
6	Portrait of Joseph Urusemal	Joseph Urusemal (1952–2025)	11 May 2003	11 May 2007	4 years	Independent	2003	Redley A. Killion
7	Portrait of Manny Mori	Manny Mori (born 1949)	11 May 2007	11 May 2015	8 years	Independent	2007	Alik Alik
7	Portrait of Manny Mori	Manny Mori (born 1949)	11 May 2007	11 May 2015	8 years	Independent	2011	Alik Alik
8	Portrait of Peter M. Christian	Peter M. Christian (born 1947)	11 May 2015	11 May 2019	4 years	Independent	2015	Yosiwo George
9	Portrait of David Panuelo	David Panuelo (born 1963)	11 May 2019	11 May 2023	4 years	Independent	2019	Yosiwo George
9	Portrait of David Panuelo	David Panuelo (born 1963)	11 May 2019	11 May 2023	4 years	Independent	2019	Vacant
9	Portrait of David Panuelo	David Panuelo (born 1963)	11 May 2019	11 May 2023	4 years	Independent	2019	Aren Palik
10	Portrait of Wesley Simina	Wesley Simina (born 1961)	11 May 2023	Incumbent (Note: Simina's current mandate expires on 11 May 2027; he is eligible for re-election.)	3 years, 175 days	Independent	2023	Aren Palik

=== Timeline ===
This is a graphical lifespan timeline of the presidents of the Federated States of Micronesia. They are listed in order of first assuming office.

The following chart lists leaders by lifespan (living leaders on the green line), with the years outside of their tenure in beige.

The following chart shows leaders by their age (living leaders in green), with the years of their tenure in blue.

== See also ==
- Vice President of the Federated States of Micronesia
- High Commissioner of the Trust Territory of the Pacific Islands
