= List of islands of the Federated States of Micronesia =

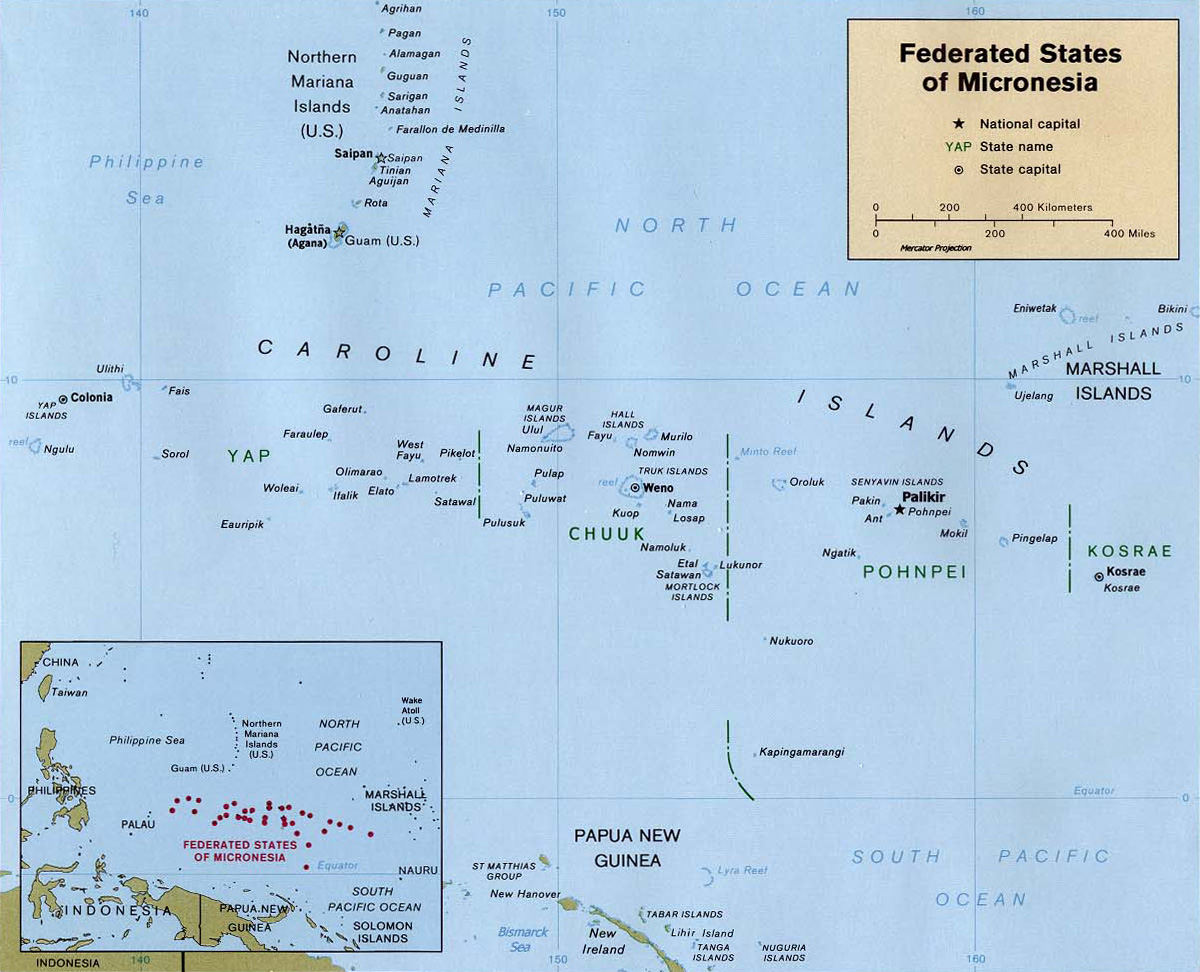
Map of the islands of the Federated States of Micronesia.

List of the islands of the Federated States of Micronesia, in the central and western Caroline Islands Archipelago of the Western Pacific Ocean. The islands are within the Micronesia cultural and ecological region of Oceania.

There are 607 islands and islets in the Federated States of Micronesia.

== List ==
Not every individual island (in italics) is listed here; if applicable, they are grouped by atoll (in plain text) and island group (in boldface).

- Chuuk Atoll
- Eauripik
- Elato
- Falalop
- Faraulep
- Fayu Atoll
- Gaferut
- **Hall Islands**
  - Nomwin
  - Murilo
- Ifalik
- Kapingamarangi
- Kosrae
- Kuop
- Lamotrek
- Lelu Island
- Mokil Atoll
- Namonuito Atoll
- **Nomoi Islands**
  - Etal Atoll
  - Losap
  - Lukunor
  - Nama
  - Namoluk
- Ngulu Atoll
- Nukuoro
- Olimarao
- Oroluk Atoll
- Pakin Atoll
- Piagailoe
- Pingelap
- Poluwat
- Pulap
- Sapwuahfik
- Satawal
- Satawan
- **Senyavin Islands**
  - Ant Atoll
  - Pakin Atoll
  - Pohnpei
- Sorol
- Ulithi
- Woleai
- Yap

== See also ==
- List of islands of Palau — in the western Caroline Islands Archipelago.
- Micronesia
