= Onoun =

Island and municipality in Chuuk State, FSM

Coordinates: 8.5812°N 149.685°E

- Municipality
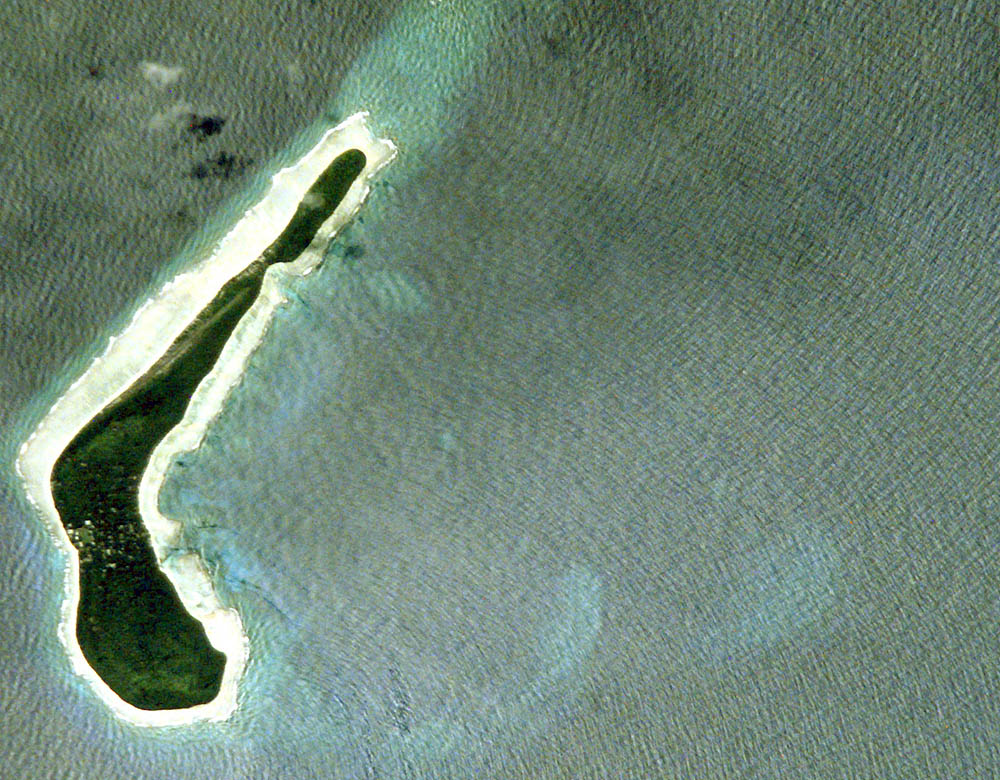
- NASA satellite picture of Onoun

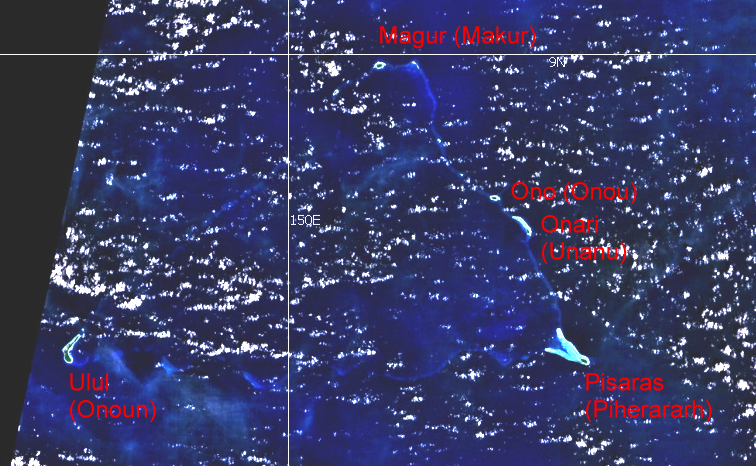
- NASA WorldWind screenshot of Namonuito Atoll showing Onoun's location
- Interactive map of Onoun
- Country: Federated States of Micronesia
- State: Chuuk State

Area
  - Land: 2.54 km^{2} (0.98 sq mi)

Population (2010)
  - Total: 633
- Time zone: UTC+10

Onoun, also known as Ulul, is the westernmost island of Namonuito Atoll and a municipality in Chuuk State, Federated States of Micronesia.

== Etymology ==
The name of the island goes back to Proto-Chuukic *unouno.

== History ==
=== Pre-colonial history ===
In pre-colonial times Onoun was an independent polity with a society organized into clans. Its people, according to oral lore, originated on Fananu. While each clan had its own chief (hómwoolun áynang), the island's Traditional Chief (hómwoolun ééreni) held power over all Onoun and was involved in customary affairs. Namonuito Atoll was part of the sawei system of tribute and trade, sending their tribute to Polowat, in a network that led to the system's head, Gagil, on Yap. As the easternmost atoll involved in sawei, it had the lowest rank, therefore it did not receive tribute itself and was the first to send tribute in Yap's direction annually. The system ceased to function with German colonisation.

Onoun's relations with Polowat were sour in the late 19th century, and this led to the island's vacation by its original population. They exchanged raids; a destructive one on Pulap by Onoun warriors before the 1880s, itself motivated by revenge over an earlier raid on Makur from Pattiw, led to Polowatese retaliation. Facing this impending attack, the entire population of Onoun, except for one woman, fled to the Mariana Islands.

=== Resettlement and colonial period ===
The forsaken island was resettled by people of Tamatam and eastern Namonuito people following a Piherarh man; both of these groups disputed the right to Onoun. The arrival of the German land-owner Dominique Etscheit in the 1880s brought about an agreement between him and the eastern Namonuito settlers' chief, allowing for him to build a copra plantation in exchange for his support for the expulsion of the Tamatam settlers.

Onoun people in Saipan that had previously worked on Tinian established the village of Tanapag on an unclear date; 1870 and 1889 have both been given as years for the village's formation by William H. Alkire and Paul D'Arcy respectively. The Tanapag language (Talaabog) has a high rate of mutual intelligibility with Namonuito.

With the Japanese occupation of the Caroline Islands in World War I, the South Seas Trading Company purchased Etscheit's plantation and a meteorological station was constructed that would be bombed in World War II.

World War II ended in 1945, and Namonuito along with the rest of the South Seas Mandate was reorganized into the United States-administered Trust Territory of the Pacific Islands in 1947. Onoun and the other Namonuito islands became municipalities in 1948. Descendants of the Tamatam settlers who were earlier expelled from Onoun were authorized to return to Onoun in 1949. While this restarted the ownership dispute between Onoun's two communities, it had become irrelevant by the 1970s.

Onoun became a subdistrict center of Chuuk District in 1973.

=== Independent Micronesia ===
The sovereign Federated States of Micronesia was formed out of the Pohnpei, Chuuk, Yap and Kosrae districts in 1979. These districts became states, and Onoun remained a municipality in Chuuk State.

== Demographics ==
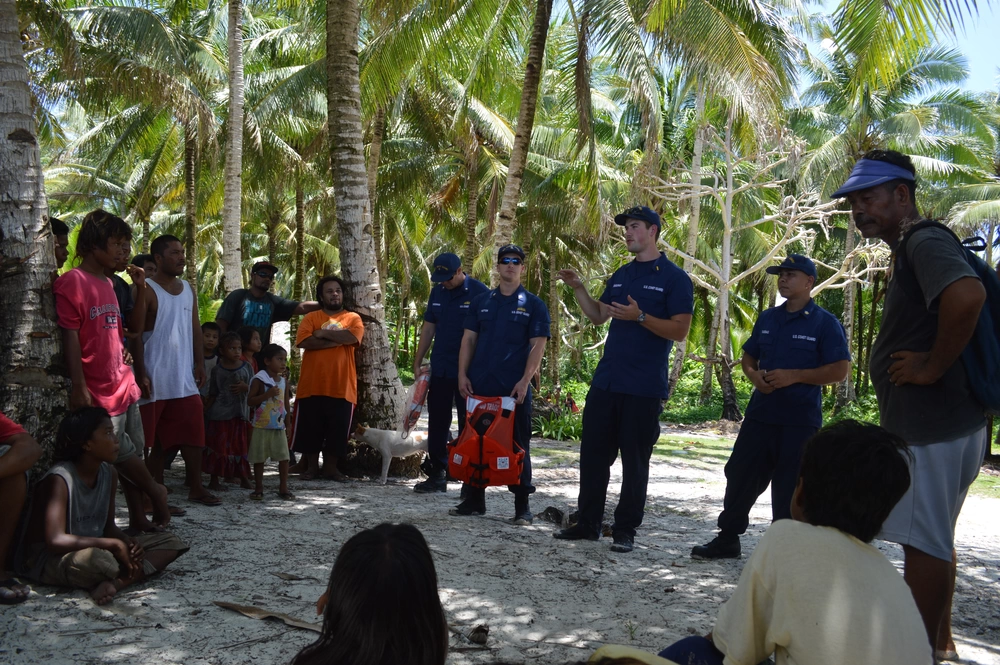
Residents of Onoun and US Coast Guard crew

=== Language ===
The Namonuito language, classified as Severely Endangered in the UNESCO's Atlas of the World's Languages in Danger is spoken by the people of Onoun and the rest of Namonuito Atoll.

=== Localized clans ===
- Álengeytaw
- Fánimey
- Hóponopi
- Mwóóŕ
- Piik (chiefly clan)
- Pweraka
- Pwéél
- Uun (former chiefly clan)
- Witté

== Buildings ==
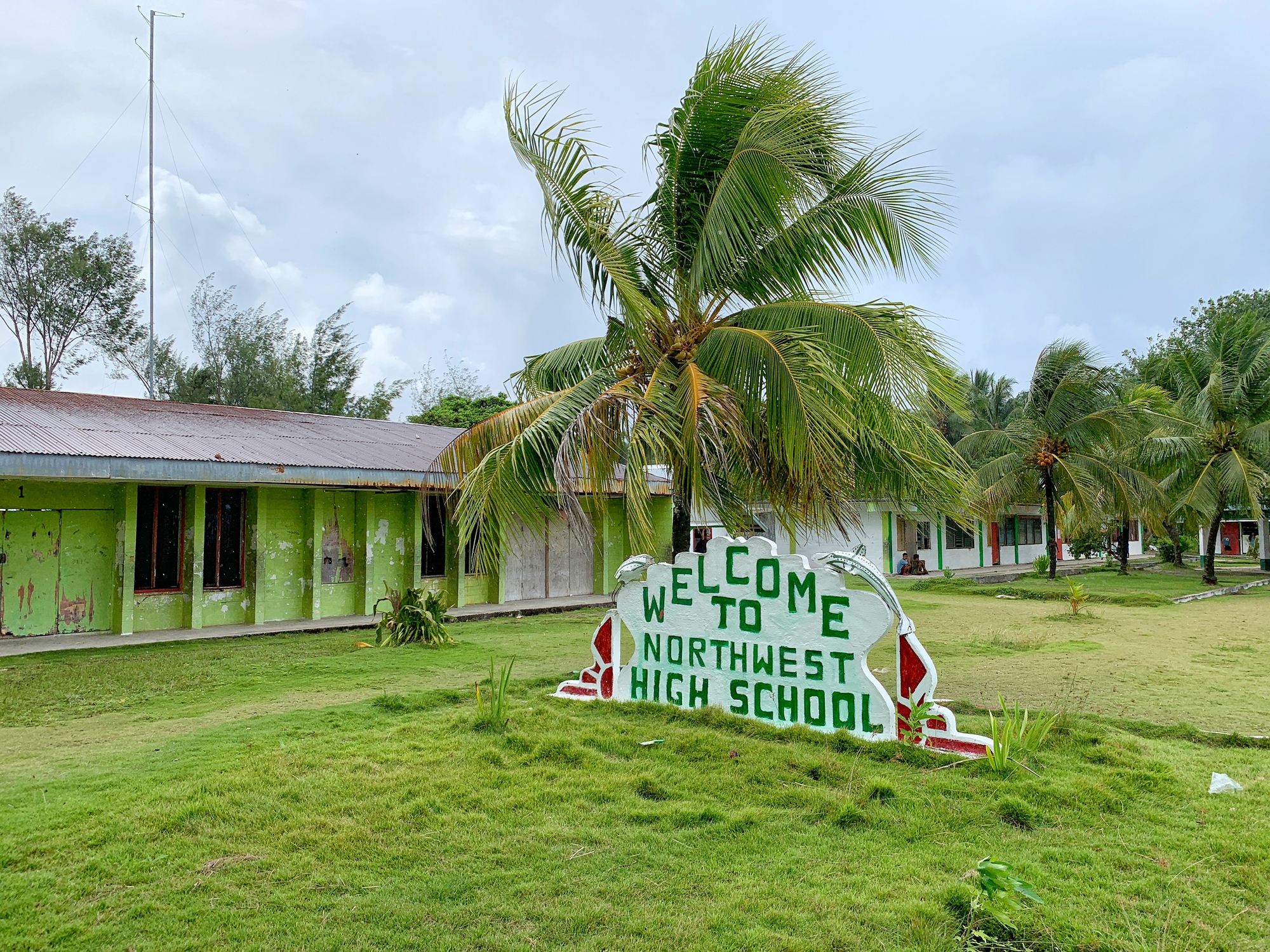
Northwest High School

Onoun Airfield
- IATA: none; ICAO: none

Summary
- Airport type: Public
- Owner: Government
- Operator: Civil Government
- Serves: Namonuito Atoll
- Interactive map of Onoun Airfield

Runways
Direction	Length		Surface
Direction	ft	m	Surface
	1,200	370	Chipseal

An airstrip on Onoun allows regularly scheduled flights by Caroline Islands Air to the capital, Weno. Structures on the island include a school, municipal buildings, residences, and ruins of fortifications built during World War II.

== See also ==
- Namonuito Atoll – The atoll Onoun is a part of
- Piherarh – Another municipality of Namonuito
- Unanu – Another municipality of Namonuito
- Onou – Another municipality of Namonuito
- Makur, Chuuk – Another municipality of Namonuito
