= Fananu =

Island in Chuuk State, Federal States of Micronesia

Coordinates: 8.5586°N 151.9045°E

- Municipality
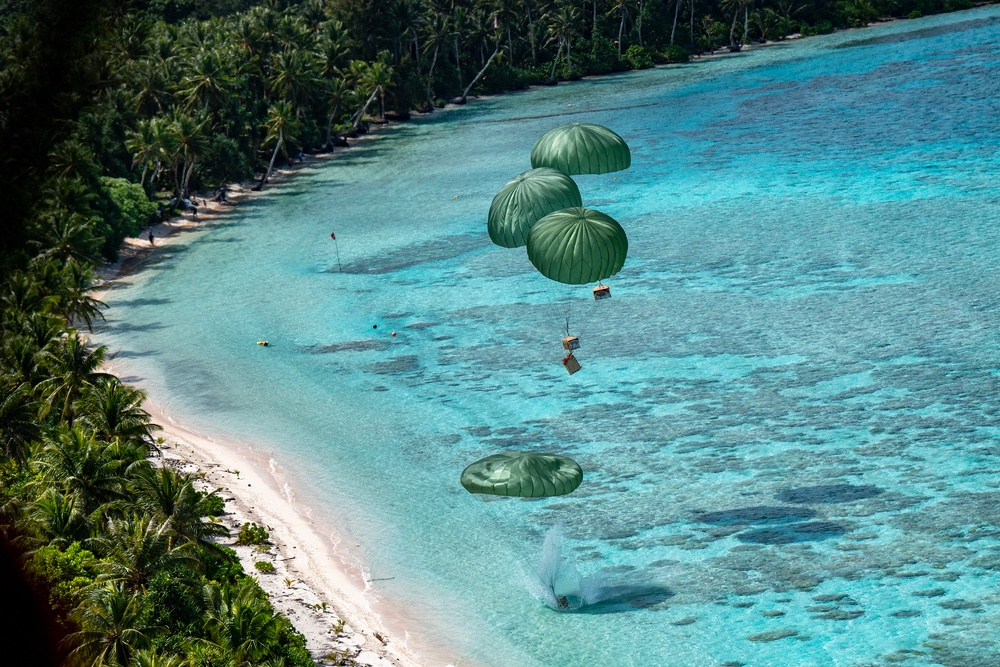
- The shoreline of Fananu

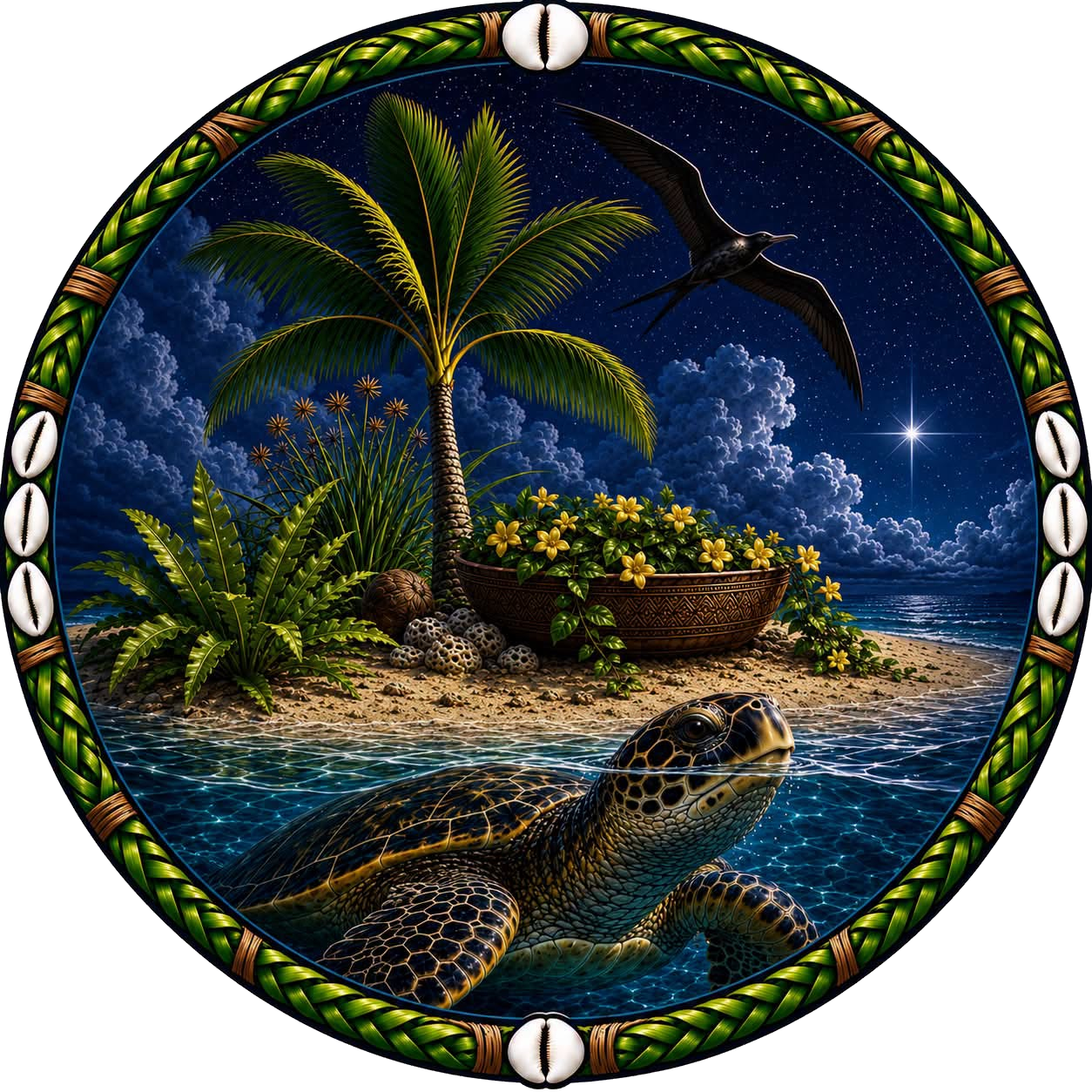
- Seal
- Interactive map of Fananu
- Country: Federated States of Micronesia
- State: Chuuk State

Area
  - Land: 1.29 km^{2} (0.50 sq mi)

Population (2010)
  - Total: 580
- Time zone: UTC+10

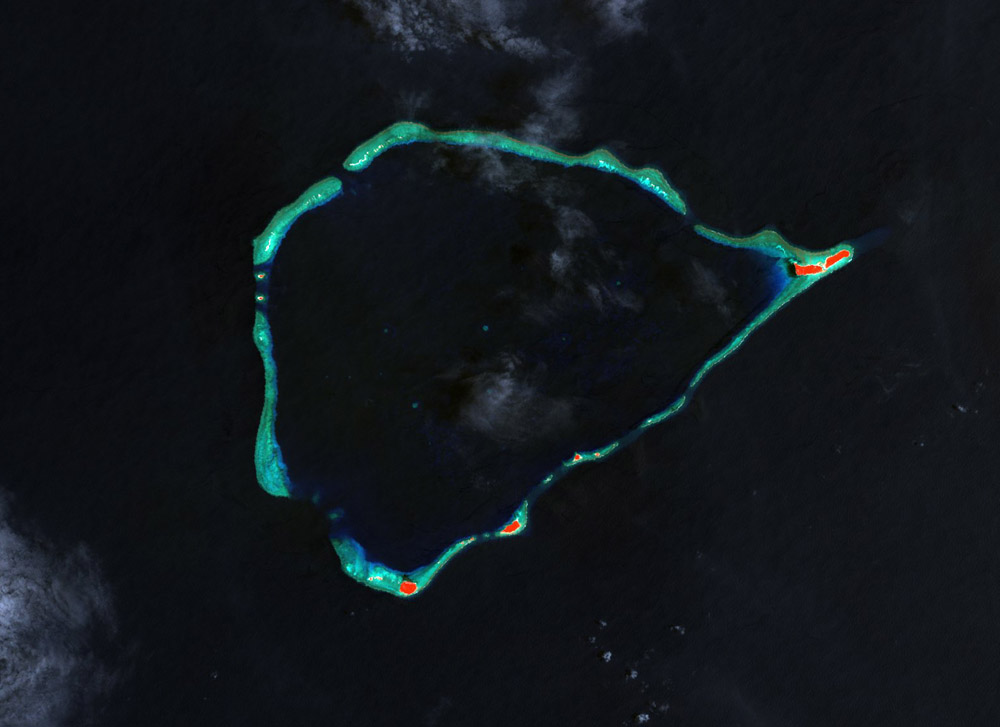
Nomwin atoll

Fananu is a municipality in the state of Chuuk, Federated States of Micronesia. Consisting of the easternmost islands of Nomwin Atoll and the westernmost islands of Murilo Atoll, it, along with the municipalities of Nomwin, Ruo and Murilo, is part of the Hall Islands. The Halls, along with Namonuito Atoll and Pattiw (Western islands) are considered "Northwest Outer Islands" in Chuuk State.
