= USS Tunny (SS-282) =

Submarine of the United States

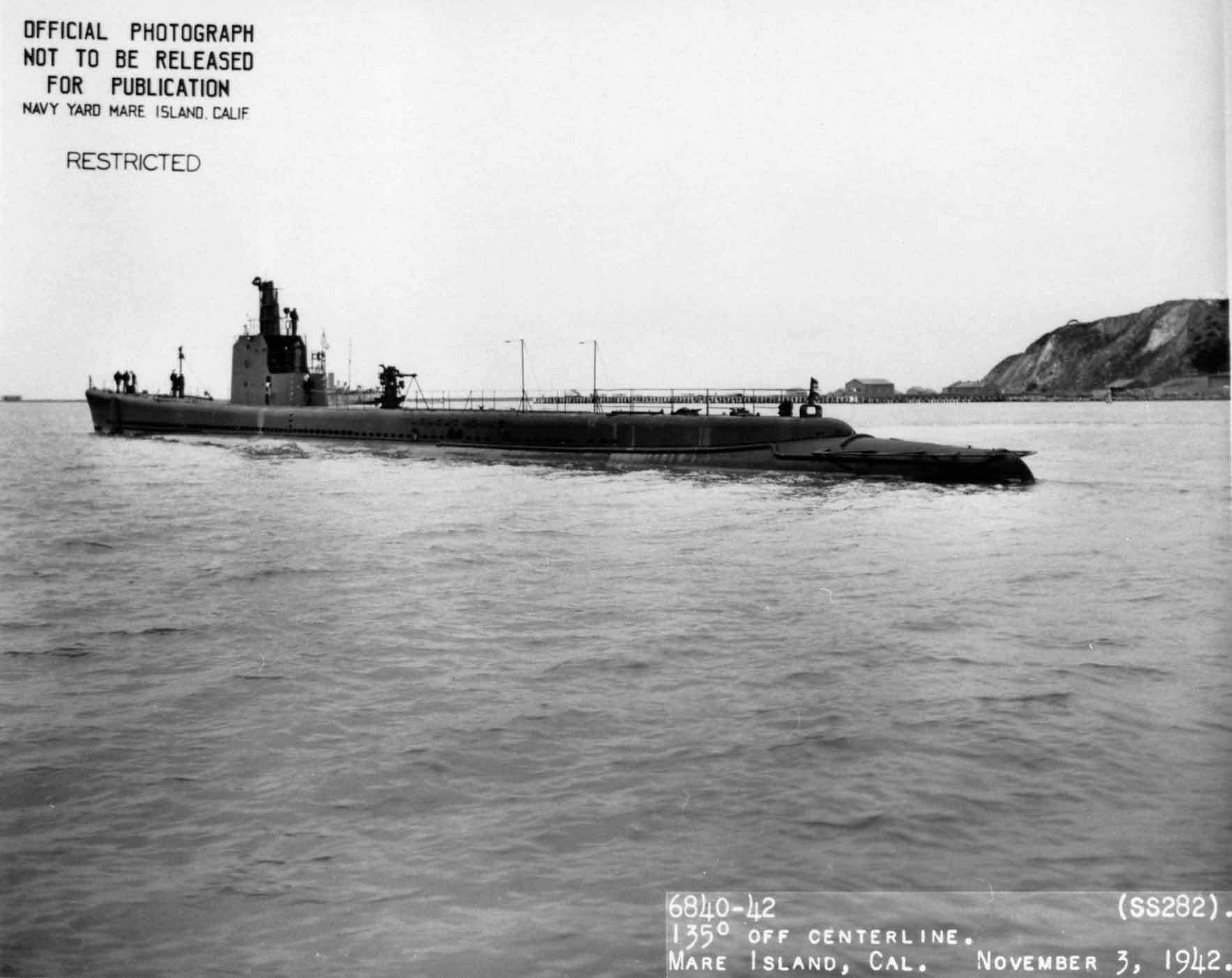
- USS Tunny (SS-282) off the Mare Island Navy Yard, California, in late 1942.

History

United States
- Builder: Mare Island Naval Shipyard
- Laid down: 10 November 1941
- Launched: 30 June 1942
- Commissioned: 1 September 1942
- Decommissioned: 12 February 1946
- Recommissioned: 25 February 1952
- Decommissioned: 30 April 1952
- Recommissioned: 6 March 1953
- Decommissioned: 28 June 1969
- Stricken: 30 June 1969
- Fate: Sunk as a target, 19 June 1970

General characteristics
- Class & type: Gato-class diesel-electric submarine
- Displacement: 1,525 long tons (1,549 t) surfaced; 2,424 long tons (2,463 t) submerged
- Length: 311 ft 9 in (95.02 m)
- Beam: 27 ft 3 in (8.31 m)
- Draft: 17 ft 0 in (5.18 m) maximum
- Propulsion: 4 × Fairbanks-Morse Diesel engines, 2 × 126-cell Lead-acid batteries, 4 × high-speed electric motors with reduction gears, 2 shafts
- Speed: 21 knots (39 km/h) surfaced; 9 knots (17 km/h) submerged
- Range: 11,000 nautical miles (20,000 km) surfaced at 10 knots (19 km/h)
- Endurance: 48 hours at 2 knots (3.7 km/h) submerged; 75 days on patrol
- Test depth: 300 feet (91 m)
- Complement: 6 officers, 54 enlisted
- Armament: As built: 10 × 21-inch (533 mm) torpedo tubes; 6 forward, 4 aft; 24 torpedoes; 1 × 5-inch (127 mm) / 25 caliber deck gun; Bofors 40 mm and Oerlikon 20 mm cannon; As Regulus missile submarine 1953-65: 1 × Regulus missile hangar and launcher; 2 × Regulus I missiles; 10 × 21 inch (533 mm) torpedo tubes (six forward, four aft); 24 torpedoes

USS Tunny (SS/SSG/APSS/LPSS-282) was a Gato-class submarine which saw service in World War II and in the Vietnam War. Tunny received nine battle stars and two Presidential Unit Citations for her World War II service and five battle stars for her operations during the Vietnam War. Tunny was the first ship of the United States Navy to be named for the tunny, any of several oceanic fishes resembling the mackerel.

== Construction ==
Tunny's keel was laid down on 10 November 1941 at Vallejo, California, by the Mare Island Navy Yard. She was launched on 30 June 1942, sponsored by Mrs. Frederick G. Crisp, wife of Rear Admiral Frederick G. Crisp, manager of the Mare Island Navy Yard, and commissioned on 1 September 1942.

== World War II service ==
=== September 1942–January 1943 ===
After commissioning, Tunny conducted shakedown training from California ports. On 29 November 1942, at a position in the Pacific Ocean off California which the armed tanker SS Huguenot reported as 34°49′N 121°22′W but actually was in the vicinity of 33°50′N 120°00′W, Huguenot mistook Tunny for a Japanese submarine and opened gunfire on her. Tunny was under escort by the submarine chaser USS SC-631, which was about 5,000 yards (4,600 m) from Tunny on her starboard quarter at the time. Tunny pulled away from at high speed to a range of 14,000 yards (12,800 m) and avoided damage and casualties.

After completing shakedown, Tunny arrived in the Hawaiian Islands on 12 December 1942. She then engaged in an additional week of training, followed by two weeks repairs.

=== First war patrol (12 January – 20 February 1943) ===
She got underway from Submarine Base, Pearl Harbor, on 12 January 1943 for her first war patrol. For nearly a week, rough seas hampered the progress of the submarine. Then, as she approached the Ryukyu Islands, sea traffic increased. Sightings of sampans became frequent, and Tunny often dove to avoid detection by suspicious-looking trawlers.

At 05:30 on 26 January, Tunny sighted masts and a stack over the horizon indicating a possible target. During the day, she lessened the distance between herself and her quarry; and, near dusk, she closed a 400-ton trawler. Finding the prey not worth a torpedo, the submarine surfaced and opened fire with her deck gun. Soon, darkness forced her to discontinue the attack, and she continued on her way.

On 29 January, she began patrolling off Formosa. An hour and a half before midnight on 31 January, her periscope at last disclosed a worthwhile target, a freighter approaching Takao Ko. Tunny fired two "fish" from her bow tubes, but the freighter made a radical change of course which enabled her to evade the torpedoes. When her target counterattacked and dropped two depth charges, Tunny broke off the attack and submerged.

On 1 February, Tunny set her course for the China coast, running on the surface. As darkness fell on 2 February, she was only hours from Hong Kong, expecting to make landfall on Tamkan Island by daybreak. At 2130, she made radar contact; and, through the night, drew closer to her as yet unseen quarry.

A light rain was falling and visibility was poor when, half an hour before morning twilight, Tunny began a radar approach. Rapidly shoaling water less than 20 fathoms (37 m) deep and land masses on two sides of the submarine limited her maneuverability. At 2,200 yards (2,000 m), the extreme phosphorescence of the water illuminated her wake and betrayed her presence to the enemy ship, which began signaling the unidentified intruder with a blinker light. Despite her detection, Tunny continued the approach until she was only 1,000 yards (1,000 m) from the target and then launched three torpedoes. The Japanese ship, now discernible as a loaded tanker, began to maneuver radically and opened fire on the submarine. Undeterred, Tunny submerged and continued the attack, firing a second volley from her stern tubes. One of these torpedoes hit the side of the tanker with a thud, but without explosion, and a small column of water erupted just forward of the tanker's bridge. Duds and prematures were a problem for American submarines early in 1943, and verification that this torpedo had indeed hit the tanker, but failed to detonate, was forthcoming when members of the tanker's crew dashed to the spot in question and began examining the impact area with flashlights. Despite continuous fire from the ship and the proximity of land, Tunny managed to stay within firing range of her target by traveling at full speed. After the tanker successfully evaded Tunny's third salvo, the submarine fired a last torpedo from 1,600 yards (1,500 m) as the intended victim reached the passage into Hong Kong. Following this disappointing conclusion to her attack, Tunny dove in anticipation of search planes which appeared within two hours and continued their surveillance throughout the day.

After dark on 3 February, while patrolling Lema Channel, Tunny made radar contact with a sizable target. On this very dark night, visual identification was impossible; but, at 2005, the submarine approached to 900 yards (800 m) and made a three-torpedo attack. The sound of the target's screws ceased immediately, and Tunny claimed to have sunk this unidentified ship which had been seen only on radar. When the submarine surfaced at daybreak the following day, the submariners discovered an unexpected visitor on deck—a six-foot black and yellow striped snake.

On 4 February, Tunny set her course for Swatow, keeping to the shoreline in hopes of intercepting shipping. En route, she passed a large hospital ship well marked and brilliantly lighted. On 6 February and 7 February, Tunny patrolled off Swatow. Numerous junks plying the Formosa and Swatow banks at all hours added to the hazards imposed by shallow water, and an inoperable fathometer (depthmeter) made it impossible for Tunny to approach the shore closer than six miles (9.7 km).

Early on the morning of 8 February, she went deep to avoid a plane revealed by radar. When she surfaced, she discovered a freighter 10,000 yards (10,000 m) off her beam. She shadowed the target during the day and, after sunset, made her approach and launched two torpedoes from a distance of 830 yards (760 m). Due to bad runs, neither of these took effect, but they did alert the freighter, which opened fire on Tunny. The submarine fired two shots from her bow tubes, but one torpedo missed, and the other circled around to the right. Tunny then drew ahead for a surface approach and fired three more torpedoes. Two of these found the mark; but one put on an amazing show, veering sharply first to the left and then to the right, before hitting the target. The Kusayama Maru, a heavily laden, 5000-ton cargo ship, sank by the stern in 20 minutes; Tunny had scored her first confirmed kill. As she proceeded on towards Takao harbor, a searchlight suddenly pierced the dark not far ahead, and Tunny dove to avoid detection.

The next day, Tunny sighted a large transport. Undetected by two nearby patrol vessels and a plane, she made her approach and scored two hits on the transport with her remaining torpedoes. However, the ship did not sink and later left the area.

On 11 February, Tunny set her course for Midway Island. En route, she used a combination of 20 millimeter and five-inch (127 mm) gunfire to sink a 100-ton fishing trawler. On 20 February, she made contact with the harbor escort and proceeded to moor at Midway Island, completing her first aggressive and successful patrol. She later continued on to Hawaii, arriving at Pearl Harbor on 24 February 1943.

=== Second war patrol (24 March – 23 April 1943) ===
After refitting by tender Sperry (AS-12) and three days of training, Tunny departed the Hawaiian Islands on 18 March, paused at Midway Island for replacement of her periscope, and got underway for Wake Island on 24 March. Later, Commander, Submarine Force, Pacific Fleet, would describe Tunny's second war patrol as belonging "in that exceptional category of one of the outstandingly aggressive patrols of the war."

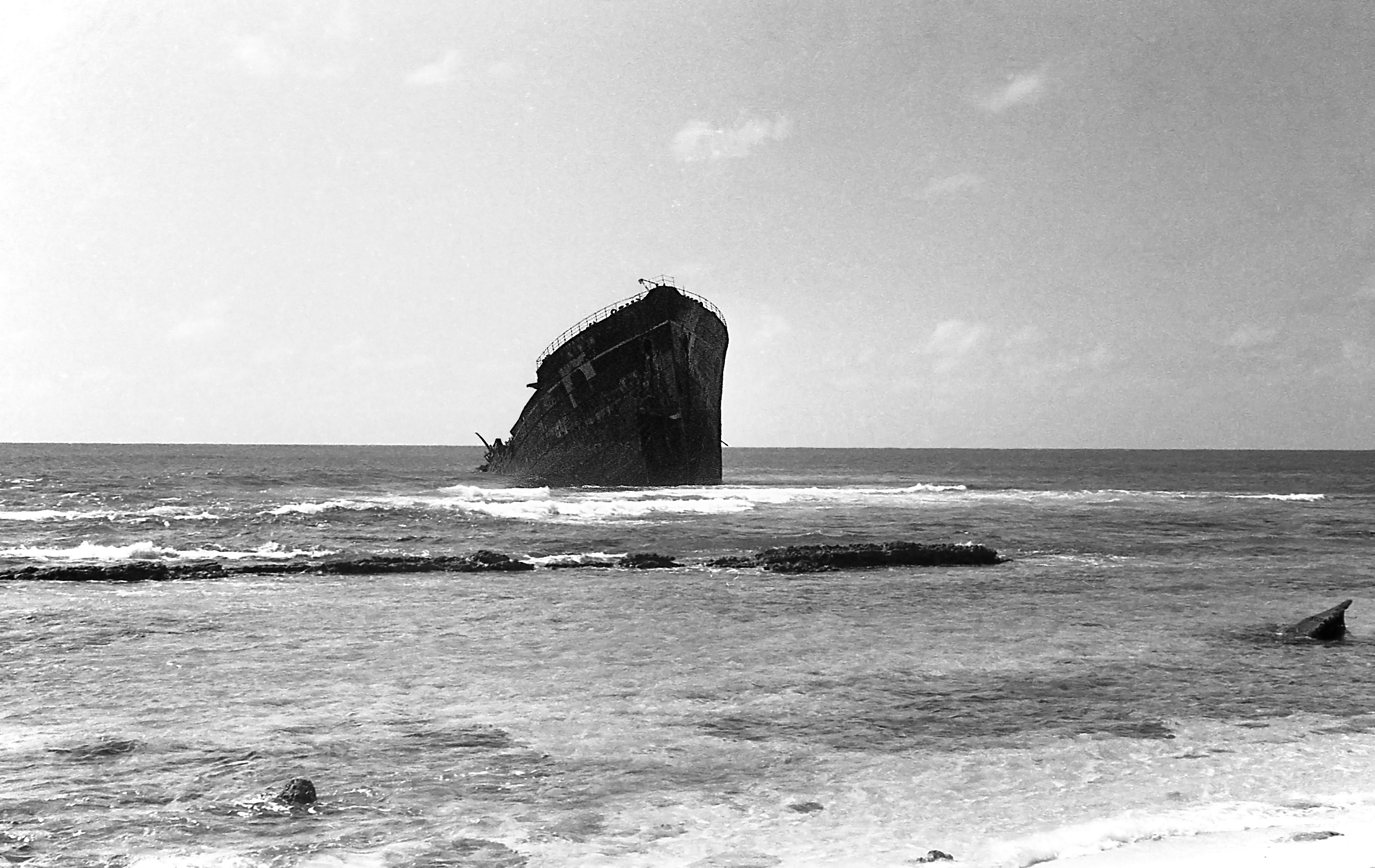
Suwa Maru aground off Wake Island after being damaged by USS Tunny 28 March 1943

On 27 March 1943, Tunny arrived off Wake Island and operated within a 200-nautical-mile (370 km; 230 mi) circle all day, flooding down the decks awash when within 30 nautical miles (56 km; 35 mi) of the island. Before dawn the next morning, she closed to within ten miles (16 km) of the Japanese-held island and watched as its awakening occupants turned on their lights. A motor torpedo boat and two patrol boats passed by less than 600 yards (500 m) from the submarine without detecting her presence. Trailing these vessels, Tunny came upon a cargo ship, Suwa Maru, and all hands scrambled to battle stations. Shortly after sunrise, the submarine launched her attack, firing two torpedoes from a range of 700 yards (600 m). The first found its mark and blew the stern off the enemy ship, but the buoyancy of the lightly loaded vessel kept it afloat. Tunny was maneuvering at periscope depth to avoid depth charges dropped across her bow at a range of 300 yards (300 m) when the first of several aerial bombs fell close aboard. The submarine dove to 280 feet (85 m). When she attempted to surface an hour later, Tunny was again driven down by an aerial adversary. Later in the morning, traveling submerged at 150 feet (46 m), she set her course for her assigned patrol area.

On 31 March, she entered the patrol area in the Caroline Islands, and, on 1 April 1943, she conducted submerged patrols off North Pass Island, Truk, and later in the day on the Japanese naval base's western approaches. Failing to find any action in these areas, she surfaced late in the afternoon on 2 April and set her course for the channel between Puluwat Island and Pulap Island. Later that day, as she patrolled off Alet Island, Tunny made radar contact with a ship dead ahead. Heading in for a flank attack, she sighted a Momo-class destroyer 1,000 yards (1,000 m) astern of her chosen target. Tunny launched three torpedoes from 960 yards (880 m) and noted a hit in the forward hold of the Japanese cargo ship before diving to 300 feet (90 m) to avoid the attention of the destroyer. Minutes later, a series of nine depth charges tumbled down in search of the submarine, but exploded at too shallow a depth to achieve their purpose. Some 15 minutes later, as Tunny started up to take a look, she was jolted by a deep-set depth charge which caught her at 260 feet (79 m), but caused only minor damage—a small price to pay for the sinking of Toyo Maru Number 2. Before midnight, the destroyer gave up the search, and the submarine surfaced and set her course for the Namonuito group to the north.

Late on 4 April, Tunny headed west to intercept traffic reported north of McLaughlin Bank. On 7 April, while patrolling in that area, the submarine took advantage of a rain squall to approach within 1,000 yards (1,000 m) of a radar-tracked target. She then launched two torpedoes at the Kosei Maru, an 8000-ton passenger-cargo ship, scoring a hit amidships and one aft, and dove immediately to escape the inevitable wrath of the escorting Akatsuki-class destroyer which had been patrolling just ahead of the now-stricken transport. The ensuing depth charge counterattack continued until the destroyer lost contact with the submarine in a heavy rain squall. Having added a third cargo ship to her list of kills, Tunny retired from the scene of the attack.

On 8 April, the submarine surfaced in a downpour to continue patrols north of West Fayu Island. Later that day, she set her course to intercept a convoy reported to be southwest of Truk. At 22:28 on 9 April, she made radar contact with a formation less than three miles (4.8 km) distant and went to four engines to maneuver into position for an attack. In a few minutes, the formation changed course, putting Tunny in position to slow down to two-thirds speed and head in, flooded down to decks awash to avoid detection. As the convoy became visible, Tunny's commanding officer, Commander James A. Scott, could hardly believe his luck. On the starboard bow was a large aircraft carrier, to port two auxiliary carriers, and on each bow of the formation, a destroyer. Given this perfect setup, Tunny maneuvered to swing the bow on twin targets, but her plans were disrupted when three small boats similar to motor torpedo boats appeared only 300 yards (300 m) off her port bow. Tunny quickly dove to 40 feet (12 m), turned right, ninety degrees, and launched four torpedoes from her stern tubes at one of the auxiliary carriers from a distance of 880 yards (800 m). As she turned her attention to other targets, four torpedo explosions sounded through the night.

Signaling from her new target gave executive officer Lieutenant Commander Roger Keithly at the conn a final check on the target's bearing, and Tunny released a salvo of six torpedoes from her bow tubes at the large carrier. Her surprise attack completed, Tunny immediately dove amidst the cacophony of depth charges and churning screws. The depth charges rocked the submarine but did no damage; and the crackling and grinding noises heard throughout the ship, as well as on sonar, led those on board the submarine to believe that their "fish" had found their mark. In all this noise and confusion, Tunny unobtrusively slipped away to the north. Later, examination of Japanese records showed that this attack was ruined by prematures and duds, and that damage to the enemy had been minor. However, the skill and daring with which the raid was conducted remained an example of excellence and prompted the Commander, Submarine Force, Pacific Fleet, to commend Tunny's commander for his actions on this patrol as "an illustrious example of professional competence and military aggressiveness."

An hour and a half after midnight on 10 April, the submarine surfaced and set her course to return to her patrol area. While approaching North Pass about 25 nautical miles (46 km; 29 mi) from Truk on 11 April, Tunny dove when a searchlight suddenly broke the night, 500 yards (500 m) ahead on the starboard bow. No depth charges followed, and the source of the light—not sizable enough to be detected on radar—was presumed to be a small boat.

Early on the afternoon of 11 April, a contact, at first thought to be a patrol boat, turned out to be a Japanese submarine. The designation symbol of the enemy submarine was emblazoned on her sail, spelling out I-9 in large white characters. Boldly taking the offensive, Tunny fired her three remaining forward "fish" at the submarine, only to see the vessel turn away and parallel the course of the torpedoes. Tunny then began her own evasive procedures, going deep and away from the Japanese submersible—and none too soon. Minutes later, she tracked two torpedoes which passed harmlessly astern. An enemy plane added bombs to Tunny's immediate concerns, but she rigged for silent running and weathered the attack by remaining submerged until after nightfall.

That same evening, as Tunny lay on the surface in the bright moonlight charging her batteries, she made radar contact with a ship moving at 18 knots (33 km/h). Within minutes, the contact materialized into an enemy destroyer steaming on the starboard bow. Tunny dove to 44 feet (13 m) and began to swing for a stern shot when the belligerent destroyer increased speed to a thundering 30 knots (56 km/h) and headed in from a distance of less than 1,400 yards (1,300 m). As the submarine dove for 400 feet (120 m), the explosions of nine depth charges fairly close by pursued her. Silent running and a quick reversal of course eventually shook off the menacing destroyer, and Tunny returned to the surface after the moon set, noting only minor damage from the attack.

In the days that followed, Tunny patrolled off East Fayu Island and north of Mogami Bank before setting her course for Saipan on 15 April. Her surveillance of Magicienne Harbor disclosed that it was not in use. Seeking targets, the submarine passed through Saipan Channel and later discovered two cargo ships in Garapan Harbor. Prevented from attacking by the presence of intervening reefs, Tunny departed the area and moored in the lagoon at Midway Island on 23 April for a welcome rest. So aggressive had been her handling on this eventful patrol that not one of her firing ranges exceeded 1,000 yards (1,000 m). She was awarded the Presidential Unit Citation for this outstanding patrol.

=== Third war patrol (27 April – 14 July 1943) ===
After refitting at Midway Island, Tunny continued on to Hawaii for additional repairs. She departed Pearl Harbor on 25 May 1943 and, after fueling at Johnston Island, got underway on 27 April for Eniwetok. Her first contact with the enemy on this third war patrol came early in the afternoon on 31 May when she dove to avoid a radar contact whose speed identified it as a plane. As Tunny passed 300 feet (90 m), a bomb exploded over her after torpedo room, breaking lights and thermometers, flooding the after torpedo tubes, and causing miscellaneous other damage. An unsatisfactory makeshift repair of the broken bridge speaker prompted a note in the war patrol report that "the only dependable communication system was the open hatch and a powerful set of lungs." Other repairs were completed before nightfall, and Tunny continued on her way. She patrolled off Eniwetok for two days; then moved on to her assigned area, arriving at Truk on 6 June.

As this patrol progressed, Tunny discovered that antisubmarine action by the Japanese at Truk had shifted to aerial detection. On 7 June, her first day of patrol, she was harassed by a single float biplane and an ineffectual Japanese destroyer. Tunny found the enemy biplanes a great nuisance, since her radar detected them late or not at all. Soon she came to regard the aircraft as an arch-enemy which thwarted attacks on convoys by hovering overhead and guiding possible targets around the submarine, out of firing range.

On 14 June, as Tunny cruised on the surface following a submerged patrol east of Murilo Island in the Hall group, one of her lookouts sighted a convoy bearing 090 degrees. Made up of two small freighters and a large transport and accompanied by two destroyers, the convoy was a tempting target. As Tunny made her approach, an unobserved escort vessel suddenly challenged her with a searchlight and several rounds of four-inch (102 mm) fire which fell astern. The submarine dove to 300 feet (90 m) but continued her approach. She then surfaced and launched four torpedoes at the transport from a range of 3,400 yards (3,100 m). Three explosions and a tremendous cloud of smoke and water over the target indicated that Tunny had damaged the enemy vessel. The submarine dove to avoid the escorts, but no depth charging ensued. Shortly after midnight, as she ran on the surface attempting to intercept the convoy, an undetected vessel fired shots which splashed astern. Tunny dove again.

As June wore on, Tunny continued patrols as far as Saipan without success. On 26 June, she conducted routine and photographic reconnaissance of Saipan Harbor and Tinian Channel and, later that day, surfaced to patrol the Truk-Empire shipping lanes east of Rota Island. Patrolling off Harnum Point and Rota harbor on 28 June, Tunny sighted a converted gunboat zigzagging madly, went to battle stations, and dispatched the enemy vessel with a salvo of three torpedoes from 1,500 yards (1,400 m). Sighting an armed trawler bearing down on her, the submarine dove. Those on board felt the concussion of three sharp explosions close aboard, perhaps from aerial bombs, as Tunny went deep and rigged for silent running, maneuvering to avoid the trawler. Seconds later, two heavy explosions marked the death throes of Tunny's most recent victim. Tunny was chased down again by the trawler when she attempted to surface an hour later. Returning to periscope depth some three hours after the attack, her commanding officer at the periscope was relieved to find no sign of the trawler, but his relief quickly turned to alarm when the periscope revealed a close-up of the bomb bay of a Mitsubishi Type 97 at 300 feet (90 m), directly overhead. This time Tunny waited four hours before surfacing again 13 nautical miles (24 km; 15 mi) from Guam.

She patrolled off Guam until 4 July when she received orders to leave the area. Early the next day, she set her course for Johnston Island. Japanese aircraft continued to badger the submarine for two days as she proceeded toward Hawaii. After taking on fuel and provisions at Johnston Island on 11 July, she completed her third patrol at Pearl Harbor on 14 July.

=== Fourth war patrol (10 August – 8 September 1943) ===
After refitting and three days of training, Tunny departed Hawaii on 5 August for Midway Island. She arrived at Midway Island on 9 August and was again underway on 10 August. On 18 August, she sighted Pagan Island and Alamagan Island; and, on 22 August, she entered her assigned area in the Palau Islands and began patrols. Early in the morning of 24 August, she sighted a six-ship convoy as it emerged from Toagel Mlungui Pass. Tunny trailed the convoy until she could obtain a good firing position and, at moonrise on 25 August, she submerged to 40 feet (12 m) and began her approach. At 01:40, she launched three torpedoes and then another two in rapid succession. She then ducked her periscope and dove to avoid being rammed by the first target. The convoy passed overhead as Tunny dove deep in expectation of depth charges. She heard her torpedoes explode at the end of their run, but the absence of depth charges was both welcome and unexpected. Near dawn, Tunny made another attack, launching six torpedoes at ships of the convoy without success. Meanwhile, a destroyer escort had joined the convoy. Alerted to Tunny's presence, she now bore down on the submarine. Tunny dove, and, for the next two hours, the enemy ship remained overhead pinging and tracking. The destroyer escort dropped two patterns of six depth charges close by the submarine but finally gave up the search. At noon, Tunny came to periscope depth and, finding no sign of the convoy, set her course for Toagel Mlungui, securing from battle stations after an exhausting 15 hours.

At mid-morning on 26 August, she spotted two vessels escorted by submarine chaser CH-4 approaching Toagel Mlungui Pass and launched a five-torpedo attack. As Tunny dove, the screws of the first ship were heard to stop; and, shortly thereafter, two depth charges exploded overhead. Two minutes later, another pattern of depth charges exploded all around the submarine. A small fire broke out in the maneuvering room, causing main power to be lost momentarily. In order to check the fire, the main motors were stopped for one minute; then started again. Although the fire was small, dense smoke from burning insulating varnish made it difficult at first to assess the damage. Meanwhile, Tunny's bow planes jammed and the submarine climbed to 200 feet (60 m), then went into a steep glide which took her down to 380 feet (116 m) before control was regained. Within five minutes, coolly efficient damage control parties had restored operating conditions to nearly normal, and the submarine began her retirement to the southwest. Once again the sound of screws caused tense moments for those on board Tunny, but this time no depth charges fell.

Early that evening, Tunny surfaced and headed away from the heavily traveled lanes she had been patrolling in order to assess her damages and effect repairs. Inspection disclosed considerable damage to the bow, ripped-up plating aft of the torpedo room, and sheared-off rivets and bolts. The torpedo room pressure hull was badly dished in between frames; and this damage in turn immobilized the bow plane tilting gears. The explosions had jammed the gyro spindles in the stern torpedo tubes, impaired the usefulness of sound and radar gear, and caused other damage visible throughout the ship. Sailors inspecting topside found fragments of the destructive depth charges scattered over the deck.

For two days, her crew labored to restore her to order and make the necessary repairs. Having done everything within his means to restore Tunny to normal operating condition, her commanding officer found her still short of combat readiness. Her bow planes, despite all efforts, were still inoperative; her bow buoyancy tank unusable; and various other problems, which could not be remedied at sea, remained. Thus, on 29 August 1943, she departed her patrol area leaving these hunting grounds to other submarines in better condition. The war-scarred submarine moored at Pearl Harbor on 8 September.

=== Fifth war patrol (27 February – 11 April 1944) ===
After a preliminary assessment of battle damage, Tunny departed Pearl Harbor on 11 September 1943. She arrived at Hunters Point, San Francisco, California on 17 September for overhaul and repairs and remained there until 2 February 1944. Then, repairs and tests completed, she departed the West Coast. Tunny returned to Hawaii a week later, underwent voyage repairs and training, and departed Pearl Harbor for her fifth war patrol on 27 February.

Tunny stopped at Midway Atoll in the Northwestern Hawaiian Islands on 2 March, got underway the next day for the Palau Islands, and entered her patrol area on 15 March. On 20 March, a persistent observation plane kept Tunny down for three hours off the entrance to Toagel Mlungui and dropped eight light bombs without damaging the submarine. In the following days, the submarine patrolled the northern and western approaches to the islands.

On 22 March, Tunny's radar picked up what proved to be a large convoy. Day was breaking, and Tunny was maneuvering for a position ahead when an escorting destroyer appeared on the radar at 14,000 yards (13,000 m). The enemy soon sighted the submarine and challenged her with a blinker. Tunny took advantage of a nearby rain squall for concealment and continued to close the convoy, keeping a watchful eye on the destroyer. Despite bad visibility and the pinging of the escort, Tunny continued her approach and soon found herself in the midst of a group of tankers and cargo ships. Choosing two heavily loaded cargo ships for her targets, she launched a six-torpedo attack and heard or observed hits on both. Immediately, attention on board Tunny was diverted when a small tanker nearly collided with the submarine. Tunny now obtained a setup on a destroyer moving at high speed across her stern, fired four Mark 18 torpedoes, then dove quickly even as depth charges from a nearby trawler exploded on the port quarter. During the next four hours, the Japanese ships dropped 87 depth charges in an effort to finish off the submarine but without effect. Late in the day, Tunny surfaced and began a futile search for stragglers and cripples from the morning's attack. She found only debris and an oil slick.

At 21:19 on 23 March, while patrolling off Angaur Island, Tunny picked up a radar contact which she identified by sight as a large I-class submarine. For nearly an hour and a half, Tunny and the enemy submarine maneuvered for position, each attempting to prevent the other from obtaining a shot. Then, at 2324, Tunny launched four torpedoes from a range of 1,900 yards (1,700 m), swung hard to starboard to prevent a collision, and dove to avoid a possible return attack. Before the hatch was closed, two hits were heard and felt and a flash was seen inside Tunny's conning tower. For one terrible moment, observers on board Tunny feared that their own submarine had been hit. As Tunny dove to 150 feet (46 m) and began circling the area, the screws of the enemy submarine stopped, and a crackling racket began and continued for an hour. When the noise ceased, Tunny surfaced and cleared the area, but I-42 had met her end.

Tunny returned to waters off Toagel Mlungui and resumed patrols. On the morning of 29 March, she observed a large number of small vessels leaving Malakal Harbor, none worth an attack. Apparently, the enemy had somehow received word of the Fifth Fleet's impending bombing attack on Japanese installations in the Caroline Islands and made a desperate attempt to clear the area. Late in the afternoon, a larger formation appeared: the 63,000-ton battleship Musashi, the light cruiser Ōyodo, and three destroyers, also fleeing the expected aerial bombardment. After a daring approach, Tunny fired six torpedoes at the battleship from her bow tubes. The torpedoes passed directly under an alert destroyer of the screen which immediately hoisted flags to warn the battleship, swung parallel to the torpedo tracks, and made a run on the submarine. Tunny went deep and ran for the southwest while the destroyer dropped 38 depth charges in a short, but concentrated counterattack. One torpedo had found its mark on the battleship's bow, which caused flooding of the hydrophone compartment and 18 casualties. Toward sunset, the submarine lost contact with the formation. Later that night, she encountered what she thought to be the same force and was held down for two hours by one of the escorting ships. Hits by two of Tunny's torpedoes had damaged but failed to slow the powerful battleship. However, Musashi was still forced to return to port for repairs and upgrades, which kept her out of action for most of April.

At 02:00 on 30 March 1944, Tunny arrived on station to begin lifeguard duties for the Fifth Fleet's air attack on the Palau Islands. At 07:00, a series of explosions followed by the appearance of heavy smoke from the vicinity of the harbor indicated that American planes were finding their mark. During the morning, more than 100 planes passed over the submarine on their return from the strike. Then, as Tunny circled on station shortly after 12:00, two TBF Avenger torpedo bombers of U.S. Navy Torpedo Squadron 5 (VT-5) from the aircraft carrier USS Yorktown (CV-10) mistook her for a Japanese destroyer. and approached. One sheared off for a strafing attack which it did not complete; the other went into a steep glide and released a 2,000-pound (907 kg) bomb. from an altitude of 300 feet (91 m). Incredulous watchers on the submarine saw the bomb cross over the deck gun on the bow, pass the bridge at what appeared to be no more than arm's length, and strike the water with a tremendous impact, only 10 yards (9 m) to starboard of the forward engine room. The entire ship lifted with a snap as if it had collided with an underwater object, and an explosion followed some seconds later, throwing personnel and gear in all directions in the maneuvering and after torpedo rooms. Damage to the main control cubicle and to Tunny's remaining torpedoes resulted. Tunny completed repairs during the night, and the next morning manned her lifeguard station as before, only a little more wary of "friendly" aircraft.

Tunny departed the Palau Islands on 2 April, stopped at Milne Bay on 7 April, and arrived in Australia on 11 April. She received the Presidential Unit Citation for this patrol.

=== Sixth war patrol (29 April – 29 June 1944) ===
Following refit, the submarine departed Brisbane on 29 April and set her course for New Guinea. She underwent voyage repairs at Milne Bay, then proceeded via Langemak Bay to her patrol area in the Mariana Islands. She arrived in the patrol area on 11 May and, in the days that followed, encountered many enemy planes as she patrolled off Saipan and Guam.

On 17 May, she received a report from submarine Sand Lance (SS-381) of a convoy in the area and set out to intercept it. Late in the afternoon, she sighted the smoke of her quarry; and, just after sunset, the masts came into view. The convoy consisted of three cargo ships escorted by a like number of destroyers. Racing against fading twilight, Tunny made her approach; launched a spread of three torpedoes at the second ship of the column; then rapidly fired three more at the last cargo ship. Before the converging escorts forced her down, Tunny observed that a hit had left the last ship of the column down by the stern, emitting clouds of dense black smoke. Although the escorting vessels dropped 81 depth charges, none fell close, and Tunny withdrew to the southeast, having scored her sixth kill of the war, a 4900-ton cargo ship, the Nichiwa Maru. Shortly after midnight, Tunny surfaced and saw an ill-fated cargo ship, the victim of Sand Lance, ablaze from stem to stern. Frequent minor explosions punctuated the night as the ship went down in the darkness.

As Tunny continued patrols in the Mariana Islands, she sighted numerous aircraft and noted explosions and burning ships—apparently the work of sister ship Silversides (SS-236). At this time, however, planes attached to enemy convoys seemed effective in detecting Tunny and routing convoys around her, out of range of her torpedoes.

On 8 June, she rendezvoused with submarines Pilotfish (SS-386) and Pintado (SS-387) to form a coordinated attack group, the "Blair Blasters." The three submarines formed a scouting line for a patrol across the western Pacific to the South China Sea. Tunny passed through Balintang Channel on 14 June and sighted Luzon the next morning. While returning through Balintang Channel on 16 June, she made a surface approach on a small sampan and sank it with gunfire. She conducted patrols in the Philippine Sea until 22 June when she parted company with the attack group. On 29 June, she fueled at Midway Island; then proceeded to Oahu, having traveled over 14,500 nautical miles (26,900 km; 16,700 mi) on her sixth war patrol.

=== Seventh war patrol (4 August – 17 September 1944) ===
After refitting, she departed Pearl Harbor on 4 August 1944 as a member of a coordinated attack group or "wolfpack" called "Ed's Eradicators". With wolfpack members Barb (SS-220) and Queenfish (SS-393), she set her course, via Midway Island, for the South China Sea. She arrived in her patrol area on 25 August. Her first action came hours after midnight on 31 August when the wolfpack attacked a convoy. Queenfish was the first to score a hit, and Tunny witnessed the explosion of a tanker, the victim of her sister submarine. As Tunny maneuvered in the bright moonlight, she was suddenly startled by gunfire, which seemed to those on board to come from all directions. She dove and avoided damage from the depth charges which soon followed. Later on the same day, a hit by Barb alerted the convoy's air escort to Tunny's presence; and she was forced down again without opportunity to launch her torpedoes. Time after time, the submarine surfaced only to be forced down by escorting planes as the attack on the convoy continued into the evening.

A second disappointing day came on the heels of the first. Tunny patrolled submerged for most of 1 September in order to avoid enemy aircraft. Late in the afternoon, she was advancing westward on a scouting line formed by the wolf pack, when she sighted a plane dead ahead and about six miles (9.7 km) distant. She immediately began to dive, but 90 seconds later, as she passed 110 feet (34 m), two bombs hit close aboard aft, sending the ship upward at an eight degree angle and causing extensive damage. As the third and fourth bomb exploded, Tunny was already heading for 300 feet (91 m) to assess her damages.

Inspection disclosed that the bombs had dished in the hull plating in the vicinity of the after torpedo room and the maneuvering room, causing a leak in a vent riser. Less than ten minutes after the Japanese plane had been sighted, the commanding officer decided to discontinue the patrol. Throughout the ship, sheared off valves and bolts, damaged meters, clocks, and gauges attested to the force of the bomb's explosion. In addition, all three radio antennas were down, a leak in her pressure hull had been aggravated, and Tunny's rudder action indicated possible damage. She set her course for Balintang Channel and surfaced late in the day on 2 September. Tunny continued to sight Japanese airplanes as she made her way to Hawaii. She completed this patrol on 17 September at Pearl Harbor.

=== Eighth war patrol (3 February – 14 April 1945) ===
Tunny departed Oahu for California on 20 September and on 26 September she arrived at Hunter's Point for battle damage repairs and an overhaul. She returned to Hawaii in January 1945 and, after a training period departed Pearl Harbor on 3 February for her eighth war patrol.

On 14 February, she entered Tanapag Harbor and moored to submarine tender Fulton (AS-11) for repairs to her main engine. Later in the month, she conducted sonar tests out of that port. On 5 March, she departed Saipan and, in the days that followed, was slowed by heavy seas as she proceeded to her patrol area in the Ryukyu Islands.

On 13 March and 14 March, she conducted a special reconnaissance mission off the Nansei Shoto in preparation for landings planned for Okinawa on 1 April. On 14 March, Tunny plotted over 230 mines which she detected on sonar as she traveled through the hazardous waters at 150 feet (46 m). On 15 March, all hands breathed a sigh of relief as Tunny got underway for her patrol area, her special mission safely and successfully completed.

Her pursuit of a distant convoy ended in disappointment on 18 March, when a change of course allowed the cargo ships and their escort to slip away from Tunny around sunset. For two days, the submarine patrolled off Amami Ōshima; then, on 23 March, she took up a lifeguard station. Days later, as Tunny searched for a downed flier, a twin-float enemy plane took her by surprise and dropped two bombs. One fell quite close but caused only minor damage to the submarine. As the month drew to its close, Tunny rescued two fliers from aircraft carrier Intrepid (CV-11) and one from Bennington (CV-20) as those ships took part in the assault on Okinawa.

On 1 April, Tunny completed her lifeguard duties and set her course for Midway Island. En route, she sank a 200-ton lugger with her deck gun. After stopping at Midway Island, she arrived at Oahu on 14 April.

=== Ninth (last) war patrol (14 May – 6 July 1945) ===
Following refitting and a week of sonar and approach training, Tunny departed Pearl Harbor on 14 May for her ninth war patrol. She stopped at Guam for repairs and additional sonar exercises, then got underway on 28 May. Together with submarines Skate (SS-305) and Bonefish (SS-223), Tunny formed the second group of "Hydeman's Hellcats" known as "Pierce's Polecats." On 2 June, Tunny passed through the Nansei Shoto and, as she approached Kyūshū two days later, encountered increasing small boat traffic. On 5 June, Tunny passed through Korea Strait, repeating the hair-raising task of mine detection by sonar, this time in Nishi Suido. She plotted over 80 mines; then continued on to conduct patrols on the western shore of Honshū.

Operating in the supposedly inviolable waters of the Sea of Japan, the wolf pack attacked shipping and made exploratory attempts to enter Japanese harbors. Late on 9 June, Tunny attacked a cargo vessel. One torpedo hit the enemy vessel with a thud but failed to explode, and Tunny discontinued the attack. In the harbor entering phase of the patrol, Tunny closed the breakwater of Etomo Ko to 8,000 yards (7.3 km) shortly before midnight on 12 June. Town and waterfront lights provided illumination, but no suitable target could be found, and the submarine cleared the harbor before midnight. A few minutes later, Tunny approached within 5,000 yards (5,000 m) of the harbor mouth at Uppuri Wan but discreetly withdrew when searchlights located and then brilliantly illuminated the intruder.

On 16 June, Tunny sighted numerous rafts filled with the Japanese survivors of a successful action by Bonefish and later took prisoner a Japanese chief petty officer who had escaped from the sinking ship. On the following day, as Tunny and Bonefish closed a radar-located target, Tunny suddenly found herself the object of gunfire, with the closest shot falling only 200 yards (200 m) off her port beam. She quickly changed course and eluded both the gunfire and the depth charges which followed. On 19 June, shallow coastal water foiled Tunny's attack on a 4,000-ton cargo ship.

Tunny rendezvoused with Skate on 23 June to depart the Sea of Japan. She remained off Hokkaidō for two days on the chance that she might be able to aid Bonefish, missing since her request to make a daylight submerged patrol of Toyama Wan some days earlier. On 27 June, Tunny discontinued her vigil; proceeded via the Kuril Islands and Midway Island; and arrived at Pearl Harbor on 6 July.

The submarine then made her way back to the west coast. Tunny was decommissioned on 13 December 1945 and placed in the Mare Island Group, 19th Fleet.

== Post-war missile testing and deterrent patrols ==
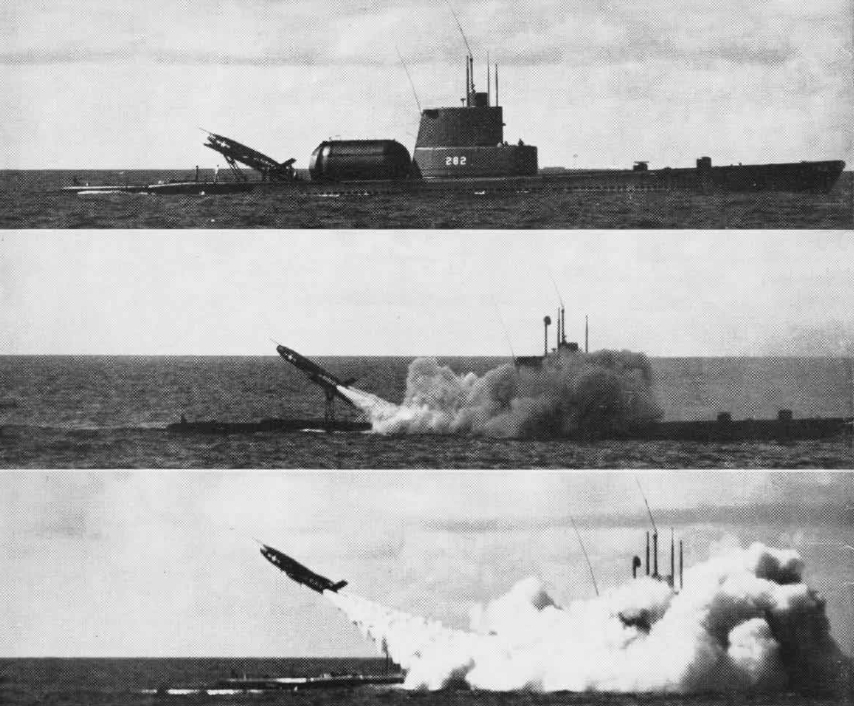
Tunny fires a Regulus I missile

The war in Korea placed new demands on the resources of the Navy and led to Tunny's being placed in commission, in reserve, on 28 February 1952. She saw no service at this time, however, and was decommissioned in April 1952. On 6 March 1953, she was placed in commission for the third time. Converted to carry guided missiles under project SCB 28, she was reclassified as SSG-282 and was armed with the Regulus I nuclear cruise missile for nearly 12 years. In this role, Tunny was equipped with a hangar housing two missiles and a launcher on the after deck. One of the limitations of Regulus was that the firing submarine had to surface, the missile then being rolled out onto the launcher and fired. Regulus I also required guidance from submarines or other platforms after firing. In 1955, a second World War II submarine, USS Barbero, was also converted to fire Regulus I.

For the first four of those years she operated out of Port Hueneme, contributing to the development of the Regulus missile system. Except for a short period of type training, Tunny engaged entirely in the launching and guidance of Regulus missiles for purposes of missile evaluation in the development of the system. In 1957, she shifted her base of operations to Pearl Harbor, Hawaii, bringing Regulus to initial operational capability, where she conducted the first submarine deterrent patrols and fired exercise missiles.

== Vietnam operations ==
In May 1965, the Regulus missile system was phased out, having been superseded by the Polaris missile, and Tunny was redesignated with hull classification symbol SS-282. She remained in the Hawaiian operating area until the end of the year, conducting training exercises and providing various other services. In 1966, she was converted to a troop-carrying submarine and redesignated with hull classification symbol APSS-282, being re-equipped with a deck shelter for small amphibious vehicles and other equipment. In February 1967, Tunny began missions in unconventional warfare, operating off the coast of Vietnam. She conducted reconnaissance in preparation for amphibious assault operations and gathered navigational and oceanographic information. Ideally suited for transporting small teams for specialized operations as well as for gathering information, she participated in Operation Deckhouse VI.

On 1 January 1968, the veteran submarine was reclassified LPSS-282. She was decommissioned on 28 June 1969, and, on 30 June 1969, her name was struck from the Naval Vessel Register. She was sunk as a target on 19 June 1970.

== Awards ==
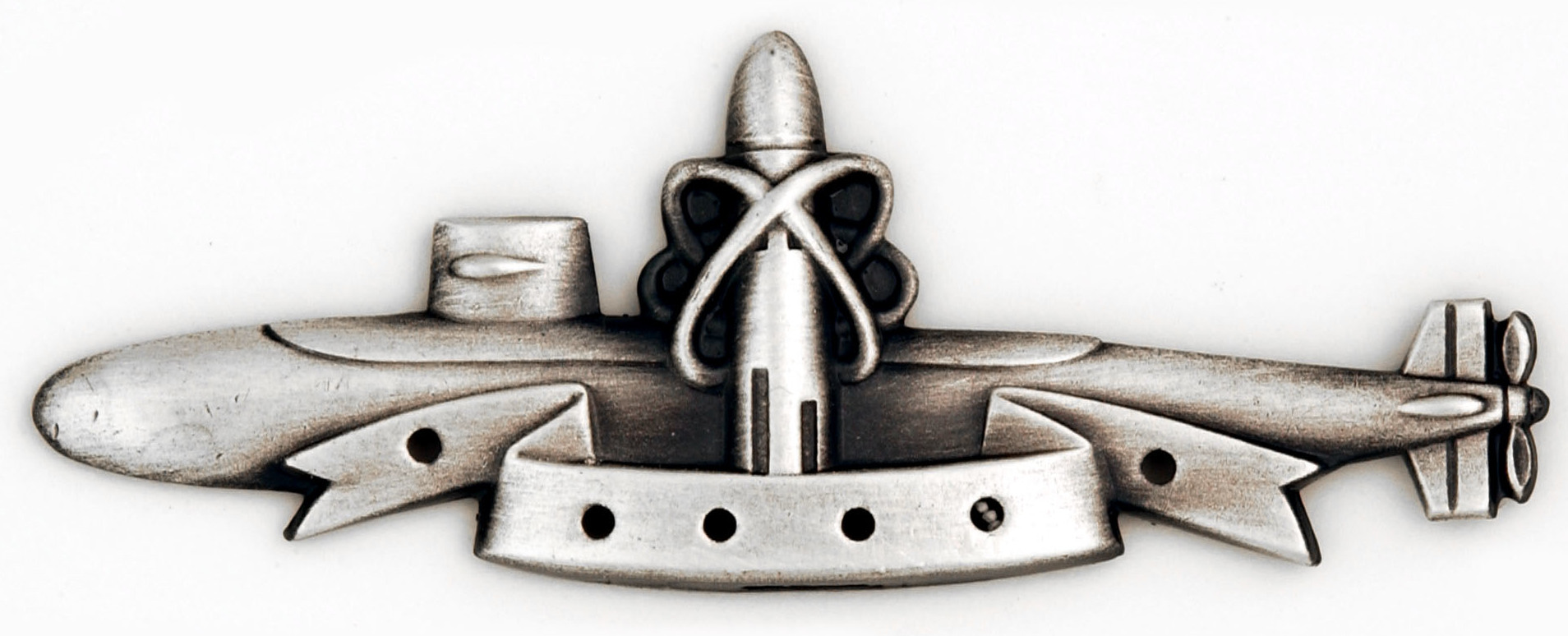

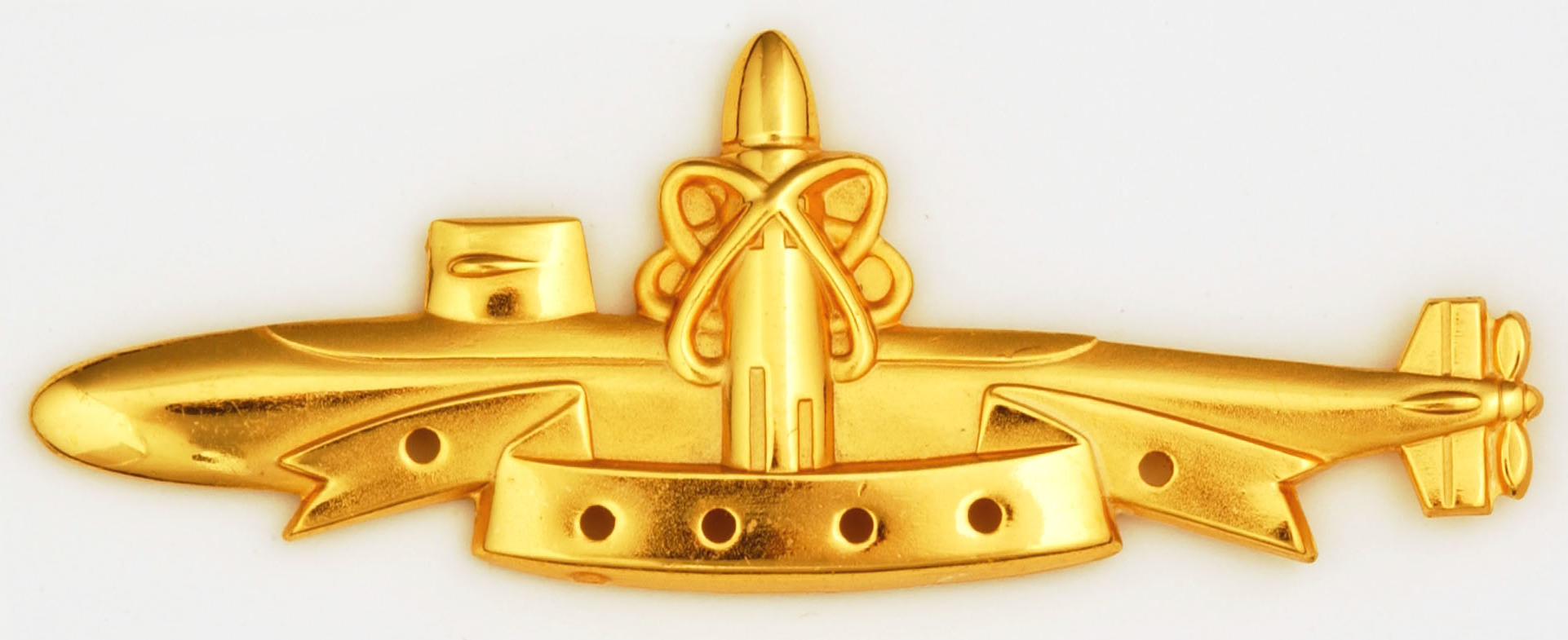
Crewmen that served aboard Tunny and conducted strategic deterrent patrols were permitted to wear the SSBN Deterrent Patrol insignia from 1997. Crew of Tunny are permitted to wear the silver insignia and have one silver star and three gold stars, representing a total of nine successful patrols

Presidential Unit Citation
| Meritorious Unit Commendation | Asiatic–Pacific Campaign Medal with nine battle stars | World War II Victory Medal |
| National Defense Service Medal with one star | Vietnam Service Medal with five campaign stars | Republic of Vietnam; Campaign Medal |

In April 1997, officers and men of Tunny and the other four US Navy submarines that conducted strategic deterrent patrols in the Western Pacific between 1959 and 1964 were awarded the right to wear the Navy's SSBN Deterrent Patrol insignia. Tunny conducted eleven deterrent patrols.
