= Coromandel (1793 ship) =

History

Great Britain
- Name: Modeste
- Namesake: Coromandel Coast
- Owner: Hogg, Davidson, and Co., or Reeve & Co.; 1809:W. Gordon
- Acquired: 1793
- Renamed: Coromandel
- Fate: Foundered 1821
- Notes: Teak-built

General characteristics
- Tons burthen: 500, or 503, or 515, or 522, or 52222/94bm)
- Length: 125 ft 0 1/2 in (38.1 m) (overall)
- Beam: 32 ft 0 in (9.8 m)
- Depth of hold: 16 ft 0 in (4.9 m)
- Propulsion: Sail
- Complement: 47
- Armament: 1800:4 × 9-pounder guns; 1802:8 × 9-pounder guns + 6 × 12-pounder guns "of the New Construction"; 1803:14 × 9 and 6-pounder guns
- Notes: Teak-built

Coromandel was the French prize Modeste, captured in 1793 and refitted at Chittagong, British India (now Bangladesh). She made two voyages transporting convicts to Port Jackson, the first for the British East India Company (EIC). A French privateer captured her in 1805, but she had returned to British hands before 1809. An American privateer captured her in 1814, but this time the British Royal Navy recaptured her within days. She foundered in Indian waters on 6 February 1821.

== Career ==
Coromandel first appeared in Lloyd's Register (LR) in 1800 with A. Sterling, master, Reeve & Co., owners, and trade London–Cape of Good Hope (CGH).

Year	Master	Owner	Trade	Source & notes
1802	A. Sterling	Reeve & Co.	London–CGH; London–Botany Bay	Register of Shipping; damages repaired 1801

=== Convict transport ===
On her first voyage transporting convicts, under the command of Alex Sterling (or Stirling), she sailed from Portsmouth, England on 8 February 1802, and Spithead, on 12 February, in company with, Perseus and arrived at Port Jackson on 13 June 1802. Coromandel transported 138 male convicts, one of whom died on the voyage.

Coromandel left Port Jackson on 22 July bound for China. On the way she sighted the islands of Nama, Losap, Murilo, and Nomwin in the area of Truk.

She arrived at Whampoa anchorage on 17 September. From there she sailed to "Capshee Bay", which she reached on 12 October, before she returned to Whampoa on 21 November. She left in company with Hercules, and on 5 January 1803, Coromandel was at Lintin Island. From there she sailed to St Helena, which she reached on 17 April, and then on to Long Reach, arriving back in Britain on 14 June.

The LR for 1803 showed her master as changing from Sterling to Robinson. It reported that she had damages repaired in 1802, and that her trade was London–Botany Bay.

On her second voyage, she was under the command of John Robinson. The Napoleonic Wars had commenced so Robinson applied for and received a letter of marque on 16 September 1803. Coromandel sailed from England on 4 December 1803, with 200 male convicts, and 32 officers and men of the New South Wales Corps, who provided the guards. She left in company with Experiment. While sailing in the Bay of Biscay Experiment suffered damage during a gale and had to limp back to Cowes for repairs. Robinson died off St. Salvador, and George Blakely took over command. Coromandel arrived at Port Jackson on 7 May 1804. No convicts died during the voyage.

Coromandel left Port Jackson on 10 July bound for China.

=== French capture ===
The French privateer Henriette captured Coromandel on 15 March 1805, as she was sailing from China to London, and sent her into Mauritius. The EIC put the value of the cargo lost when the French captured her at £35,768.

By 1809, Coromandel was back in British hands with William Linton, master, and W. Gordon, owner. The question of how she returned to British control and ownership is currently obscure. (Note: One report states that the British recaptured her on 3 December 1810, following their invasion of Isle de France, and returned her to her owners. However, not only is she not listed among the vessels the British captured there, but she was already in British hands by then.)

For the invasions of Île Bourbon and Île de France (Mauritius) in 1810-1811 the British government hired a number of transport vessels. Coromandel was among them.

Coromandel, Hogue, Davidson, & Co., owners, appeared on a list of vessels registered at Calcutta in January 1811.

=== Misadventures ===
There was a Coromandel that was reported to have been totally lost in the Carimata Passage, together with Abercrombie, the first coming from Bengal bound for Batavia and the second from Bombay to China. (Note: Abercrombie was a new ship of 1200 tons (bm), out of Bombay. The account that describes Abercrombie is a listing of vessels that were wrecked in the Carimata passage and does not include Coromandel.) Apparently Coromandel was badly stranded in the Karimata Passage in 1812, but salved and repaired.

=== American capture ===
The next notable event occurred on 2 August 1814. The American privateer schooner York (or Yorktown), captured Coromandel, a "country ship" of 500 tons (bm), as she was sailing from Batavia to London. (Note: An American source gives the captor as the 14-gun and 120 ton (bm) schooner York, E. Staples, master. Apparently Coromandel was armed with only two guns and had a crew of 66 men. Another U.S. source gives the British ship's name as Carondolet, as well as Coromandel. The source further states that York, of Baltimore, had divested her prey of 30 tons of coffee and sugar, as well as silks and other valuable goods. Yorkhad arrived safely at Boston on 6 October.) Lloyd's List reported that Coromandel, Cameron, master, from St Helena, was missing from "the Fleet" on 13 August. HMS Eridanus recaptured Coromandel on the 12th. Coromandel arrived at Plymouth on 16 August 1814. (Note: A first-class share of the prize-money was worth £788 19s 2d; a sixth-class share, that of an ordinary seaman, was worth £7 13s.)

=== Ongoing service ===
On 12 January 1816 Coromandel stopped at the Cape on her way to Madras and Bengal; she was still under Cameron's command.

What connects this Coromandel with that of the voyages to Australia is that a Coromandel appeared in the Lloyd's Register (LR) for 1818 and 1819. LR described her as a teak-built vessel of 503 tons (bm), launched in 1793 in the East Indies. Her master was "A. Cameron", her owner was "Campbell", and her trade was London to India. (Note: This last means that her port of registry was now London, which may explain why she did not appear in earlier issues of LR.)

== Fate ==
Coromandel foundered on 6 February 1821. Coromandel, W. Butler, master, was sailing for Malacca when her crew had to abandon her off the coast of Borneo as she was in a sinking state. The crew took to three boats and all were saved. Butler and 39 officers and men arrived at "Kemanlie", the second boat with an officer and 12 men arrived at Sourabaya, and the third boat arrived at Samarang.
