= Japanese Lighthouse =

Japanese Lighthouse may refer to:

- Japanese Lighthouse (Micronesia), listed on the United States National Register of Historic Places in Chuuk, Federated States of Micronesia
- Japanese Lighthouse (Northern Mariana Islands), listed on the U.S. National Register of Historic Places in Saipan, Northern Mariana Islands
