= VP-133 =

Patrol Squadron 133
- Active: 22 March 1943 – 17 June 1946
- Country: United States
- Branch: United States Navy
- Type: squadron
- Role: Maritime patrol
- Engagements: World War II

Aircraft flown
- Patrol: PV-1; PV-2

VP-133 was a Patrol Squadron of the U.S. Navy. The squadron was established as Bombing Squadron 133 (VB-133) on 22 March 1943, redesignated Patrol Bombing Squadron 133 (VPB-133) on 1 October 1944, redesignated Patrol Squadron 133 (VP-133) on 15 May 1946 and disestablished on 17 June 1946.

== Operational history ==
- 22 March – 29 June 1943: VB-133 was established at NAS DeLand, Florida as a medium bombing squadron flying the PV-1 Ventura. During the period of initial ground training the squadron came under the operational control of FAW-12. On 29 June the squadron completed training at NAS DeLand and relocated to NAAF Boca Chica, Florida for shakedown training in Anti-submarine warfare (ASW).
- 19 July 1943: VB-133 was transferred to NS San Juan, Puerto Rico for duty as convoy escort and ASW patrols, coming under the operational control of FAW-11. On the 29th, a detachment of three aircraft was sent to NAF Hato Field, Curaçao under Commander All Forces, Aruba-Curaçao to conduct convoy coverage in cooperation with the Army. On 1 August, this detachment was increased to six aircraft.
- 24 July 1943: Lieutenant R. B. Johnson investigated a submarine sighting made by a Pan American Airways aircraft. He successfully located the U-boat on the surface and made a bombing run. In the excitement Johnson neglected to open the bomb bay doors, forcing him to make a second pass on the now submerging U-boat. His salvo of six Depth charges straddled the submarine and he was credited with a probable, but postwar records indicate no losses by the German navy at that location on that date.
- 1 October 1943: The squadron was ordered to join the detachment at NAF Hato Field, coming under CAFAC operational control. On 15 November, a detachment of three aircraft was sent to NAAF Atkinson Field, Essequibo, British Guiana.
- 28 October 1943: A series of 42 engine failures during the deployment to date caused the commanding officer to order all aircraft grounded until the HEDRON could remedy the problems associated with the frequent failures. The Ventura was a new aircraft to the HEDRON at that time and was still experiencing many teething problems during operations. The ignition systems proved to be the culprit, and repairs were made that put the squadron back into action by 1 November.
- 8 November 1943: Lieutenant Commander William C. Murphy, the squadron commanding officer, spotted a U-boat on the surface near San Juan. During his depth charge attack the submarine remained surfaced and put up a barrage of intense anti-aircraft (AA) fire. Murphy's aircraft received four 20-mm hits that damaged his port engine. He was able to fly 90 miles (140 km) back to base without further incident. German records did not indicate any damage to the submarine as a result of the attack.
- 15 November 1943: The squadron was relocated to NAAF Edinburgh Field, Trinidad, with a detachment of three aircraft remaining at Atkinson Field. On 15 December, the detachment rejoined the squadron at Trinidad, and a six-aircraft detachment was sent to Curaçao.
- 1 February 1944: The Curaçaoo detachment rejoined the squadron at Trinidad and the entire squadron began a period of intensive training in low level bombing and strafing.
- 16 April 1944: VB-133 was relieved for return to NAS Norfolk, Virginia. Upon arrival, all hands were given rehabilitation leave.
- 4 May 1944: VB-133 was reformed at NAS Alameda, California, under the operational control of FAW-8. Two days later, the squadron was relocated to NAF Crows Landing, California, for intensive ground and flight training. The aircraft complement of the squadron was increased from 12 to 15 at that time. The training concluded on 15 June 1944 and the squadron was sent back to NAS Alameda to prepare for its deployment to the South Pacific.
- 27 June 1944: VB-133 departed San Francisco, aboard USS Independence, arriving at Naval Base Pearl Harbor, Hawaii, on 4 July 1944. The squadron aircraft and personnel were quickly unloaded and flown the next day to NAS Kaneohe, coming under the operational control of FAW-2. An intensive period of operational and combat training was conducted through the end of August with emphasis on glide bombing, rocket firing and ASW.
- 14 July – 5 August 1944: VB-133 sent a three-aircraft detachment to Johnston Atoll for search and reconnaissance patrols.
- 4 September 1944 – February 1945: VB-133 was transferred to NAB Roi, Marshall Islands, to relieve VB-144. Long-range search sectors were carried out over the northern approaches to the island. On 25 October, the squadron participated in combat missions against enemy positions on Wake Island. Through the end of February 1945, the squadron conducted raids against Wake, Nauru and other neutralized Japanese-held island bases. Daily reconnaissance flights and searches were made over the Kusaie island group.
- 5 March 1945: VPB-133 was transferred to NAB Tinian to relieve VPB-150, coming under the operational control of FAW-1. The squadron flew 400 miles (640 km) sector searches to the west and southwest of Tinian and conducted frequent reconnaissance flights to Woleai, Poluwat and Lamotrek islands in the Caroline island group.
- 23 March 1945: A detachment of six aircraft was sent to Iwo Jima to spearhead attacks against Japanese picket boats guarding the approaches to the home islands. The heavily armed picket boats served as Japan's early warning system to give the Japanese air defense command notice of incoming raids by B-29 aircraft. Lieutenant (jg) Wilson was the first squadron pilot to tangle with these vessels, sinking one and damaging another. Both he and his co-pilot, Ensign McCarthy, were so badly wounded by AA fire in the attack that the plane captain, AMM1c Henry M. Sandler, had to take over the controls and fly the damaged Ventura back to Iwo Jima. The first detachment was relieved on the 27th by a second detachment, then returned again on the 31st.
- 31 March 1945: Lieutenant Commander Elwyn L. Christman, the squadron commanding officer, was killed in an accident at Iwo Jima. An Army P-51 Mustang landing on the strip at Iwo Jima lost control, veering into the edge of number two landing strip. Christman was standing with a group of the squadron officers as the Mustang approached. The group sought cover behind a truck, but the Mustang struck and overturned the vehicle. Christman was the only casualty in the incident, aside from the pilot of the Mustang who was burned to death in the aircraft.
- 30 April 1945: A four aircraft strike was made against Truk island and a seven aircraft raid was made against Woleai.
- 8–30 May 1945: Ten of the squadron aircraft were sent to Iwo Jima for search and patrol operations, reconnaissance missions and strikes against enemy shipping. On 27 May, Lieutenant Paul Schenk flew a patrol to Shionomisaki, a heavily defended region along the coast of Japan. He and his crew failed to return and were presumed lost. On the same day, Lieutenant (jg) Phillips, while on patrol along the coast of Japan, called to report the loss of an engine. He indicated no other difficulties and proceeded homeward toward Iwo Jima. His last voice contact was from a position approximately 300 miles (480 km) from Iwo Jima. He and crew were also listed as missing. A third crew on patrol on the 27th, piloted by Lieutenant Commander Coley, was more fortunate. After sustaining severe damage during an attack on a Japanese vessel, Coley was forced to ditch the aircraft near a lifeguard submarine about 300 miles (480 km) northeast of Iwo Jima. The crew was picked up without injury and returned to duty five days later. A few days later, Lieutenant Wooten and his crew were able to duplicate Lieutenant Commander Coley's feat, by ditching near USS Cummings only 30 miles (48 km) from Iwo Jima.
- 3–15 June 1945: All squadron aircraft returned to Tinian from duty at Iwo Jima. Through mid-July routine white cap patrols were conducted, with occasional strikes against Alet, Poluwat, Woleai and Lamotrek islands in the Carolines. On the 15th, a detachment of four crews and three aircraft was sent to Peleliu Airfield to fly routine day patrols and night ASW patrols. Also at that time the squadron received am NE-1 Grasshopper for mail runs and general utility work around the islands.
- 10 August 1945: With the stand down notice of the pending Surrender of Japan, flight activity diminished. With the signing of the surrender in September, all patrols were discontinued. The commanding officer of the squadron, Lieutenant Commander Flannery, and his crew flew to NAB Yontan, Okinawa, to pick up a Ventura fitted out with powerful loudspeakers. This aircraft was flown by the squadron on frequent hops during the next few months over Japanese-held islands accompanied by Japanese language officers, spreading the word that the war had ended and directing enemy troops to come in and surrender.
- May 1946: The squadron completed its six months of operations with FAW-1 at Yonabaru Airfield, Okinawa and returned to NAS San Diego to prepare for formal disestablishment on 17 June 1946.

== Aircraft assignments ==
The squadron was assigned the following aircraft, effective on the dates shown:

- PV-1 – March 1943
- PV-2 – 1946

== Home port assignments ==
The squadron was assigned to these home ports, effective on the dates shown:

- NAS DeLand, Florida – 22 March 1943
- NAAF Boca Chica, Florida – 29 June 1943
- NS San Juan, Puerto Rico – 19 July 1943
- NAF Hato Field, Curaçao, N.W.I. – 1 October 1943
- NAAF Edinburgh Field, Trinidad, B.W.I. – 15 November 1943
- NAS Norfolk, Virginia – April 1944
- NAS Alameda, California – 4 May 1944
- NAS Kaneohe Bay, Hawaii – 5 July 1944
- Yonabaru Airfield, Okinawa – late 1945
- NAS San Diego, California – May 1946

== See also ==
- Maritime patrol aircraft
- List of inactive United States Navy aircraft squadrons
- List of United States Navy aircraft squadrons
- List of squadrons in the Dictionary of American Naval Aviation Squadrons
- History of the United States Navy
