= Ruo, Federated States of Micronesia =

Municipality in Chuuk State

Coordinates: 8.6095°N 152.2407°E

Ruo
- Municipality
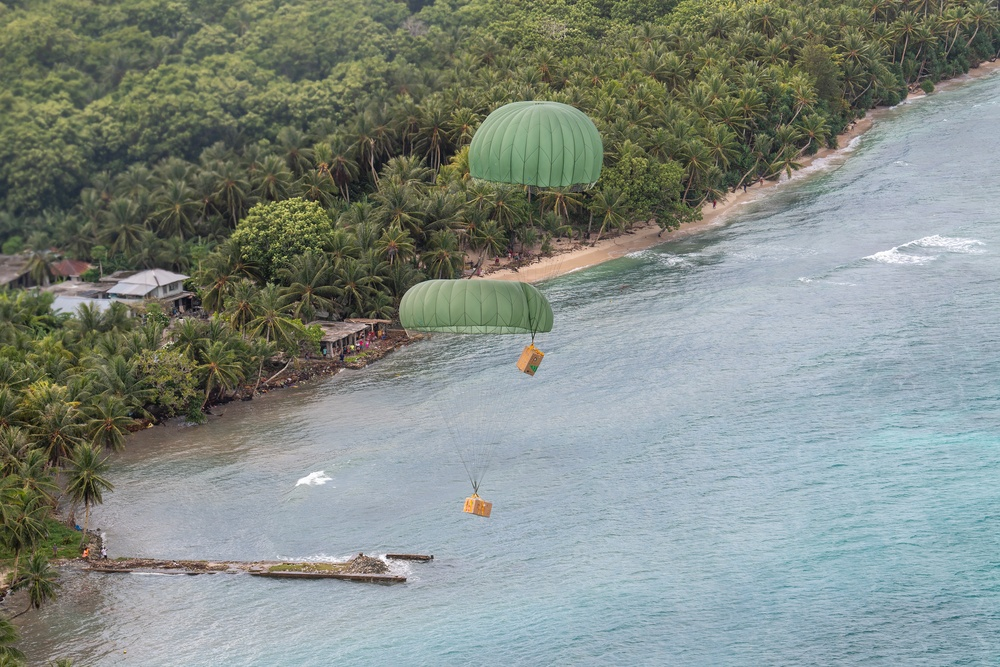
- The shoreline of Ruo
- Interactive map of Ruo
- Country: Federated States of Micronesia
- State: Chuuk State

Area
  - Land: 0.42 km^{2} (0.16 sq mi)

Population (2010)
  - Total: 241
- Time zone: UTC+10

Ruo is an island of Murilo Atoll in the Hall Islands and a municipality in the state of Chuuk, Federated States of Micronesia.
