= Makur, Chuuk =

Municipality in Chuuk State, Federal States of Micronesia

Coordinates: 8.9837°N 150.1282°E

Makur
- Municipality
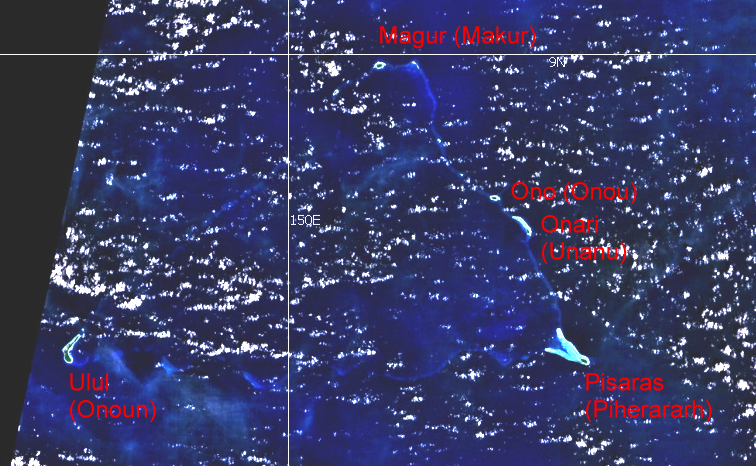
- NASA WorldWind screenshot of Namonuito Atoll showing Makur's location
- Interactive map of Makur
- Country: Federated States of Micronesia
- State: Chuuk State

Area
  - Land: 0.62 km^{2} (0.24 sq mi)

Population (2010)
  - Total: 159
- Time zone: UTC+10

Makur, also known as Magur, is a municipality in the state of Chuuk, Federated States of Micronesia, located in the north of Namonuito Atoll. It has been known as an "island of hunger", meaning poor and low in population, a term applied to Tamatam and the other islands of Namonuito sans Onoun.

== History ==
In oral tradition Makur has a history of conflict with Polowat, an atoll in the Pattiw group. Its people had repeatedly defeated the Polowatese until the war initiated by Lukupun. A Polowatese resident of Namoluk, Lukupun was dissatisfied with his homeland's failures in fighting Makur and so he travelled to Pattiw to receive the backing of the chief of Polowat and raise a war party. His forces, split into two, attacked Makur from both sides and succeeded, resulting in the execution of the Makur chief Sewan. A pre-1880s attack on Makur by Pattiw forces was responsible for a chain of events leading to the depopulation of Onoun, another island of Namonuito.

== Demographics ==
=== Population change ===
Historical population
Year	Pop.
1909	≈10
1967	50
1973	66
1975	76
1980	97
1989	121
2010	159
Source: Gorenflo, Larry J. (1995). "Regional demographic change in Chuuk State, Federated States of Micronesia". Pacific Studies Journal. 18 (3) 6. BYUH Digital Collections.; "Chuuk Basic Tabulation - 2010 Census of Population and Housing". Federated States of Micronesia Division of Statistics.
