= Onou =

Island and municipality in the state of Chuuk, Federated States of Micronesia

Coordinates: 8.798°N 150.292°E

- Municipality
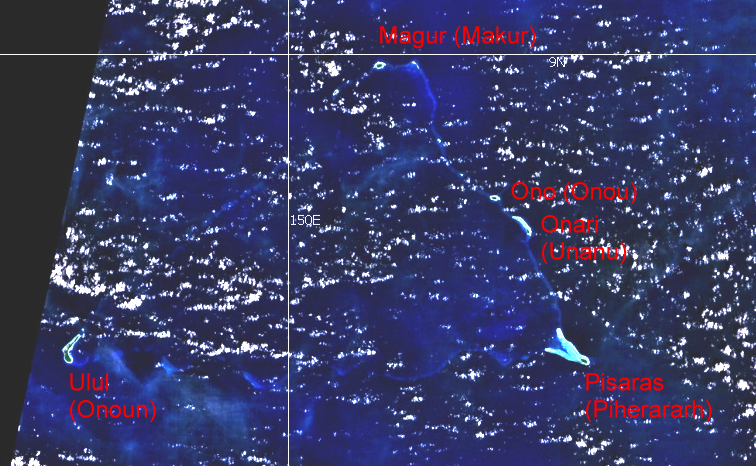
- NASA WorldWind screenshot of Namonuito Atoll showing Onou's location
- Interactive map of Onou
- Country: Federated States of Micronesia
- State: Chuuk State

Area
  - Land: 0.27 km^{2} (0.10 sq mi)

Population (2010)
  - Total: 172
- Time zone: UTC+10

Onou, also known as Ono, is an island in the east of Namonuito Atoll and municipality in the state of Chuuk, Federated States of Micronesia. It has about 192 residents.
