= Piherarh =

Municipality in Chuuk State, Federal States of Micronesia

Coordinates: 8.5698°N 150.4191°E

- Municipality
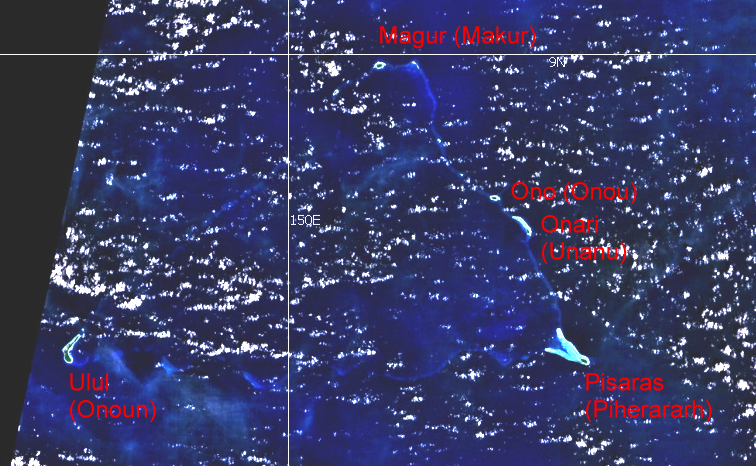
- NASA WorldWind screenshot of Namonuito Atoll showing Piherarh's location
- Interactive map of Piherarh
- Country: Federated States of Micronesia
- State: Chuuk State

Area
  - Land: 0.5 km^{2} (0.19 sq mi)

Population (2010)
  - Total: 227
- Time zone: UTC+10

Piherarh, also known as Pisaras, is the easternmost island of Namonuito Atoll and a municipality in the state of Chuuk, Federated States of Micronesia. Islets within the municipality include Wabonoru, Pielimal and Weltot.
