= Unanu =

Island in Chuuk State, Federal States of Micronesia

Coordinates: 8.7536°N 150.3393°E

- Municipality
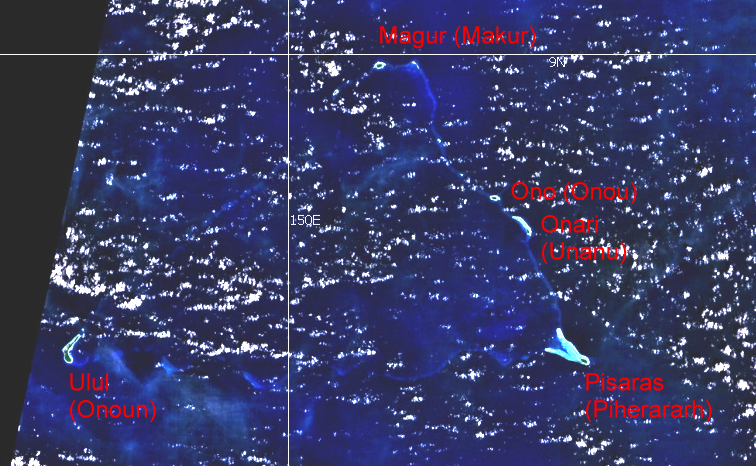
- NASA WorldWind screenshot of Namonuito Atoll showing Unanu's location
- Interactive map of Unanu
- Country: Federated States of Micronesia
- State: Chuuk State

Area
  - Land: 0.26 km^{2} (0.10 sq mi)

Population (2010)
  - Total: 193
- Time zone: UTC+10

Unanu, also known as Onari, is an island in the east of Namonuito Atoll and a municipality in the state of Chuuk, Federated States of Micronesia. It is located 8°45'12.4"N 150°20'20.5"E.
