= Nomwin =

Island in Chuuk State, Federal States of Micronesia

Coordinates: 8.4313°N 151.7466°E

Location of Nomwin in Chuuk State, Federated States of Micronesia

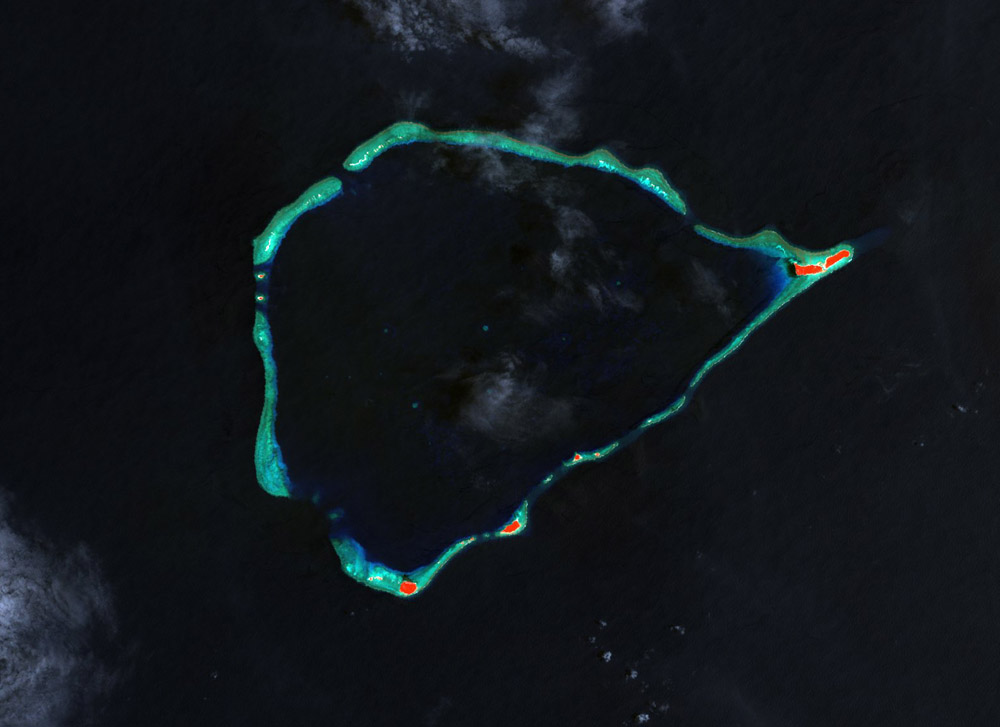
Landsat picture of Nomwin Atoll

Nomwin is a large atoll, part of the Hall Islands, as well as a village and municipality (together with uninhabited East Fayu) in the state of Chuuk, Federated States of Micronesia.

It is located 9 km to the SW of Murilo Atoll and 82 km to the north of Chuuk Lagoon. Together with Murilo, Fananu, and Ruo, they form the Hall Islands.

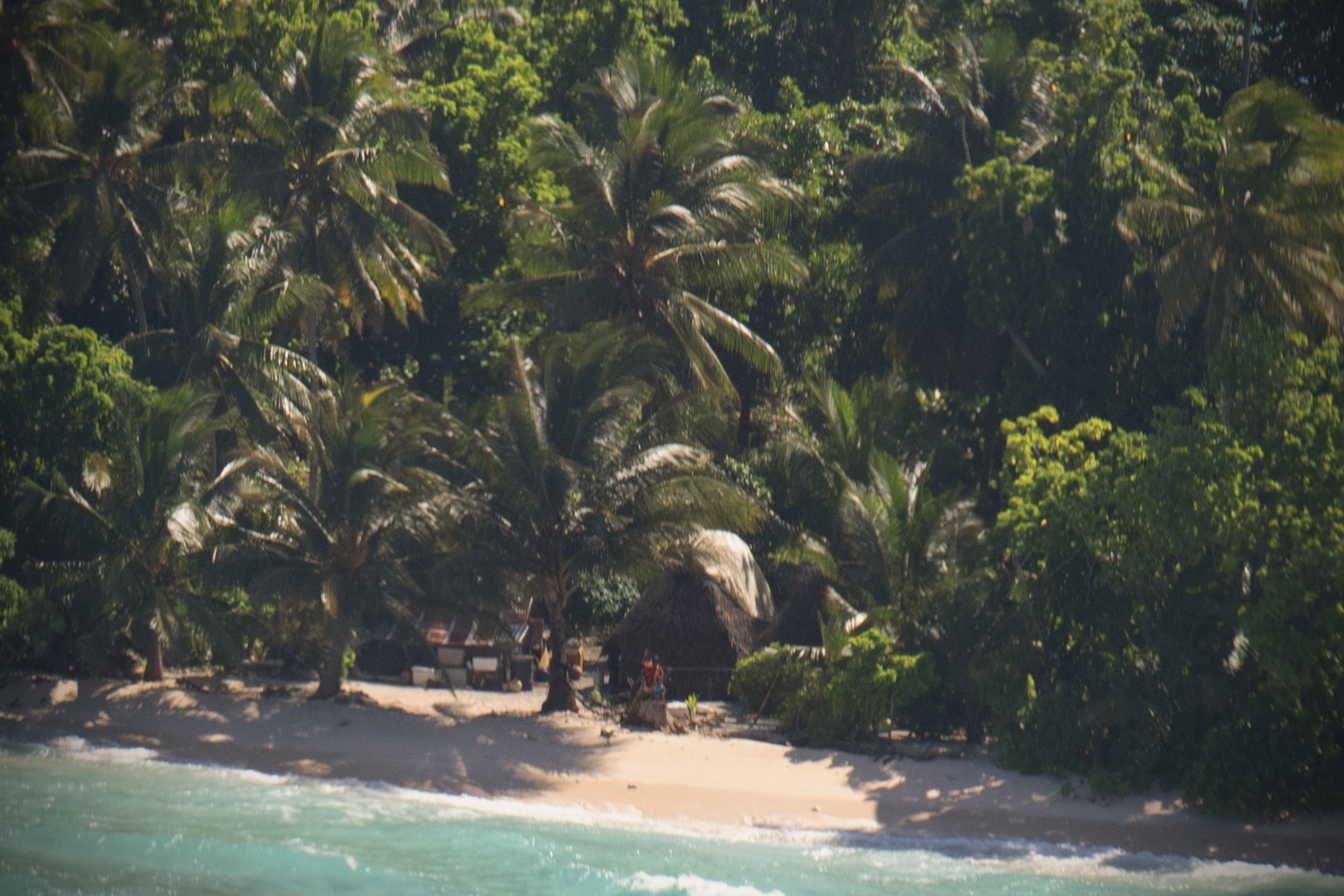
Buildings and residents on Nomwin Atoll
