= Japanese Lighthouse (Northern Mariana Islands) =

Lighthouse of Northern Mariana Islands

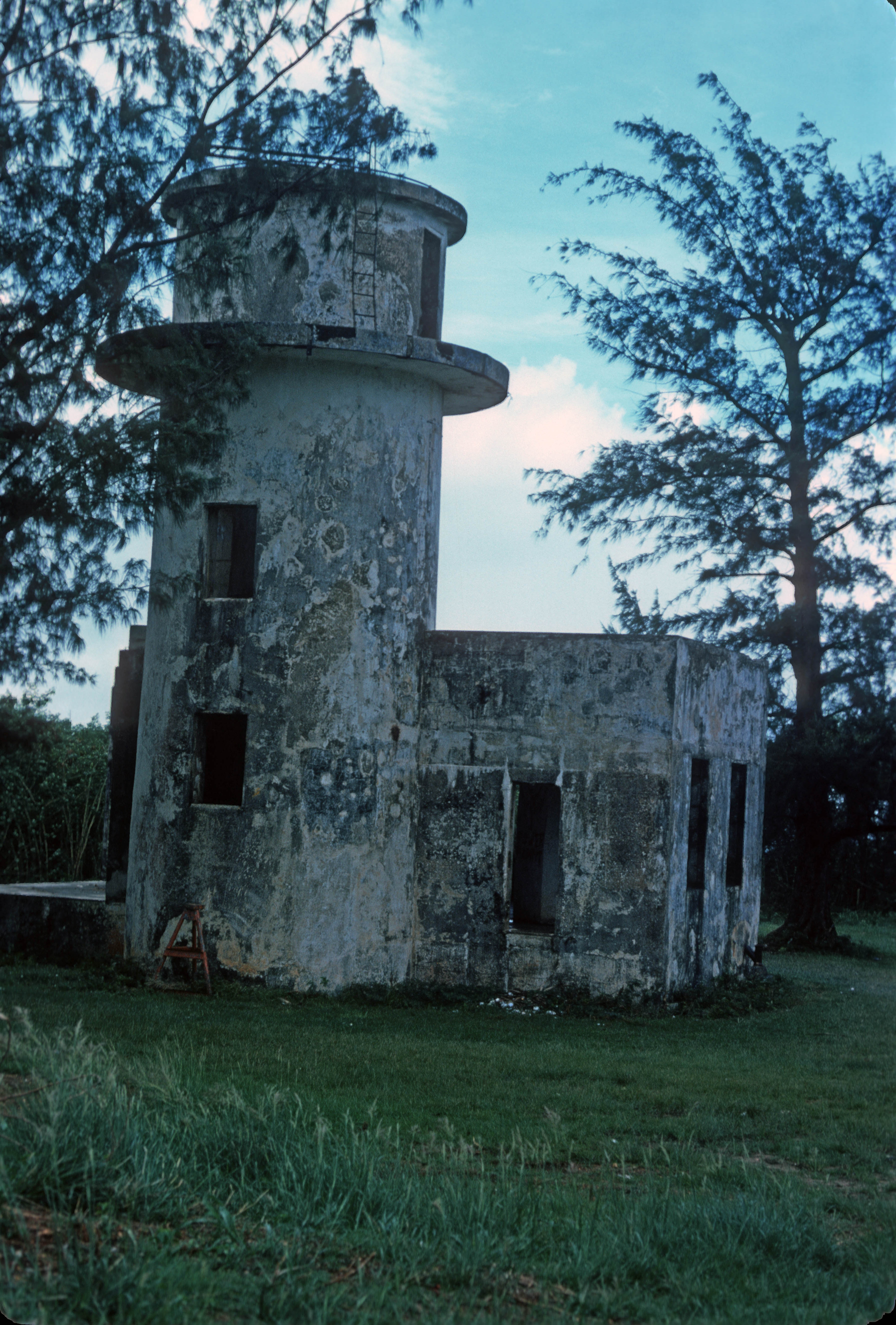
- The lighthouse before 1990
- Location: Navy Hill; Garapan; Saipan; Northern Mariana Islands
- Coordinates: 15°12′42.3″N 145°43′53.9″E

Tower
- Constructed: 1934
- Construction: concrete tower
- Height: ~50 ft (15 m)
- Shape: cylindrical towerwith balcony and lantern
- Heritage: National Register of Historic Places listed place

Light
- Deactivated: 1944

U.S. National Register of Historic Places
- Designated: December 19, 1974
- Reference no.: 74002224
- Governing body: Commonwealth of the Northern Mariana Islands

The Japanese Lighthouse is an old lighthouse situated atop Navy Hill in Garapan, Saipan, in the Northern Mariana Islands. It was listed on the National Register of Historic Places in 1974. The lighthouse is one of the few surviving pre-World War II, civilian structures originally built by the Japanese.

It was damaged and repaired during WW2, then abandoned until being turned into restaurant in the 1990s but was eventually left derelict again. Since 2021 it was refurbished and has become a popular tourist destination with cafe. known for its views of the surrounding area.

== Design ==
The Japanese Lighthouse is an approximately 50-foot-tall (15 m) white concrete tower attached to a one-story lighthouse keeper's quarters. The concrete used in the construction of the lighthouse was produced from burnt coral and seashells, but weathers easily.

== History ==
The lighthouse was constructed in 1934 to assist ships navigating into Tanapag Harbor on the western coast of Saipan. At the time, Saipan was governed by the Empire of Japan as part of its South Seas Mandate. The lighthouse was in operation until 1944 when it sustained damage from an American naval bombardment in the Battle of Saipan. During the war, the lighthouse was rebuilt by the Seabees and used as a communications center. After the war it was abandoned. The copper dome, however, was removed and put into storage. The Japanese Lighthouse was listed on the National Register of Historic Places on December 19, 1974.

In 1990, the lighthouse was renovated and expanded to be used as a restaurant; the dome was returned to the top of the tower not long after. The restaurant was closed in 1994 to 1995. The graffiti-covered lighthouse was repainted in 2007. It was proposed to be the location of a visitor center for the Marianas Trench Marine National Monument in 2010.

In 2021, the Lighthouse was refurbished and is a cafe.

== See also ==
- Japanese Lighthouse (Poluwat, Chuuk), similar lighthouse in the Federated States of Micronesia
- List of lighthouses in the United States
- National Register of Historic Places listings in the Northern Mariana Islands

== Sources ==
- Lotz, David T (November 29, 1974). "Japanese Lighthouse". National Register of Historic Places Inventory – Nomination Form. National Park Service. (and accompanying two photos)
