= Alet Island =

Island in the Federated States of Micronesia

Coordinates: 7°22′03″N 149°10′39″E

Alet Island, also known as Alei Island, is a small island in the Caroline Islands. It contains a lighthouse built by the Japanese on its west side, which is a registered building. USS Tinosa (SS-283) bombarded a radio station on Alet Island during World War II, and USS Tunny (SS-282) also patrolled off Alet Island. To Island and Elangeb Island are small islands just to the northeast. Poluwat Island lies to the east, and Sau Island to the southeast. Alet and Poluwat was formerly thought of as just one island named Kata before it was decided it was two. Enderby Bank is a reef about 5 miles west northwest of the island.
