= Olimarao =

Pacific uninhabited atoll in Yap State, Federated States of Micronesia

Coordinates: 7°42′30″N 145°52′15″E

Location of Olimarao in the Pacific Ocean

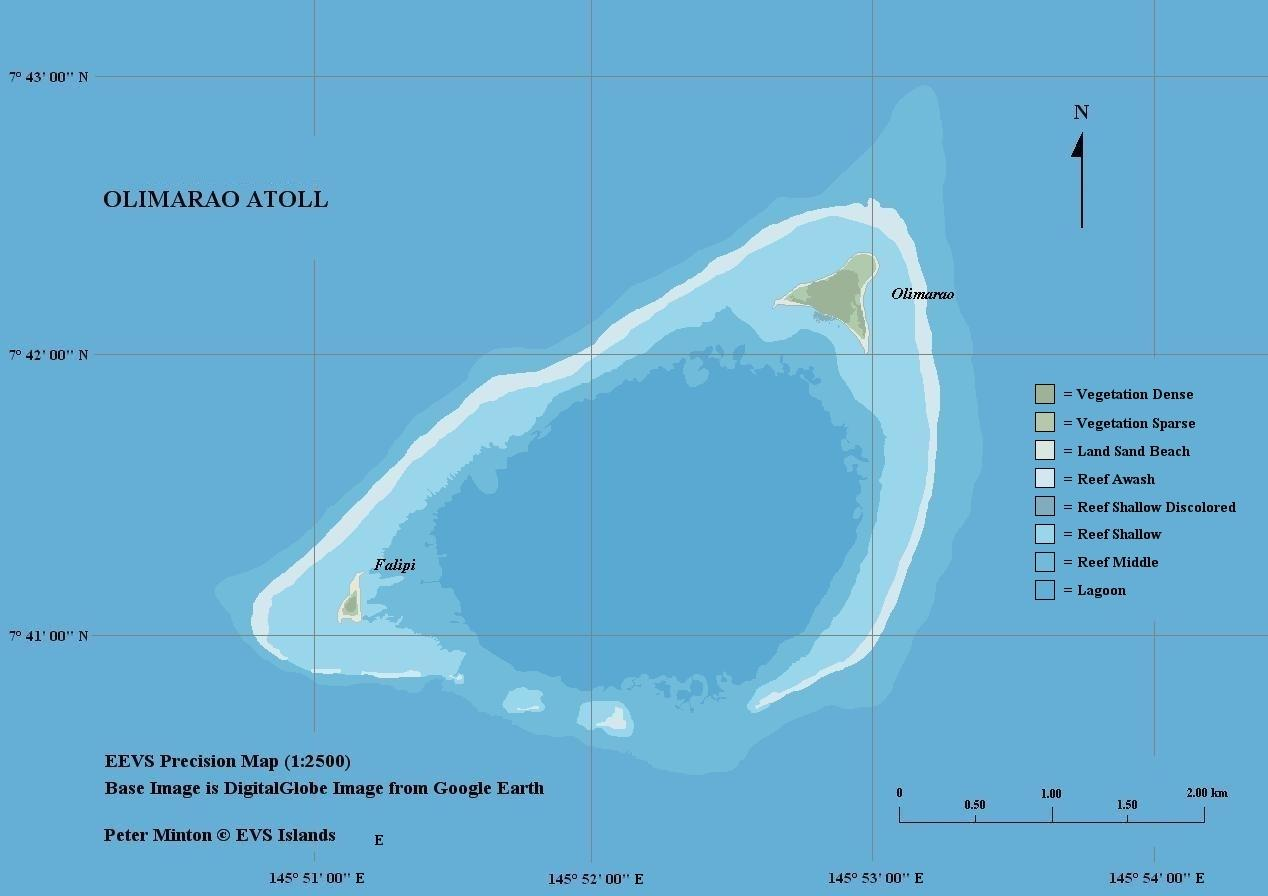
Map of Olimarao Atoll

Olimarao Atoll is an uninhabited atoll with a land area of 0.2 km^{2} in the State of Yap in the Federated States of Micronesia. It is located 36 kilometers northwest of Elato and 860 kilometers southeast of Yap island. Olimarao belongs administratively to Elato.

== Name ==
The name of the island goes back to Proto-Chuukic *weni-maraawu.

== Geography ==
The atoll's surface is 11 km^{2} and it is roughly 5 km long and 3 km wide. The lagoon has a surface of about 6 km^{2} and two passages into it located in the southern fringes of the reef.

=== Islands ===
There are only two small islets (Motus) on the reef, with a total surface of 0.2 km^{2} (20 hectares):

- Olimarao Island, located at the NE end of the reef is the largest
- Falipi Island in the SW corner is only 2.4 ha in surface

Both islands have coconut palms, among other vegetation, like Scaevola taccada bushes.

=== Ecology ===
The whole atoll is part of the Olimarao Conservation Area. This zone is meant to protect the breeding places of sea turtles, coconut crabs and pelagic birds.

== See also ==
- Desert island
- List of islands
