= Japanese Lighthouse (Micronesia) =

- Location: Alet Island, Poluwat, Chuuk, Federated States of Micronesia
- Coordinates: 7°22′15.4″N 149°10′11.4″E

Tower
- Constructed: 1938
- Construction: Concrete
- Height: ~32 m (105 ft)
- Heritage: National Register of Historic Places listed place

Light
- First lit: 1940
- Deactivated: 1944

U.S. National Register of Historic Places
- Designated: August 16, 1983
- Reference no.: 83004523

The Japanese Lighthouse, or Poluwat Lighthouse, is an abandoned lighthouse situated on Alet Island in Poluwat, Chuuk in the Federated States of Micronesia. It was completed in 1940 by the Japanese and was in use until being attacked by U.S. forces in World War II. It was listed on the National Register of Historic Places in 1983. The lighthouse is a good example of pre-World War II "marine architecture" built by the Japanese.

== Design ==
The Japanese Lighthouse is approximately 32 meters (105 ft) tall and built completely out of concrete with walls 0.6 meters (2 ft) thick. Attached to the tower is a two-story operations building. The site also includes a 9-by-4-meter (30 ft × 13 ft), single-story, concrete generator building. The entire complex is surrounded by a perimeter fence consisting of horizontal and vertical concrete posts.

== History ==
To assist with navigation by ships between Palau and Chuuk Lagoon, construction on a lighthouse was started in 1938 by the Empire of Japan. At the time, Chuuk and much of Micronesia was governed by the Japanese as part of its South Seas Mandate. As the construction utilized forced labor from Poluwat and neighboring islands, as well as lacking heavy machinery, the lighthouse was not completed until 1940. It and the nearby airfield were discovered by American reconnaissance aircraft on April 10, 1944. Repeated airstrikes soon put both out of commission. The lighthouse was abandoned and never rebuilt, eventually becoming overgrown with tropical vegetation. It was listed on the National Register of Historic Places on August 16, 1983.

== See also ==
- Japanese Lighthouse (Garapan, Saipan), similar lighthouse in the Northern Mariana Islands

== Sources ==
- Russell, Scott (December 3, 1980). "Japanese Lighthouse on Puluwat Atoll" (National Register of Historic Places Inventory – Nomination Form). National Park Service.
