= Fayu Atoll =

Island in Chuuk State, Federal States of Micronesia

Coordinates: 8°33′N 151°20′E

Location of Fayu Atoll in Chuuk State, Federated States of Micronesia

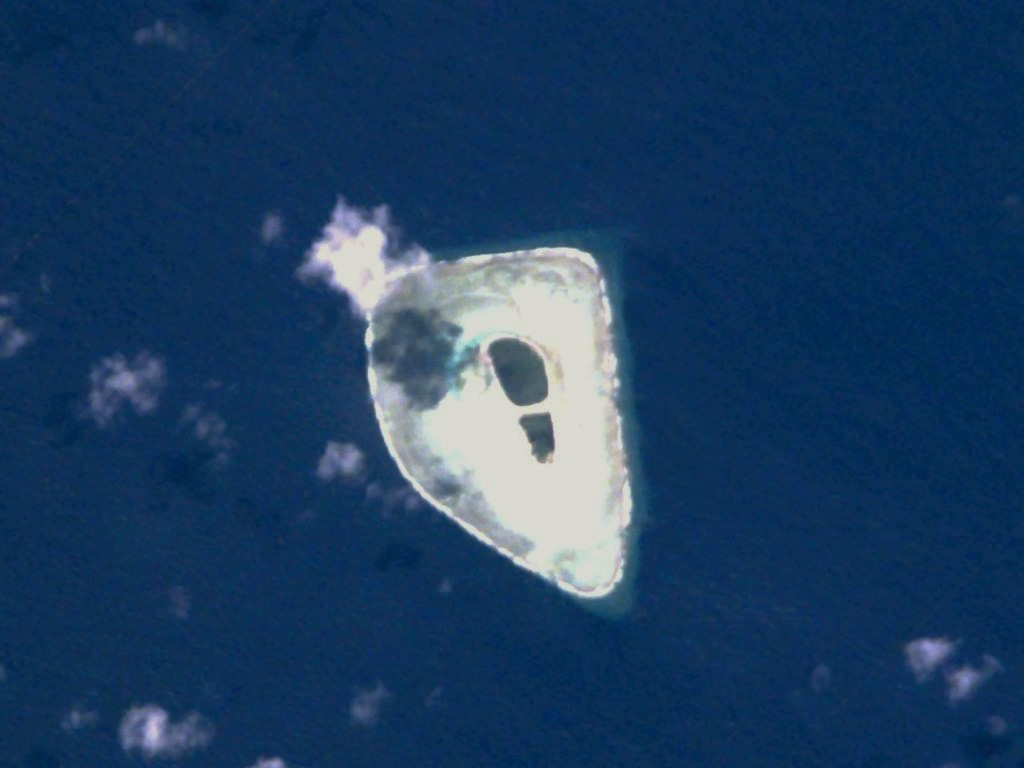
NASA picture of Fayu Atoll

Fayu Atoll (also called East Fayu) is an uninhabited atoll in the state of Chuuk, Federated States of Micronesia. It is located 36 km to the west of Nomwin Atoll and 104 km north of Chuuk Lagoon.

In order to distinguish this atoll from West Fayu (also called Piagailoe Atoll) in Yap State, located about 500 km to the west, this atoll is also known as East Fayu.

The atoll is roughly 2.7 km long and 1.4 km wide in its widest place. It has a surface of 2,5 km^{2}. The atoll is composed of a reef shelf with a very shallow lagoon on it. There are two islands in the middle of the lagoon, located closely together, with a total surface of about 40 ha.

Although presently uninhabited, the atoll had a population of 50 inhabitants in 1860. The presence of fresh water in this atoll was the subject of a Micronesian legend, "The Sweet Waters of East Fayu".

Although geographically not part of the Hall Islands, administratively Fayu belongs to Nomwin municipality, of the northwestern region (Oksoritod) of Chuuk State.

On 26 August 2016, two people were rescued from the island after a US Navy helicopter spotted their SOS sign drawn into sand on East Fayu Island, and alerted the US Coast Guard. Linus and Sabina Jack, both in their 50s, who were reported missing a week earlier when they failed to reach a nearby island. The couple had left Weno Island with limited supplies and no emergency equipment. The Navy P-8A Poseidon aircraft crew spotted the boaters on the beach near their makeshift sign on Friday. A search and rescue team was called in by the Coast Guard and the survivors were rescued and transferred by patrol boat to Nomwin Atoll.
