= Piagailoe =

Atoll of the Caroline Islands

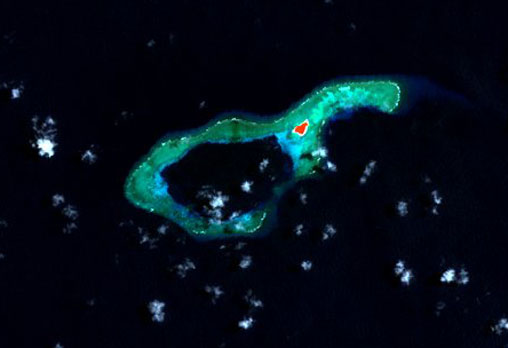
- NASA picture of Piagailoe Atoll

- Location within Federated States of Micronesia

Geography
- Coordinates: 8°5′00″N 146°44′00″E
- Length: 7 km (4.3 mi)
- Width: 3.5 km (2.17 mi)

Administration
- Federated States of Micronesia
- State: Yap
- Municipality: Satawal

Demographics
- Population: 0

Piagailoe Atoll is an uninhabited atoll in the State of Yap in the Federated States of Micronesia, geographically part of the Caroline Islands. It is located 71 kilometers northeast of Lamotrek, 71 kilometers northwest of Satawal and 945 kilometers southeast of Yap island. This atoll lies at the western end of a chain of submarine mountains that extend westwards of the Gray Feather Bank for about 180 km. The Condor Reef, Pikelot and the Oraitilipu Bank belong to this underwater feature as well. In order to distinguish this atoll from Fayu (East Fayu) Atoll in Chuuk State, located about 500 km to the east, this atoll is also known as West Fayu.

The atoll is roughly 7 km long and 3.5 km wide in its widest area. The 5.6 km^{2} lagoon has a passage into it located in the southwestern fringe of the reef. Its maximum depth is 38 m.

There is only one island on the reef, West Fayu Island, with a surface of 6 ha. It is located at the NE end of the reef.

Administratively it belongs to Satawal municipality, which is also one of the legislative districts of Yap State.
