= Namonuito Atoll =

Pacific atoll of Federated States of Micronesia

Location of Namonuito Atoll in Chuuk State, Federated States of Micronesia

Namonuito Atoll, also called Namonweito, Weito, or Magur Islands, is the largest atoll of the Federated States of Micronesia and of the Caroline Islands with a total area of 2,267 square kilometres (875 square miles), unless one considers the still larger Chuuk (Truk) Lagoon as a type of atoll in an early stage of development. In Micronesia, only Kwajalein Atoll of the Marshall Islands is still larger.

Namonuito Atoll lies in the northwestern region (Oksoritod) of Chuuk State, the largest federal state of the Federated States of Micronesia, about 170 kilometres (110 miles) northwest of Chuuk Lagoon (measured from Pisaras Islet to the northern and western parts of the fringing reef of Chuuk Lagoon. It is roughly triangular in shape, with the base running 82 kilometres (51 miles) along its southern side.

The southwest corner of the triangle is marked by Onoun islet, the main island (largest and most populated), also called Ulul.

The other islets lie mostly on the northeast side, from Piherarh (Pisaras) in the southeast corner to Makur (Magur) islet in the north corner. The 12 islets have an aggregate land area of only 4.5 square kilometres (1.7 square miles). The total population is 1,341 (census of 2000).

The reef rim of the atoll is submerged for the greater part and is marked by the lighter colour of the water over it. The depths on the reef range from 0.9 to 18.3 metres (2 feet 11.4 inches to 60 feet 0.5 inches). The reef appears to be in the process of formation and can be crossed at many places. The lagoon is not of uniform depth. Except for a 5.5 metres (18.0 feet) patch, located 22 kilometres (14 miles) west of Pisaras island, and a detached reef, with depths of 2.7 to 3.7 metres (8 feet 10 inches to 12 feet 2 inches), located about 10 kilometres (6.2 miles) of Pisaras, there appears to be a depth greater than 9 metres (30 feet) on the scattered lagoon coral heads.

Pisaras Island has coconut palms and other trees growing on it. Reefs extend northwest and west-northwest from the island, enclosing a shallow and foul bay. Ulul Island is densely covered with coconut palms. A drying reef fringes the island. There is a radio station on the island.

The atoll is home to five of the 40 municipalities of Chuuk state, listed in counterclockwise sequence, with population (2000):

Landsat visible color image
Municipality	alternate or former name	Land area km²	Population (census 2000)	location	islands	coordinates
Onoun	Ulul	2.54	598	southwest corner	Ulul Island	08°35′22″N 149°39′37″E
Piherarh	Pisaras	0.80	227	southeast corner	Wabonoru Islet; Pisaras Island; Pielimal Islet; Weltot Islet	08°35′50″N 150°21′18″E; 08°34′55″N 150°24′26″E; 08°36′50″N 150°22′38″E; 08°37′15″N 150°22′16″E
Unanu	Onari	0.26	178	northeast rim	Onari Island; Bihof Islet; Behiliper Islet; Amurtride Islet	08°45′11″N 150°19′46″E; 08°45′43″N 150°19′24″E; 08°46′03″N 150°19′02″E; 08°46′10″N 150°18′47″E
Onou	Ono	0.31	182	northeast rim	Ono Island	08°47′52″N 150°16′58″E
Makur	Magur Islands	0.47	156	north corner	Magur Island; Magererik Islet	08°59′27″N 150°07′22″E; 08°57′24″N 150°03′53″E
Namonuito Atoll	Magur Islands	4.38	1,341			08°40′00″N 150°00′00″E

== History ==
Namonuito was first visited by Spanish explorers on the galleon San Jerónimo on 5 July 1566. At Pisaras Island, the rebel pilot Lope Martín and his gang of mutineers (thirteen soldiers and thirteen sailors) murdered Captain Pero Sánchez Pericón and other expedition members, and were subsequently marooned.

Onou Island was later visited by Spanish naval officer Juan Antonio de Ibargoitia commanding the vessel Filipino in 1801 who charted it as Anonima (Anonymous).

== Onoun Airfield ==
Onoun Airfield
- IATA: none; ICAO: none

Summary
- Airport type: Public
- Owner: Government
- Operator: Civil Government
- Serves: Namonuito Atoll
- Interactive map of Onoun Airfield

Runways
Direction	Length		Surface
Direction	ft	m	Surface
	1,200	370	Chipseal

Onoun Airfield is located on the west side of the atoll. Caroline Islands Air has chartered service. Aircraft land on a 1,200 feet (370 m) chipseal runway.
