= Hall Islands =

Pacific atolls in Chuuk State, Federated States of Micronesia

Coordinates: 8°35′30″N 152°05′00″E

Location of the Hall Islands in the Pacific Ocean

The Hall Islands are a group of two large atolls in the northern part of the state of Chuuk, Federated States of Micronesia. In the broader sense, a third and smaller atoll is included.

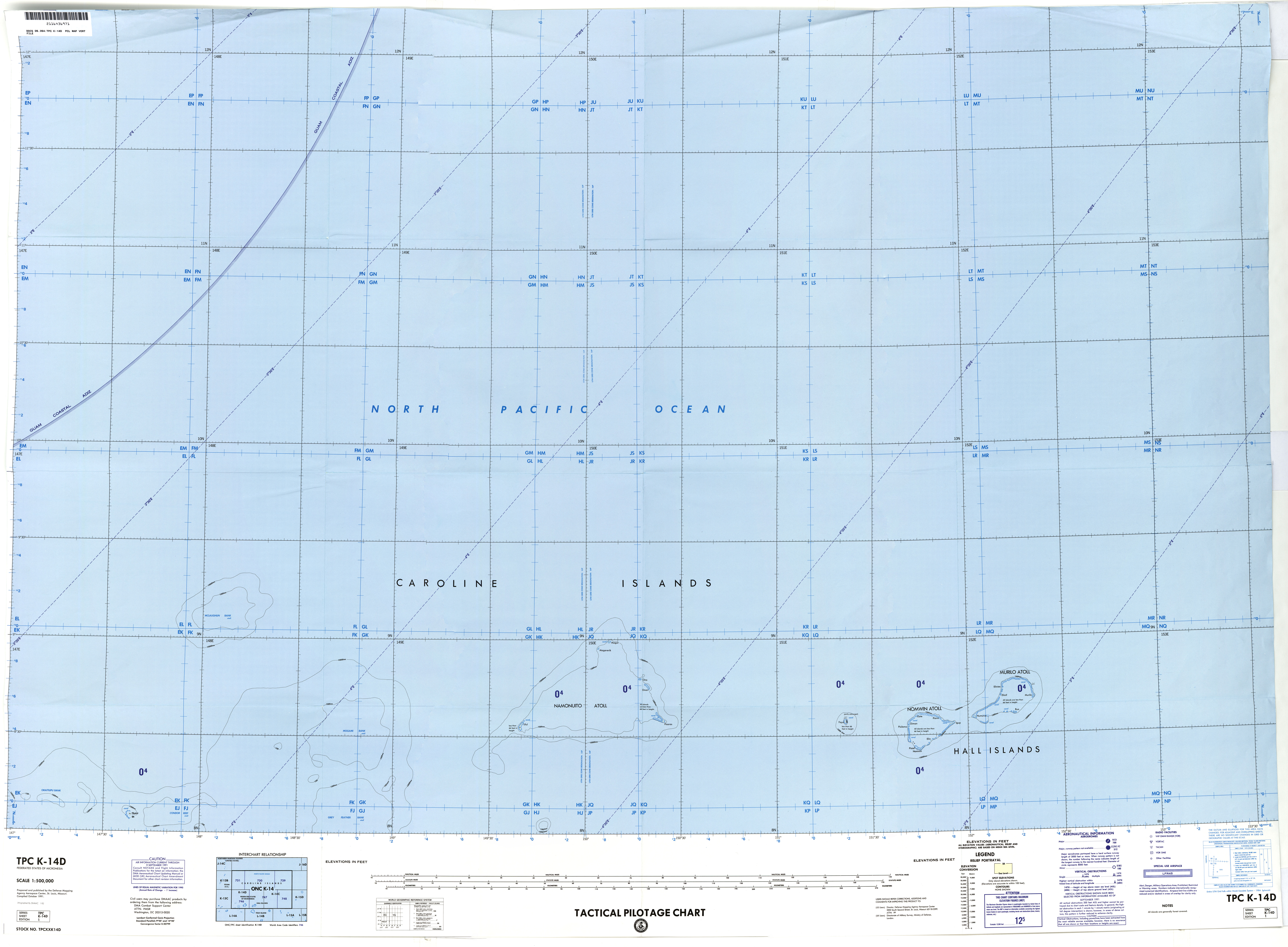
Map including the Hall Islands (DMA, 1991)

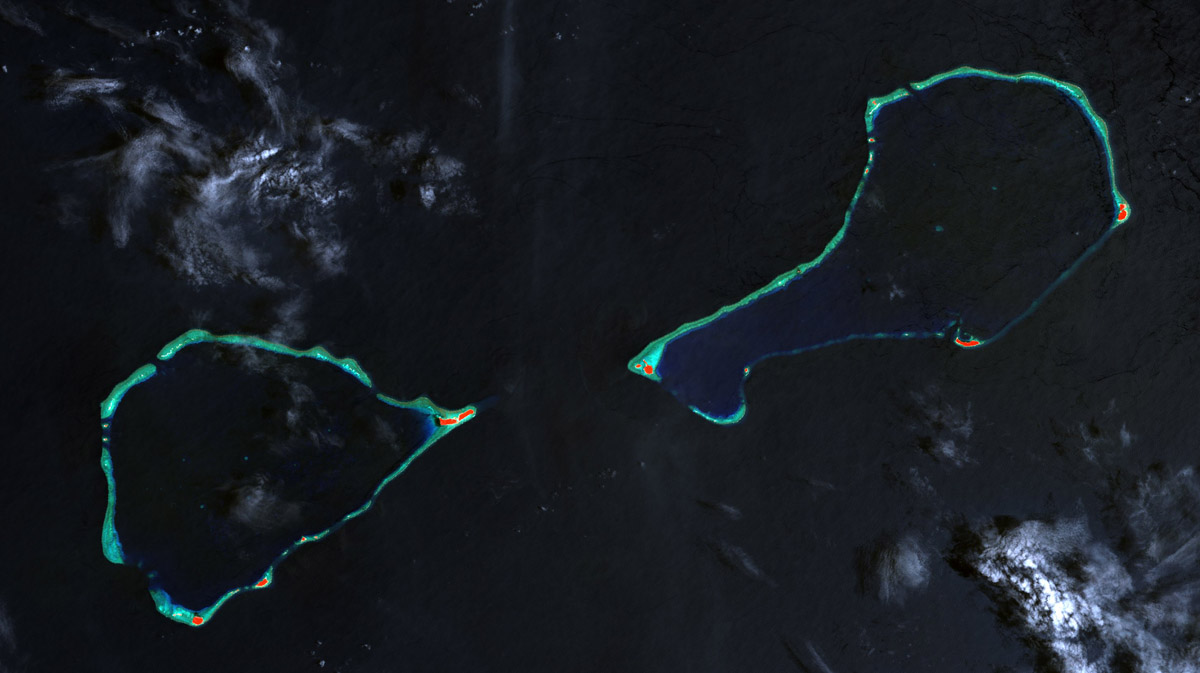
Landsat picture of the Hall islands: Nomwin to the west, Murilo to the east

Nomwin, the western atoll, and Murilo, the eastern one, are located about 9 km apart, being the emergent parts of a twin-lobed seamount. Murilo and Nomwin each harbor a population of more than 1,000 people. They lie roughly 100 km to the north of Chuuk Lagoon. Uninhabited East Fayu, lying 30+ km to the west of Nomwin, is sometimes included in the Halls. The three atolls together account for a dry surface of about 3.5 km^{2} over more than 50 islets or motus.
