= Murilo, Federated States of Micronesia =

Island and municipality in Chuuk State

Coordinates: 8°41′33″N 152°20′21″E

Location of Murilo Atoll in the Pacific Ocean

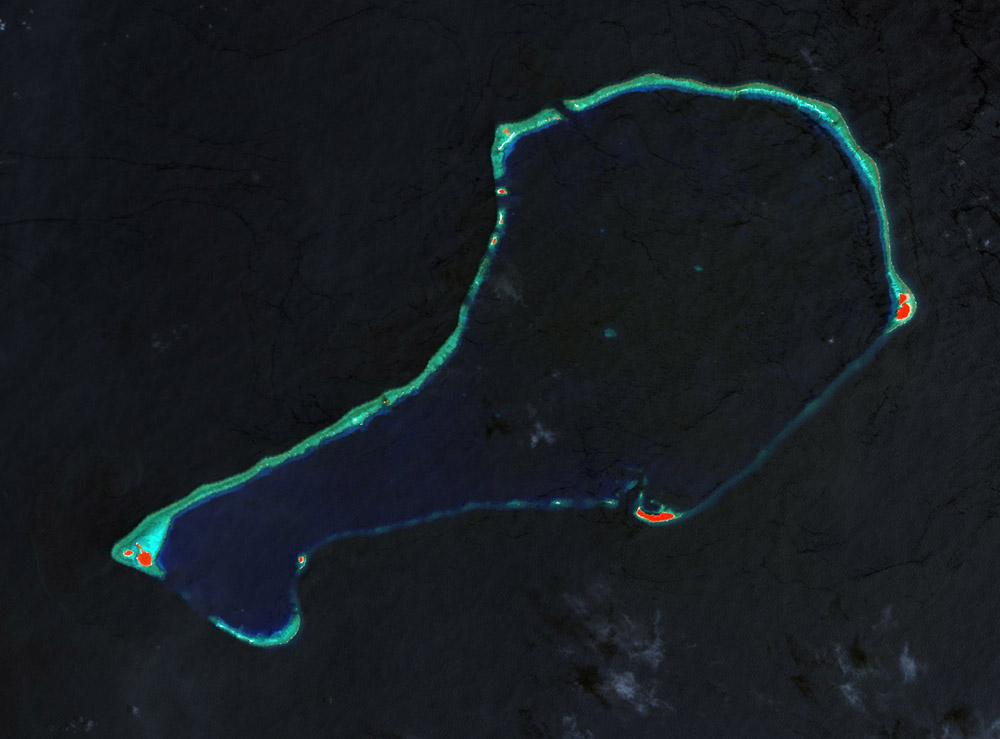
Landsat picture of Murilo Atoll

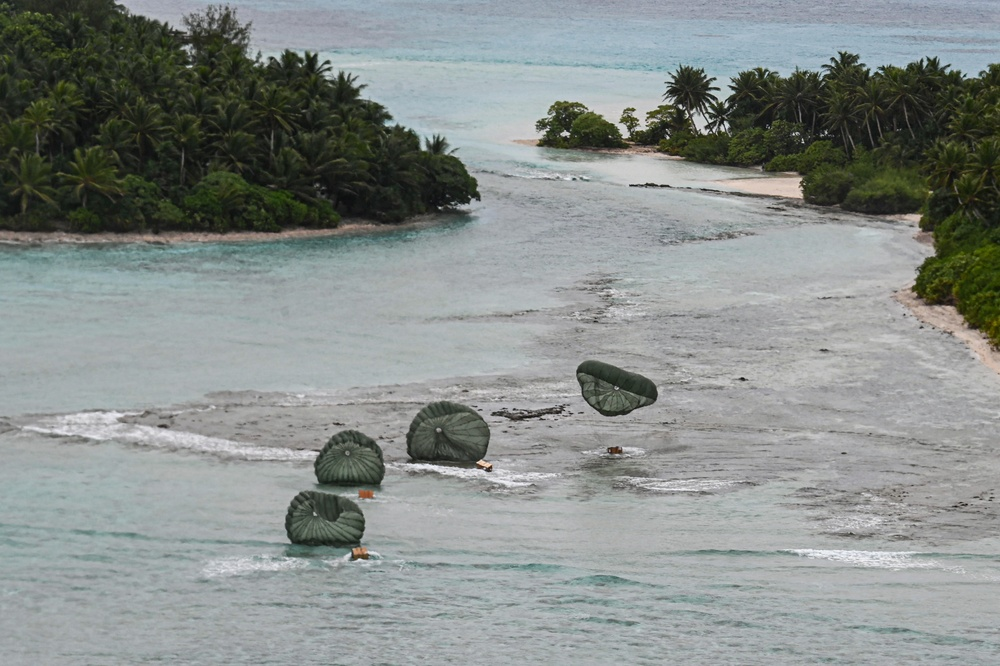
The shores of Murilo

Murilo is a village, atoll, and municipality in the state of Chuuk, Federated States of Micronesia.

It is located 9 km to the NE of Nomwin Atoll and 101 km to the NNE of Chuuk Lagoon. Its population is over 1,000 people. Together with Nomwin, Ruo, and Fananu they form the Hall Islands.

In 2010, the people of this small atoll ate at a "feast" of poisonous, critically endangered hawksbill turtles - 96 got seriously ill, 6 died, 4 of them children.
