= States of the Federated States of Micronesia =

Micronesia is made up of 4 states, modeled after the administrative divisions of the United States.

== States ==
Flag	State	Capital	Land area	Population (2010 Census)	Population density
Chuuk State	Chuuk	Weno	127 km^{2}	48,654	383 per km^{2}
Kosrae	Kosrae	Tofol	110 km^{2}	6,616	60 per km^{2}
Pohnpei State	Pohnpei	Kolonia	346 km^{2}	36,196	105 per km^{2}
Yap State	Yap	Colonia	118 km^{2}	11,377	96 per km^{2}
