= US Naval Base Carolines =

Major World War 2 bases in Caroline Islands

Establishment
  - US Navy Base: 1944
- Time zone: UTC+10 and +11

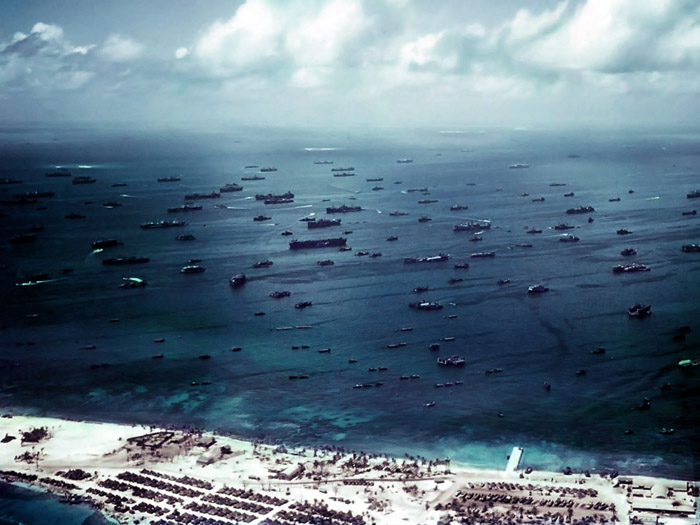
Sorlen Island and the north anchorage of Ulithi Atoll in late 1944.

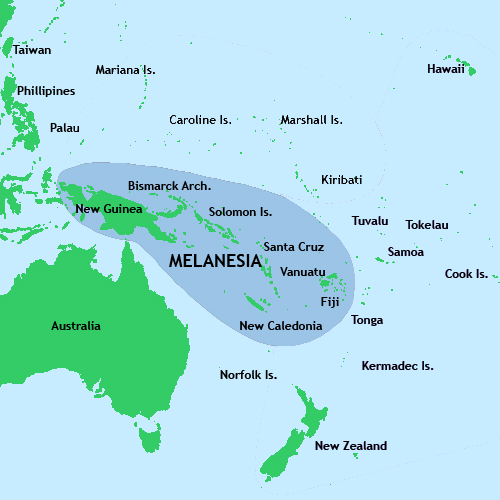
The Caroline Islands north of the Melanesia Islands

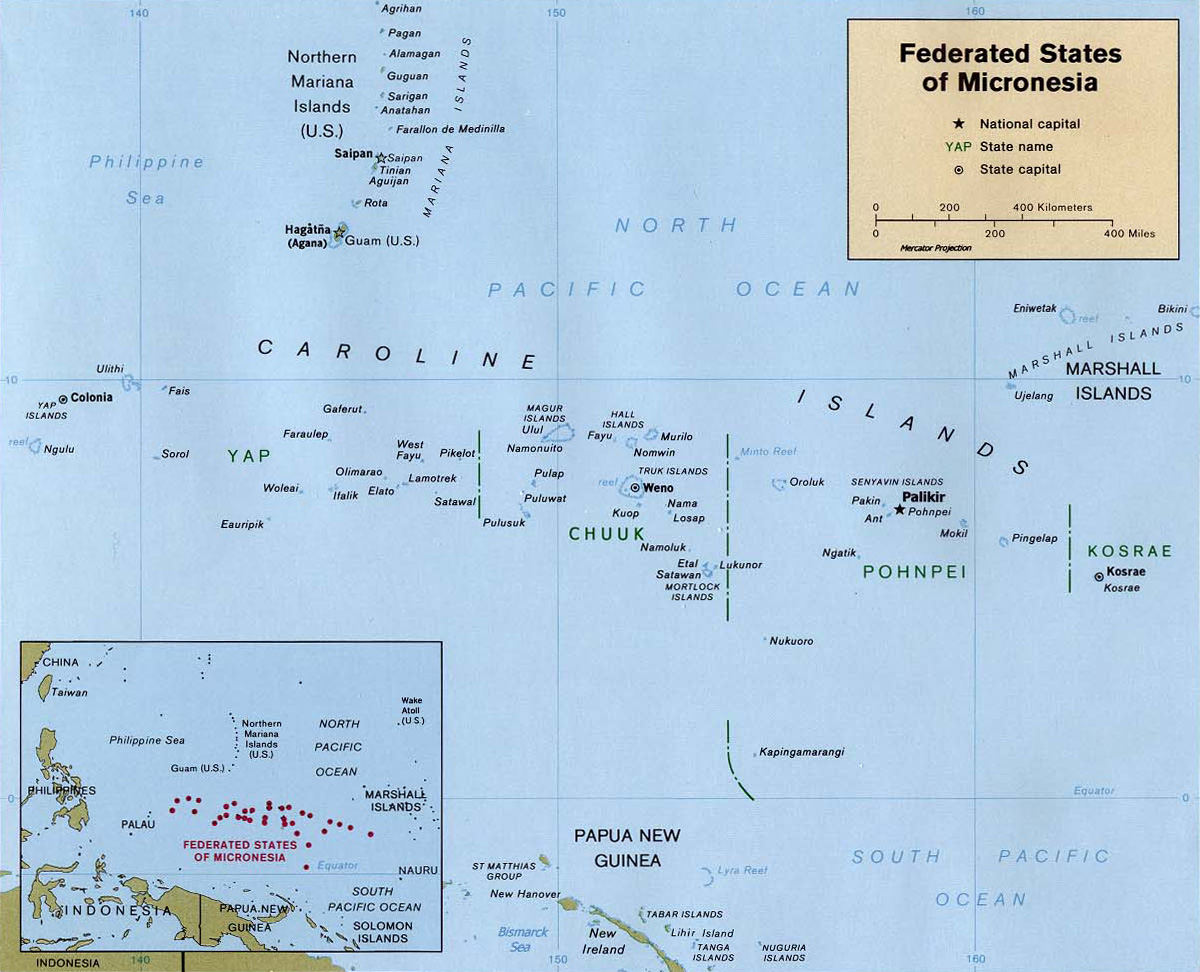
A map of the Federated States of Micronesia

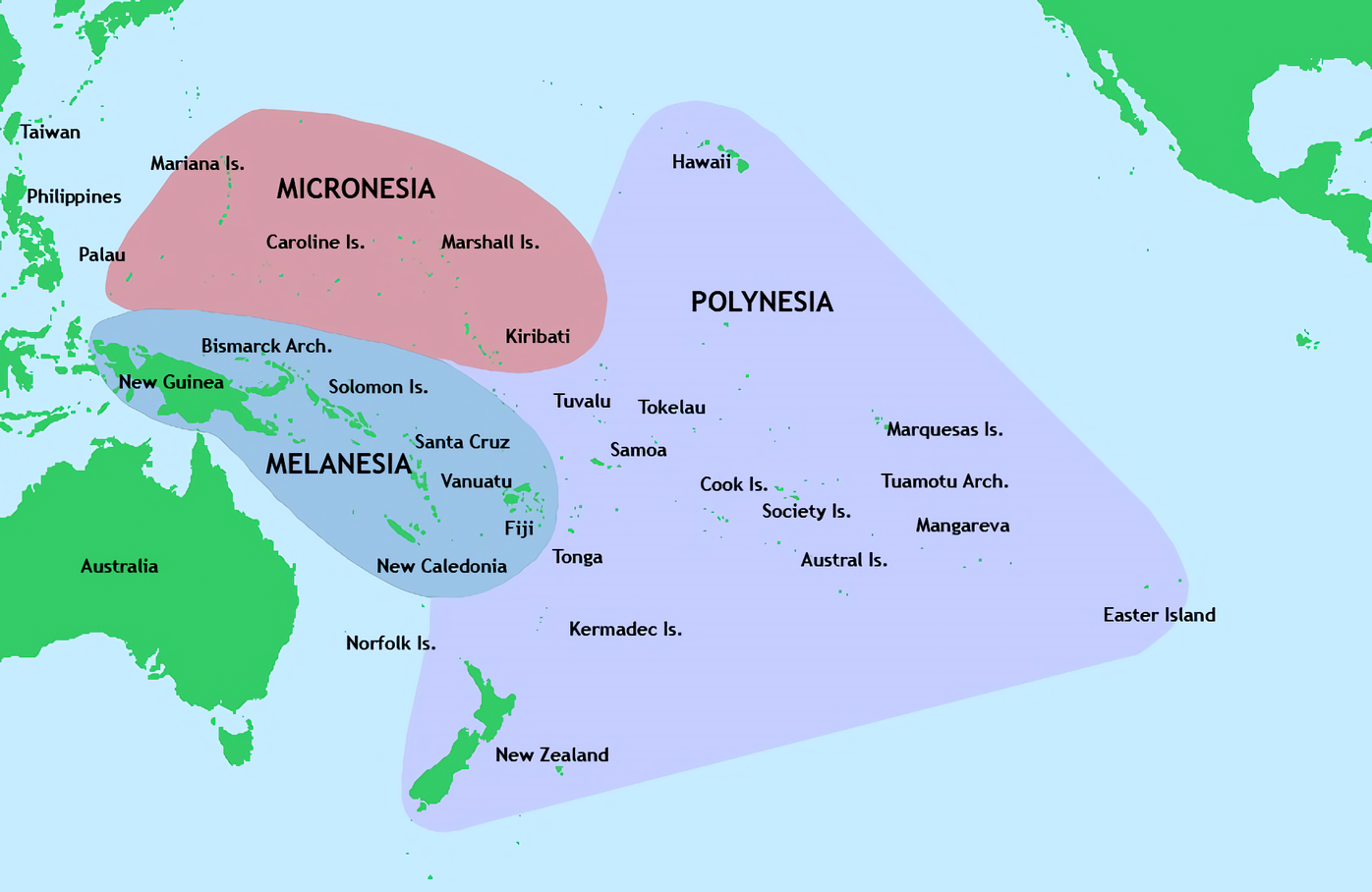
Micronesia is one of three major areas in the Pacific Ocean, along with Polynesia and Melanesia

US Naval Base Carolines included a number of United States Navy bases on the Caroline Islands in the western Pacific Ocean, to the north of New Guinea during World War II. The bases were built to support the island hopping Pacific War efforts of the allied nations fighting the Empire of Japan.

== History ==
The Caroline Islands is now the Federated States of Micronesia nation. Micronesia comprises Kosrae State, Pohnpei State, Chuuk State (in past spelled Truk) and Yap State. After the Spanish–American War in 1898, the islands became a German colony and German naval base. At the start of World War I in 1914 British warships destroyed the German colonial plantation owner's radio station. On October 7, 1914, Japan invaded and took over Yap island without a battle.

Japan and Britain made a treaty giving Japan the Pacific islands north of the Equator, signed at the Treaty of Versailles in 1919. In the 1930s Japan built naval and airbases on many of the islands. Truk Lagoon was the largest and strongest of these bases. The United States Army Air Forces bombed the Truk base, but it was bypassed in the amphibious landing war.

Japan's Truk base had five airfields, fleet anchorage, a few seaplane bases, torpedo boat bases, repair facilities, and later a radar station. Japan also built a large base at Ponape, now Pohnpei. By February 1944, the US bombers destroyed Truk and by sea, the US Navy cut had cut off Truk and the 5,000 Japanese troops. The US also bypassed Ponape in the Senyavin Islands and it 8,000 troops.

The United States Armed Forces built a large base at Ulithi Atoll in the Yap islands, as it had a large fleet anchorage for up to 700 ships. The US Army 81st Division landed unopposed on Ulithi on September 23, 1944. Soon US Navy Seabees started work building the large base at Ulithi. The US Navy survey ship USS Sumner found the lagoon was well protected and usable for fleet anchorage. Japan bombed the US base at Ulithi a few times, with only marginal damage. The Fleet Post Office (FPO) for Caroline Islands was # 3249.

After the war, the Caroline Islands became parts of the Trust Territory of the Pacific Islands administered by the United States. In 1986, the new nation of the Federated States of Micronesia was formed. Independence was proclaimed on May 10, 1979, and Compact of Free Association was established on November 3, 1986.

== Major bases ==
- Naval Base Ulithi on Ulithi Atoll, FPO# 3011
- Naval Base Peleliu on Palau Islands.
  - Naval base Angaur Island, on Palau Islands, base to support Angaur Airstrip
- Naval Base at Uman Island, Truk Lagoon, FPO#3048, 4th Fleet anchorage, PT Boat Base.
- Naval Base Kossol Roads, FPO#3027, Fleet anchorage a surrendered base, staging area to support operations in the Philippines. Service Squadron was stationed at Kossol Roads as a floating resupply and repair base.

== Minor bases ==
- Naval Base at Puluwat Island, Truk Lagoon, FPO#3044
- Naval Base at Fefan Island, Truk Lagoon, FPO#3045, captured seaport
- Naval Base at Yap Island, FPO#3014, captured base
- Naval Base at Param Island, Truk Lagoon, FPO#3050, post war surrendered Airfield
- Naval Base at Tol Island, Truk, FPO#3105, post war surrendered base
- Naval Base at Sorol Island, FPO#3012, post war surrendered small base
- Naval Base at Namonuito Atoll, FPO#3037
- Naval Base at Minto Reef, FPO#3038
- Naval Base at Pulap Island, FPO#3039
- Naval Base at Pakin Island, Senyavin IslandsFPO#3064
- Naval Base at Ant Island, in Senyavin Islands, FPO#3067
- Naval Base at Oroluk Atoll, FPO#3075, Oroluk Island had a lookout tower and Oroluk Lagoon for anchorage.
- Naval Base at Ngulu Atoll, FPO#3079
- Naval Base at Namolus Island, FPO#3081
- Naval Base at Tonelik Island, FPO#3082, post war surrendered small base
- Naval Base at Woleai Island, FPO#3246, post war surrendered Woleai airfield.
- Naval Base at Hall Islands, FPO#3061, located to the north of Truk Lagoon.
- Small Naval base to support Fais Airfield
- Colonia Airfield post war surrendered a small base

== American missions against Japan Carolines ==
From the US Naval Base Carolines the US had many missions against Japan bases in the Carolines. Japan's base at Truk, that the US Navy called The "Gibraltar of the Pacific, was invasion bypassed in the island hopping Pacific war efforts. Truk had over 30,000 troops, seaport, five airstrips, a seaplane bases, a torpedo boat station, a submarine base and coastal artillery. Truk was attacked by air and had its supply lines cut off by sea, called Operation Hailstone.

- Truk Atoll:
- Param Airfield on Param Island in Truk Lagoon.
- Eten Airfield on Eten Island in Truk Lagoon.
- Megeson Airfield (Megeson) started in 1944 not completed.
- Dublon Seaplane Base on Dublon Island and Truk Lagoon
- Reef Islands base at Truk
- Polle Island base at Truk
- Eot Island base
- Pata Island base
- Fala-Beguets Island base
- Yawata Island base (Yawata Shima)
- Salat Island base
- Northeast Island
- Falo Island base
- Udot Island base
- Moen Island (Weno) in Truk Lagoon, two airfields and seaplane base:
  - Moen No. 1 Airfield now Chuuk International Airport the northwestern tip of Moen Island.
  - Moen No. 2 Airfield now part of Chuuk International Airport, located at the southwestern corner of Moen Island.
  - Moen Seaplane Base was at the southwestern corner of Moen Island.

== Post war ==
- Pohnpei Airport built by a US Navy civil engineering team in 1972.

== Gallery ==
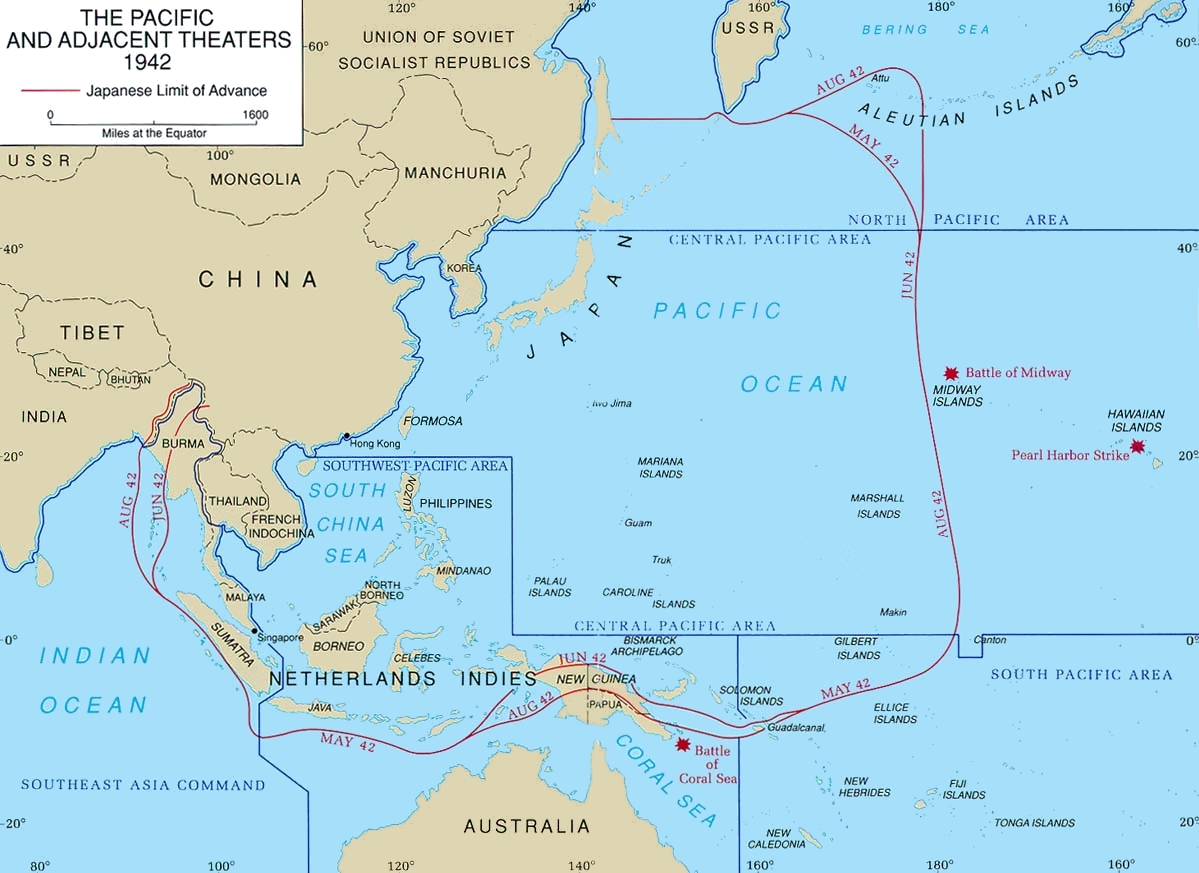
A map of the Pacific War Theater, 1942

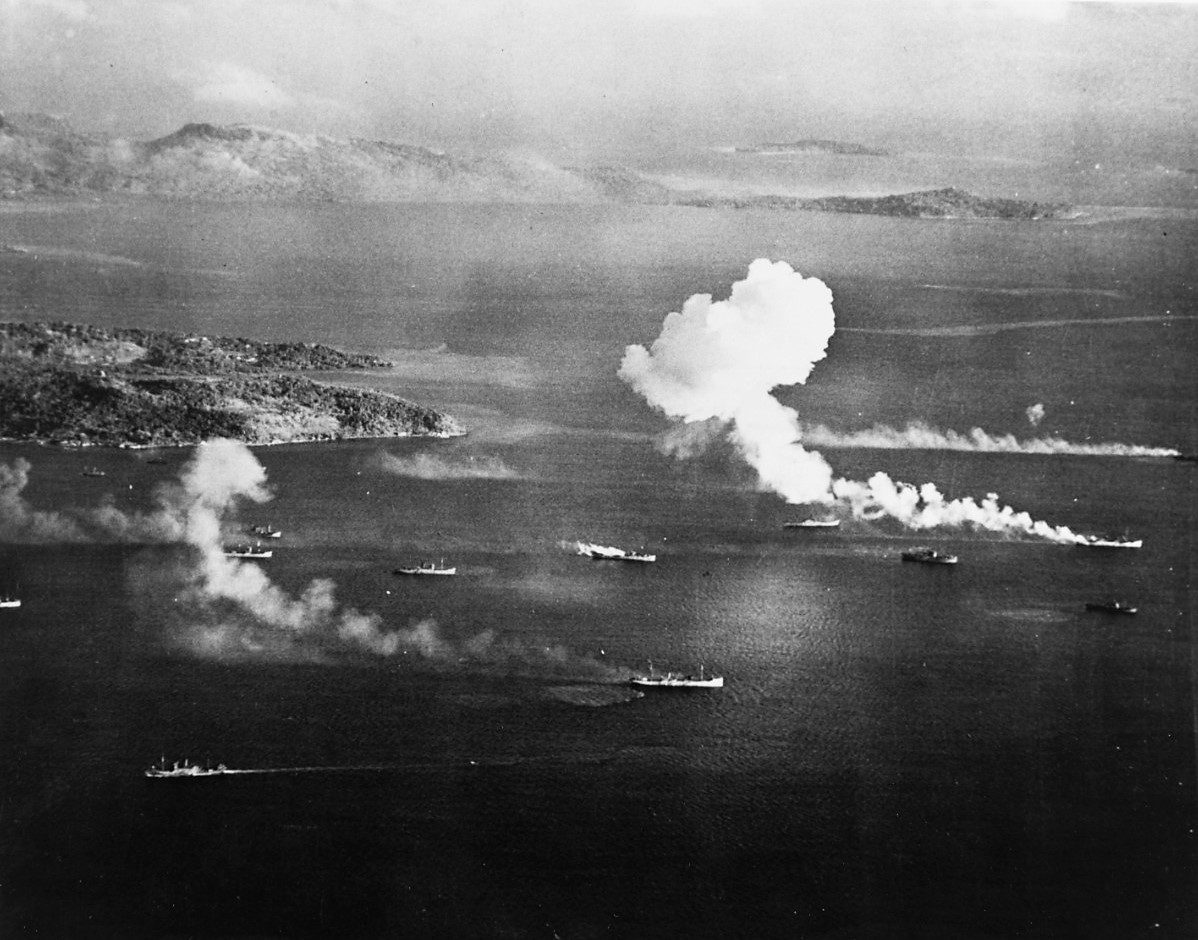
Japanese ships burning off Dublon Island, Truk Lagoon, on the first day of air strikes conducted as part of Operation Hailstone

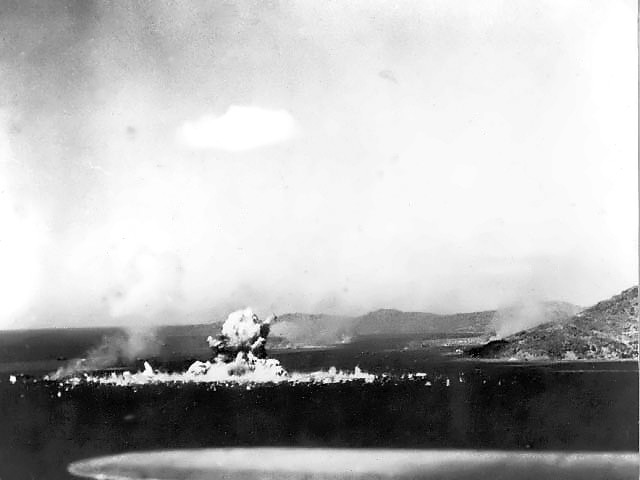
Japanese ammunition ship Aikoku Maru in Truk Harbor explodes

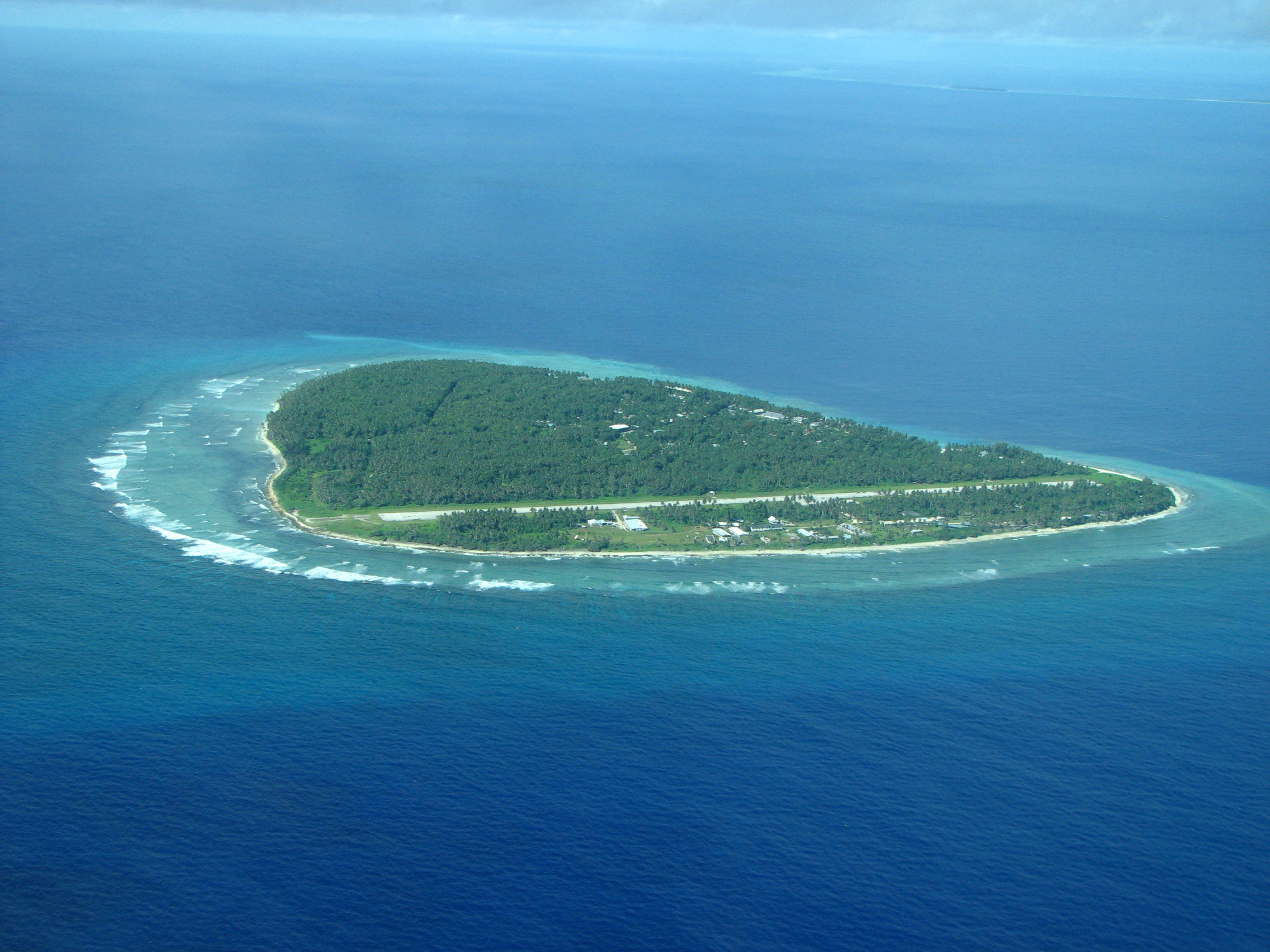
Falalop Island in Ulithi Atoll

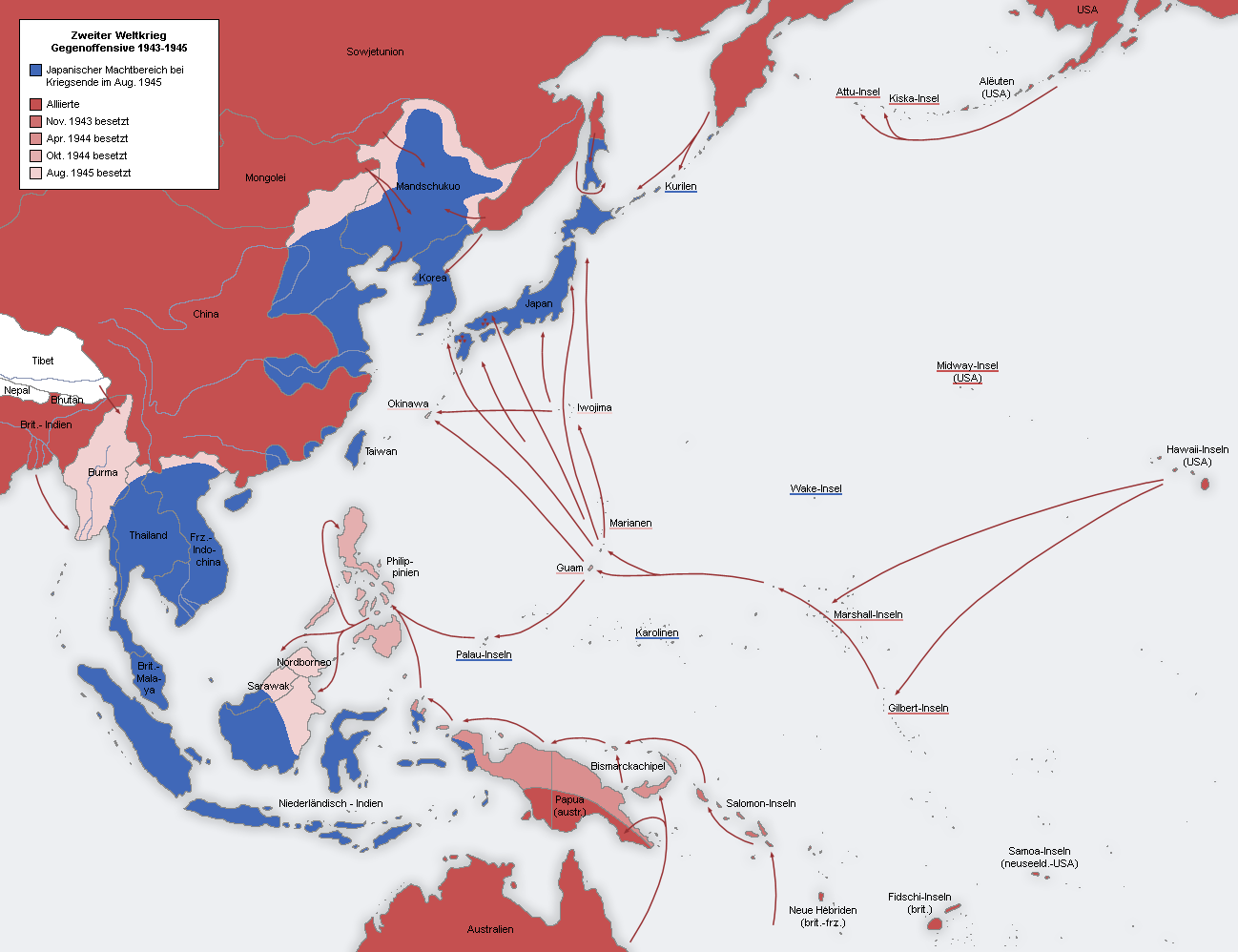
Second world war leapfrogging strategy 1943-1945 map

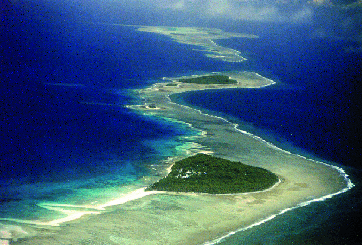
Ulithi atoll

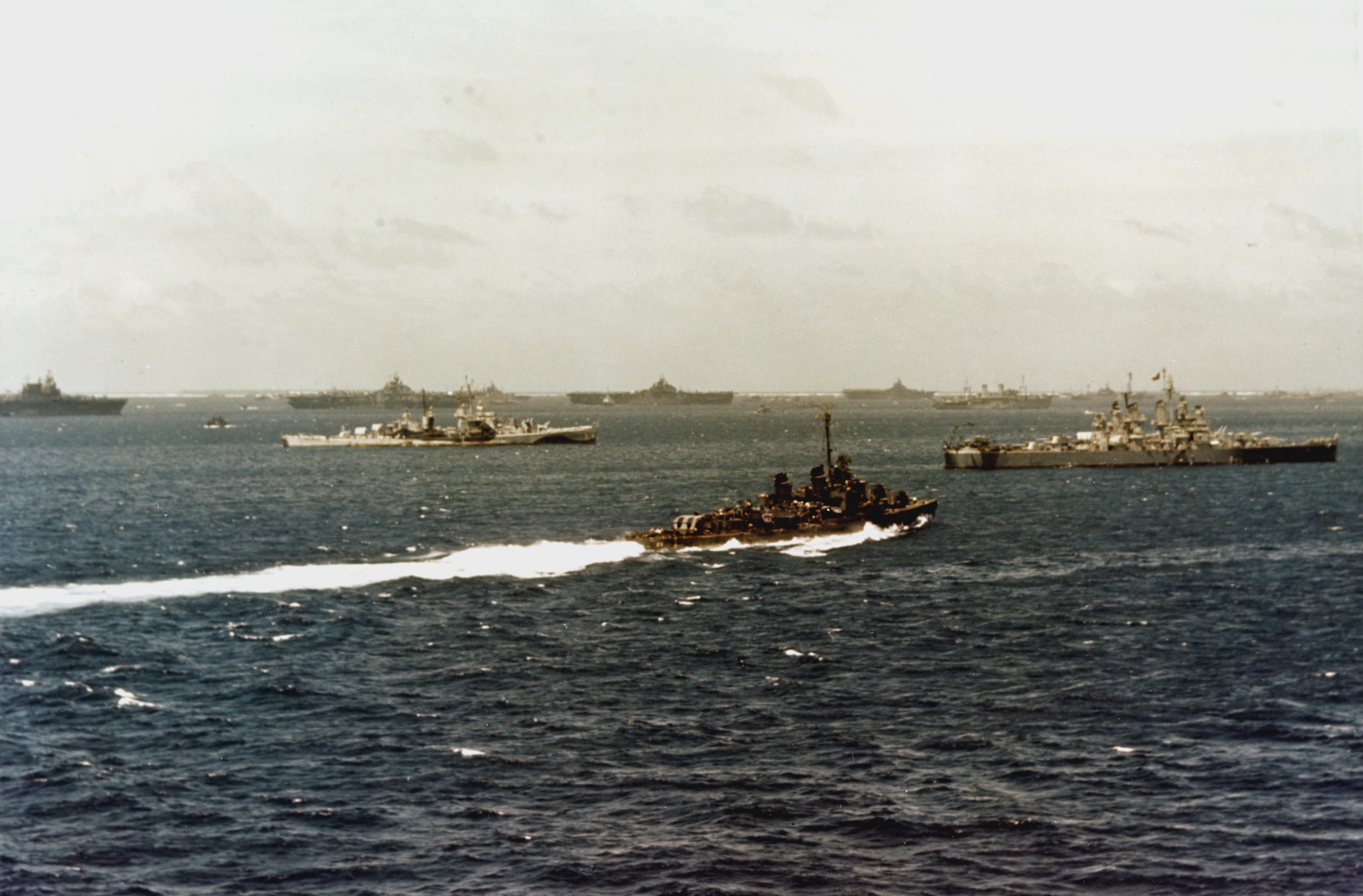
USS Shannon (DM-25) in Ulithi Atoll in March 1945

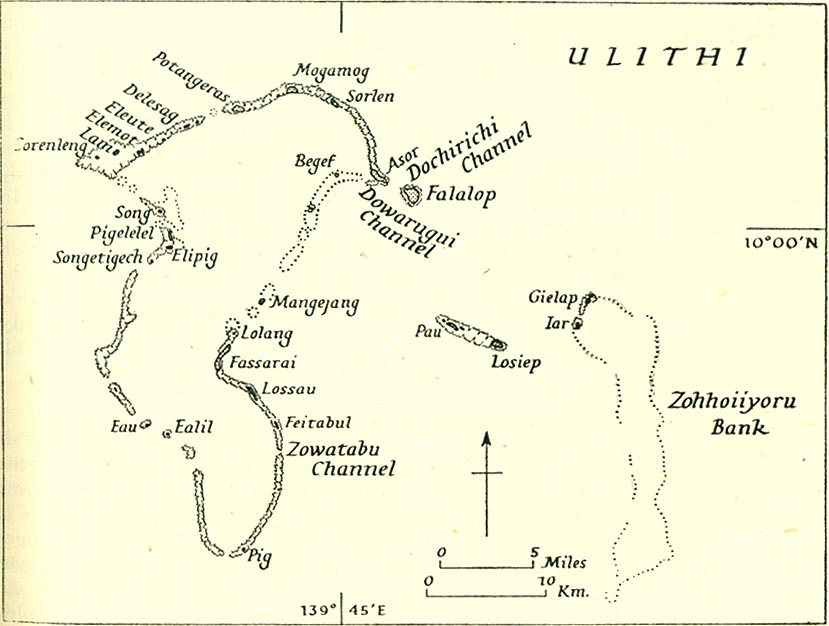
A map of Ulithi Atoll

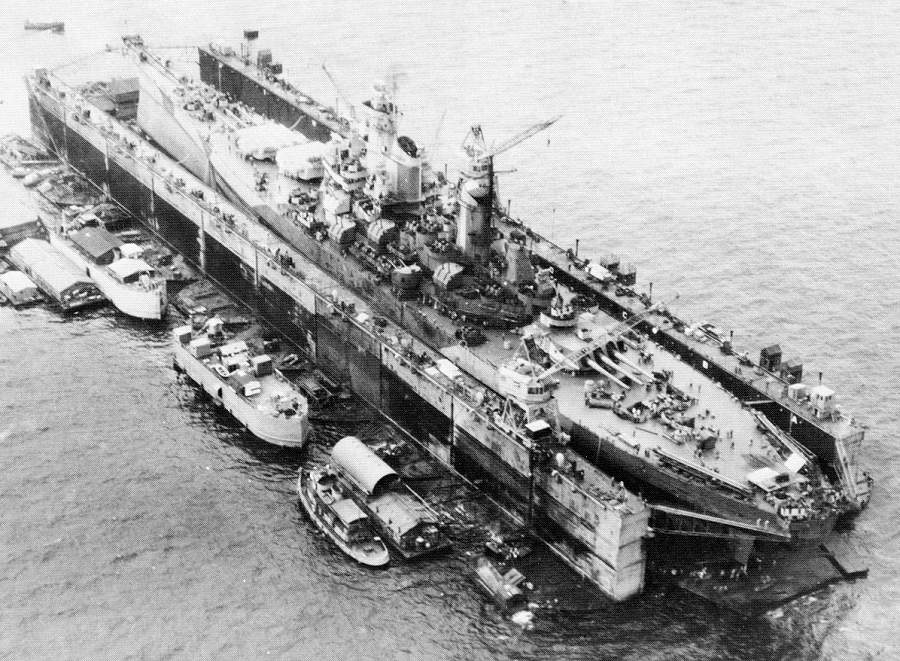
USS Iowa in a Auxiliary floating drydock at Ulithi

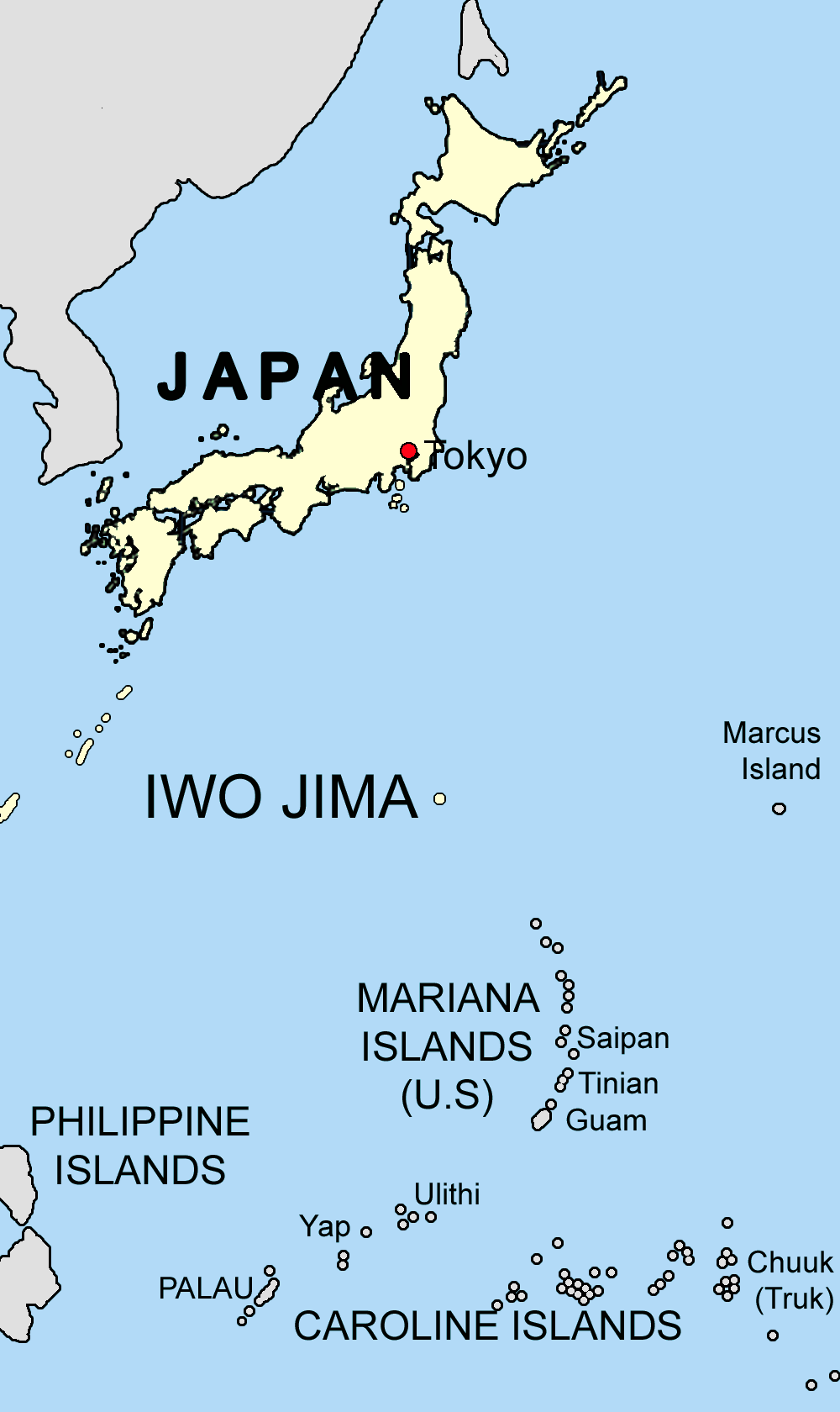
A map of Japan and the Carolines

South Pacific islands in 1945

== See also ==
- Operation Tan No. 2
- US Naval Advance Bases
