= Namoneas =

Island region in Chuuk State, Federated States of Micronesia

Native name: Nómwoneyas
- Interactive map of Namoneas

Geography
- Location: Pacific Ocean
- Coordinates: 7°28′58″N 151°49′52″E
- Archipelago: Chuuk Islands
- Major islands: Piis-Paneu, Fono, Weno, Tonoas, Etten, Uman, Fefen, Siis, Parem, Totiw
- Area: 47.09 km^{2} (18.18 sq mi)
- Highest point: Mount Teroken (369 m)

Administration
- Federated States of Micronesia
- State: Chuuk State
- Electoral districts: Northern Namoneas, Southern Namoneas

Demographics
- Population: 24,853 (2010)
- Languages: Chuukese

Additional information
- Time zone: UTC (UTC+10)

Map of Namoneas islands (Piis-Paneu not pictured)

Namoneas (Chuukese: Nómwoneyas), also Nomoneas, is an island region in Chuuk State, Federated States of Micronesia (FSM). It consists of the 10 major islands and islets in the eastern half of Chuuk Lagoon, as well as many smaller islets and reefs in their vicinity. The islands cover a total land area of about 47.09 square kilometers (18.18 sq mi) and had a combined population of 24,853 at the 2010 census.

== Etymology ==
Namoneas translates to "upper or eastern archipelago." It is derived from the root words nómwo, referring to an enclosed body of water, and aas, meaning "upper part" or "eastern side." The stem ne- between the roots refers to place or location.

== Islands ==
The major islands and islets of Namoneas are listed below, organized by subregion. All except Totiw are inhabited.

Subregion	Island	Municipality	Area (km^{2})	Population (2010)	Highest point	Location
Northern Namoneas	Piis-Paneu	Piis-Paneu	0.32	376	<5 m	7°40′38″N 151°45′53″E
Northern Namoneas	Fono	Fonoton	0.34	388	Winimon (62 m)	7°29′3″N 151°52′55″E
Northern Namoneas	Weno	Weno-Choniro	18.91	13,856	Teroken (369 m)	7°26′24″N 151°52′8″E
Southern Namoneas	Tonoas	Tonoas	8.86	3,234	Tonomwan (344 m)	7°22′34″N 151°52′51″E
Southern Namoneas	Etten	Tonoas	0.49	283	Pweyinap (Note: This is the indigenous name for the hill given by Goodenough and Bryan; they also suggest Mt. Uinku, while the USGS map labels it as Unimas) (62 m)	7°21′24″N 151°53′7″E
Southern Namoneas	Uman	Uman-Fonuweisom	3.87	2,554	Uroras (282 m)	7°18′5″N 151°52′52″E
Southern Namoneas	Fefen	Fefen	12.07	3,471	Chuk en Ipar (Note: Known locally as Mt. Iron or Irow/Irou, although this is considered taboo) (300 m)	7°20′30″N 151°50′9″E
Southern Namoneas	Siis	Siis	0.49	349	Winipou (69 m)	7°17′54″N 151°49′27″E
Southern Namoneas	Parem	Parem	1.24	342	Nukeiton (55 m)	7°21′38″N 151°47′27″E
Southern Namoneas	Totiw	Parem	0.50	n/a	Senani (39 m)	7°20′28″N 151°46′47″E

== Administration ==
The two major subdivisions of Namoneas form the Northern and Southern Namoneas electoral districts. They are two of five electoral districts in Chuuk State and two of 10 in the greater FSM. Similar to the other districts, Northern and Southern Namoneas each elect a senator every two years to serve in the Congress of the Federated States of Micronesia.

Namoneas is further broken down into representative districts based on population and geographical configuration:

- Representative District 1 – Consists of the Northern Namoneas islands (Piis-Paneu, Fono, and Weno).
- Representative District 2 – Consists of Tonoas and Etten.
- Representative District 3 – Consists of Fefen, Parem, Siis, and Totiw.
- Representative District 4 – Consists of Uman.

Representative District 1 is by far the largest district in Namoneas and is allotted five members in the Chuuk State House of Representatives. Representative Districts 2 and 4 are both allotted two members, while Representative District 3 is allotted three members.
