= Hiroko Mori =

Micronesian politician (born 1937)

Senator in the Chuuk State Legislature
- In office March 1975 – March 1986
- Preceded by: ?
- Succeeded by: Fasy Nethon
- Constituency: Precinct 4 (Uman)

Personal details
- Born: July 3, 1937 (age 88) Chuuk, South Seas Mandate, Empire of Japan
- Education: Pacific Islands Central School

Hiroko Mori (born July 3, 1937) is a Micronesian clerk and politician who served as a senator in the Chuuk State Legislature from 1975 until 1986. When she left office, Mori was the only woman in the state legislature and the only female state senator in the entire country. Mori was also a prominent women's activist, serving as president of the Trukese American Women's Association and assisting the wives of local farmers.

== Biography ==
Hiroko Mori was born on July 3, 1937, in Chuuk State in Micronesia, then part of Japan's South Seas Mandate. After attending grade school in Uman and intermediate school in Moen, she attended the Pacific Islands Central School from 1954 until 1956. After graduating, Mori became a teacher at the elementary school in Uman – the same school she attended – for two years. She then worked as a clerk in the Chuuk State Department of Public Safety for three years, overseeing a period where no women were arrested for felonies.

From 1970 until 1975, Mori worked as a clerk for the state Department of Agriculture. In this role, she was an organizer and judge for Three Fairs Day, an event "which celebrates the accomplishments of farmers, fishermen, and handicraft artists". She also hosted cooking classes in Fefan for the wives of local farmers, aiming to introduce new techniques and recipes to take advantage of new crops. Around this period, Mori was elected president of the Trukese American Women's Association, a nonprofit organization which sought to "increase cultural understanding and provide a place where women could exchange ideas on a variety of topics of mutual interest", and raised funds for local hospitals, prisoners, and churches. She also helped form other women's groups in the state.

In the 1975 state election, Mori was elected as a senator to the Chuuk State Legislature, representing Precinct 4 (Uman). She was re-elected three times, and was a member of the ways and means committee. Mori lost re-election in the 1986 election to Fasy Nethon. At the time of her loss, she was the only woman in the state legislature and the only female state senator in the entire country.
