= Kuop =

Island in Chuuk State, Federal States of Micronesia

Coordinates: 7°03′32″N 151°55′09″E

Location of Kuop Atoll in the Pacific Ocean

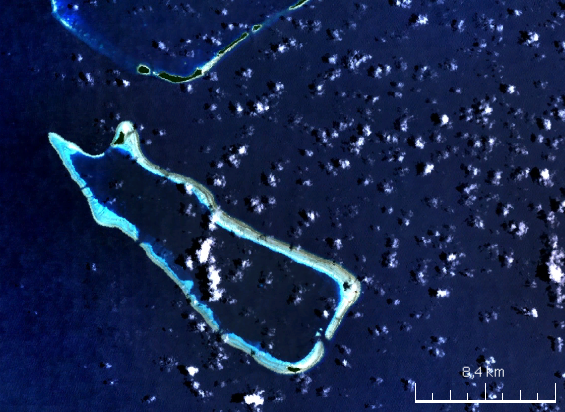
Kuop Atoll from space. Courtesy NASA.

Kuop or Neoch is an atoll in the state of Chuuk, Federated States of Micronesia. Its area of 0.5 km^{2} is uninhabited.

== Geography ==
The atoll is 21.5 km in length with a maximum width of 8 km and is located only 3 km to the south of Chuuk atoll's southernmost point.

=== Islands ===
There are 2 small islands and two islets with a total area of 0.5 km^{2} on its reef. Givry, also known as Feneppi, the largest island, is located at the northern end of the atoll. Kuop is uninhabited; administratively it belongs to Uman municipality.

== History ==
Kuop was believed to have been discovered by Spanish navigator Alonso de Arellano in 1565.

At the time of World War II during Operation Hailstone on February 4, 1944, the Japanese destroyer Tachikaze ran aground on Kuop Atoll's reef and later sank.

As a desert island, Kuop is officially the largest marine protected area in Micronesia and continues to be right up to the present day.
