= Pulap =

Atoll in Chuuk State, Federal States of Micronesia

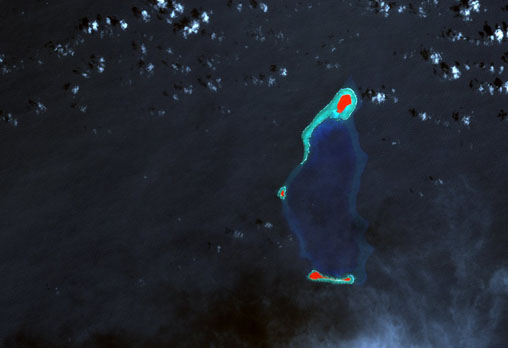
- Landsat picture of Pulap Atoll

- Location within Federated States of Micronesia

Geography
- Coordinates: 7.6383°N 149.4294°E
- Area: 31.321 km^{2} (12.093 sq mi)

Administration
- Federated States of Micronesia
- State: Chuuk

Demographics
- Demonym: Pulapese
- Population: 1,270 (2000)

Pulap or Pollap is an atoll in Chuuk State, Federated States of Micronesia, with a total area (including the lagoon) of 31.321 km^{2} (12.1 sq mi), of which 0.992 km^{2} (0.4 sq mi) is emergent land, consisting of three islands, Pollap in the north, Tamatam in the south, and Fanadik at the western fringe of the reef. The atoll is located in the Pattiw group in the Caroline Islands, located about 140 miles (230 km) to the west of Chuuk.

The atoll consists of the two municipalities Pollap (in the north) and Tamatam (in the south). The total population as of the census of population in 2000 was 1,270, of which 905 were in Pollap and 365 in Tamatam municipalities.

== History ==
The first recorded sighting of Pulap Atoll was by the Spanish navigator Alonso de Arellano on 17 January 1565 on board of the patache San Lucas. In a Spanish chart of 1879 this atoll appears as Los Martires (The Martyrs in Spanish).

In April 2016, three shipwrecked sailors were rescued from Fanadik after spelling out HELP with palm leaves. They had been stranded for three days after their vessel was overturned by a large wave after departing Pulap island, forcing them to swim two miles to shore at night. They were rescued by the U.S. Navy and Coast Guard after a passing plane spotted the message and notified the authorities.
