= Ngulu Atoll =

Pacific atoll in Yap State, Federated States of Micronesia

Coordinates: 8°27′N 137°29′E

Ngulu
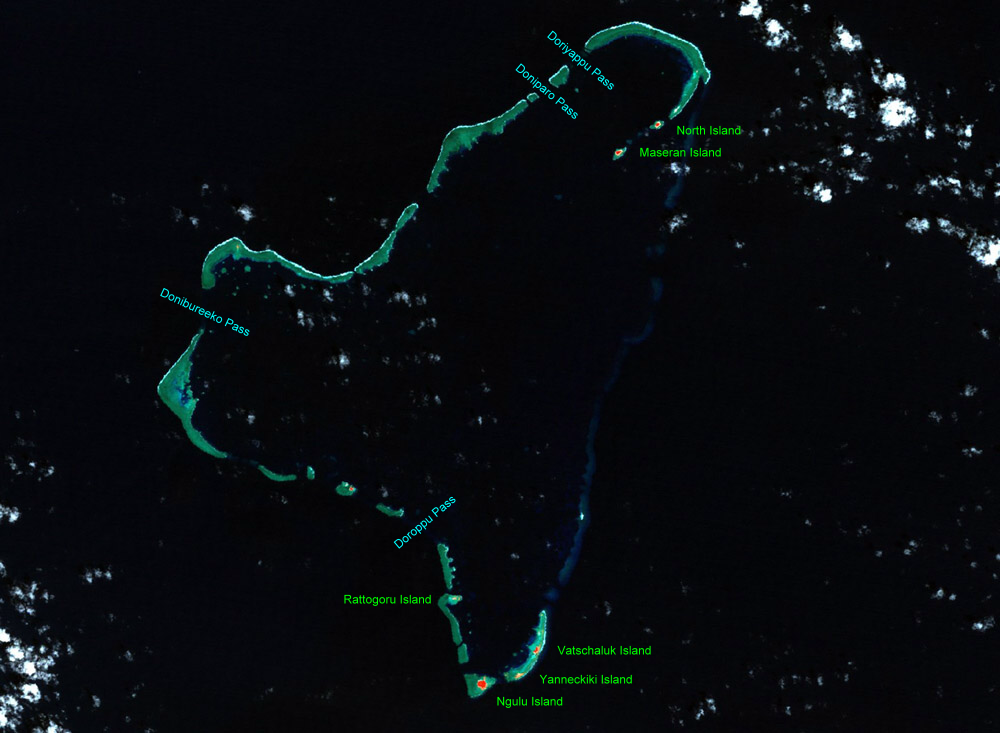
- NASA picture of Ngulu Atoll

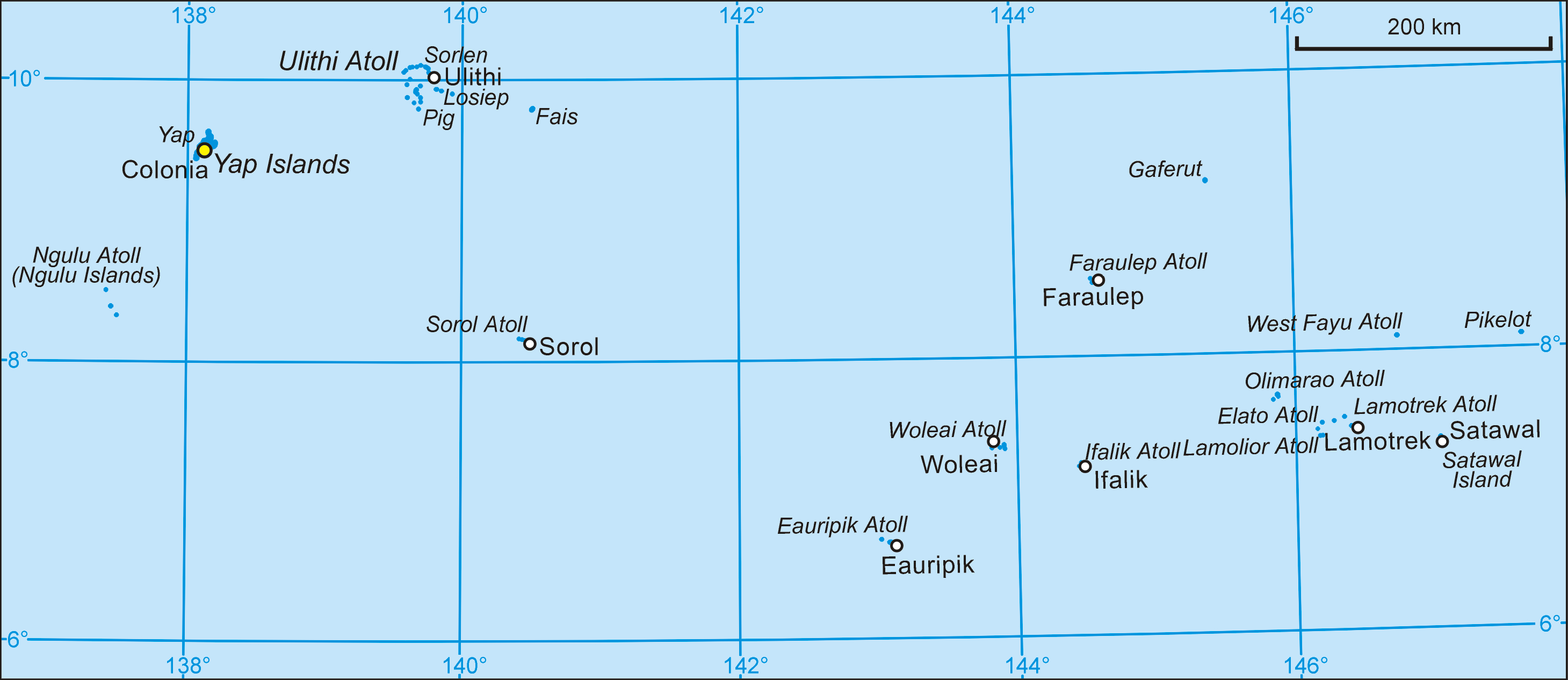

Geography
- Location: North Pacific
- Archipelago: Caroline
- Total islands: 9
- Area: 0.4 km^{2} (0.15 sq mi)
- Highest elevation: 2 m (7 ft)

Administration
- Federated States of Micronesia

Demographics
- Population: 26 (2000)
- Ethnic groups: Micronesian

Ngulu Atoll is a coral atoll of three islands in the Caroline Islands in the Pacific Ocean, and forms a legislative district in Yap State in the Federated States of Micronesia. Ngulu extends for 36 kilometers (22 mi) by 22 kilometers (14 mi) with 18 reef segments enclosing a deep central lagoon of 382 square kilometers (147 sq mi). The eastern portion of the reef is deeply submerged. Its total land area of the nine islets is only 0.4 square kilometers (0.15 sq mi). Nugulu is located approximately 104 kilometers (65 mi) south-southwest of Yap and is the westernmost atoll in the Federated States of Micronesia. The population of Ngulu was 26 in 2000.

Location of Ngulu in the Pacific Ocean

== History ==
First recorded sighting of Ngulu Atoll was by the Spanish navigator Alonso de Arellano on 23 January 1565 on board of the patache San Lucas. In 1802 it was explored by Spanish naval officer Don Juan Lafita.

As with all of the Caroline Islands, sovereignty was sold by Spain to the Empire of Germany in 1899. The island came under the control of the Empire of Japan after World War I, and was subsequently administered under the South Seas Mandate. Following World War II, the island came under the control of the United States of America and was administered as part of the Trust Territory of the Pacific Islands from 1947, and became part of the Federated States of Micronesia from 1979.
