= Southern Namoneas High School =

Location
- Sapore, Fefen, Chuuk State; Micronesia
- Coordinates: 7.3173916°N 151.85219189999998°E

Information
- Type: High school
- School district: Chuuk State Department of Education

Southern Namoneas High School (SNHS) is a secondary school in Fefen Island, Chuuk State, Federated States of Micronesia. It is a part of the Chuuk State Department of Education.

Construction began by 1970. The fiscal year 1972 program related to the Trust Territory of the Pacific Islands funded the construction of a shop building and four classrooms, with a total of $82,200 spent.

== See also ==
- Education in the Federated States of Micronesia
