= Chuuk High School =

Location
- Weno, Chuuk State; Federated States of Micronesia
- 7.4505481°N 151.85212439999998°E

Information
- Type: High school
- School district: Chuuk State Department of Education

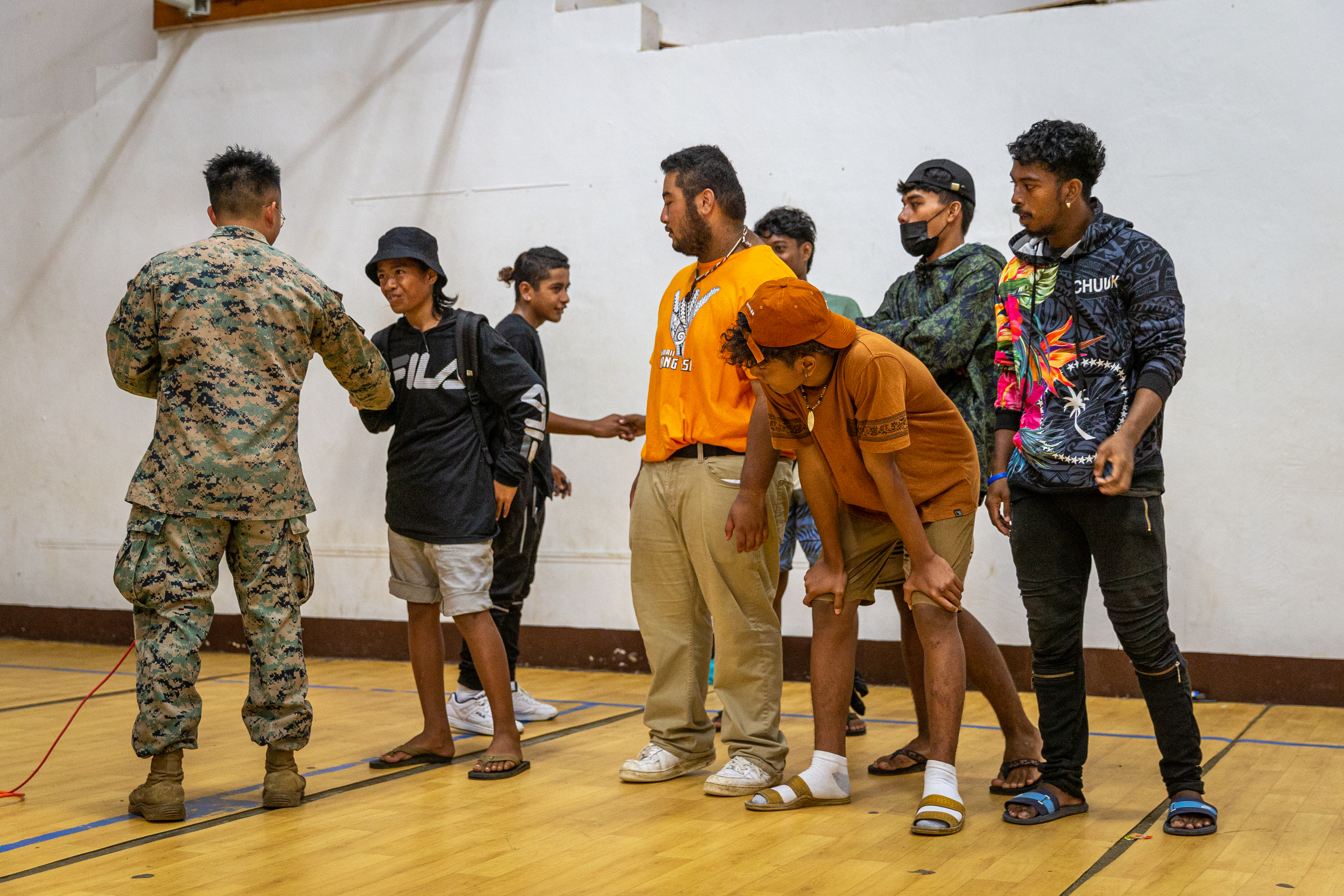
A marine thanking Chuuk High School students for taking part in a ‘Marines vs. students’ plank challenge during a recruiting event, 2023

Chuuk High School (CHS), formerly Truk High School, is a secondary school in Weno, Chuuk Lagoon, Chuuk State, Federated States of Micronesia. It is a part of the Chuuk State Department of Education.

Its original facility was built between the late 1960s to the middle of the 1970s, a period when several other public high schools were built in the Trust Territory of the Pacific Islands. By 1970 a Korean construction company was building three buildings.

It is at the foothill of Mount Tonachau, in the island's northwest. In 1995 it had about 1,200 students. At the time it required prospective students to take an admissions test as there were not enough resources to admit all prospective students. As of that year most of the students matriculated from Weno's junior high school. At the time it was Chuuk State's sole public high school.

== See also ==
- Education in the Federated States of Micronesia
