= Pis-Losap =

Municipality in Chuuk State, Federal States of Micronesia

Coordinates: 6.8713°N 152.7035°E

Pis-Losap is a village and municipality in the state of Chuuk, Federated States of Micronesia.
