= Andrés de Urdaneta =

Basque explorer for the Spanish Empire

The Reverend Andrés de Urdaneta OSA
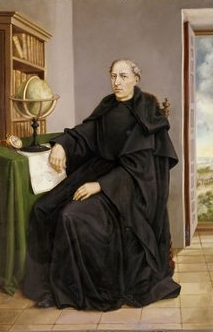
- Born: 1508; Ordizia, Gipuzkoa, Crown of Castile
- Died: 3 June 1568 (aged 59–60); Mexico City, Viceroyalty of New Spain
- Occupations: Explorer; friar
- Known for: Discoverer of the Kuroshio Current that allowed Eastward crossing of the Pacific

Signature
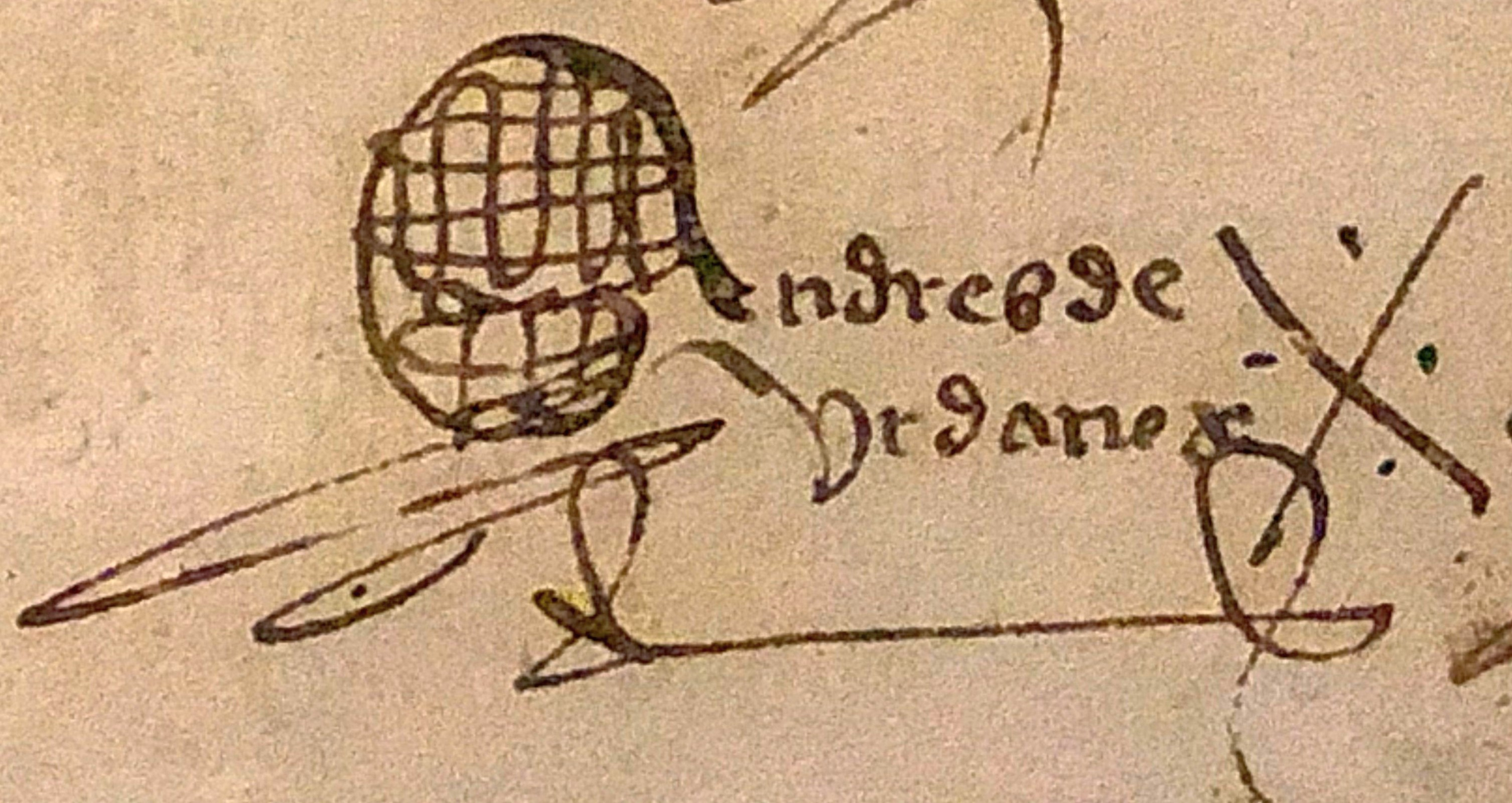

Andrés de Urdaneta, OSA (1508 – June 3, 1568) was a Basque maritime explorer for the Spanish Empire who later became an Augustinian friar.

At the age of 17, he formed part of the Loaísa expedition to the Spice Islands, where he spent more than eight years. Around 1540, he settled in New Spain and became an Augustinian friar in 1552. At the request of Philip II, he joined the Legazpi expedition to the Philippines. In 1565, Urdaneta discovered and plotted an easterly route across the Pacific Ocean, from the Philippines to Acapulco in the Viceroyalty of New Spain (though his discovery alone was made first by Alfonso de Arellano, another Spanish explorer who originally accompanied Legazpi before deserting ahead). The route made it practical for Spain to colonize the Philippines and was used as the Manila galleon trade route for more than two hundred years.

Urdaneta played an important role in establishing the Catholic faith in the Philippines and was considered a "protector of the Indians" for his treatment of the Philippine natives.

== Early life ==
Andrés de Urdaneta was born in 1508, near Ordizia, a Basque town then known as Villafranca, in the Crown of Castile. He was well-connected in society. His father, Juan Ochoa de Urdaneta, served as mayor of Villafranca and his mother, Gracia de Cerain, came from a family of good standing in the region. He received his education in Ordizia.

== Loaísa expedition ==
When he was seventeen, Urdaneta was invited to join the Loaísa expedition, serving as a page to Juan Sebastián Elcano, the Basque mariner who had recently captained the first ship to circumnavigate the globe. Almost as soon as Elcano returned from his historic voyage in 1522, a second expedition was commissioned by Emperor Charles V to return to the Spice Islands and secure a Spanish foothold in the lucrative spice trade. García Jofre de Loaísa was appointed commander of the expedition and Elcano was appointed pilot-major of the fleet and captain of the second-largest ship.

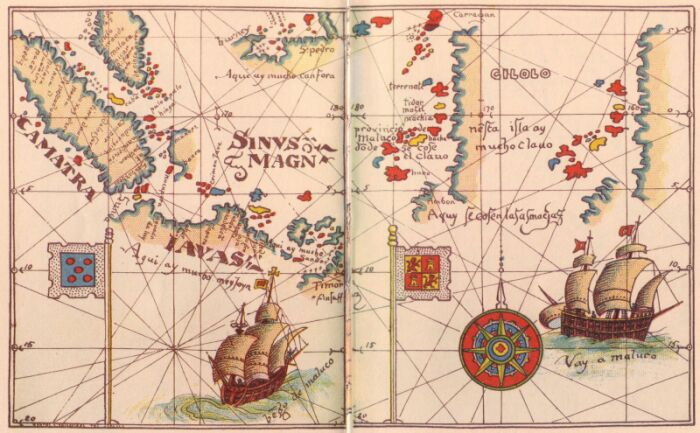
Detail of the 1529 Padron Real illustrating the Spanish claim that the Spice Islands actually fell within the Spanish rather than Portuguese sphere.

The seven-ship fleet left the harbor of A Coruña on July 24, 1525. Much of what is known about the expedition and its aftermath comes from Urdaneta's detailed journals and charts. The voyage was long and difficult. Two ships deserted rather than risk passage through the Magellan Straits and four ships were lost to terrible storms encountered in the Pacific. A year into the voyage the crew suffered from scurvy and both Loaísa and Elcano died. By the time the one remaining ship, Santa Maria de la Victoria, reached the Spice Islands in October 1526, only 105 of the original 450 crewmen remained.

The expedition found that the Portuguese had already established a presence on Ternate. For the next several years, the Spaniards and Portuguese contended for control of the islands and the lucrative spice trade. Despite his relative youth, Urdaneta was assigned a variety of important roles. He acted as an emissary to the local leaders in hopes of building alliances against the Portuguese; he was sent on numerous reconnaissance missions to gain an understanding of the geography, trade, and sailing routes of the region; and he led numerous sorties against the Portuguese. During one fight, a keg of gunpowder exploded, severely burning Urdaneta and permanently disfiguring him.

Urdaneta and the dwindling remnants of the expedition remained in the Spice Islands for more than eight years, fighting a losing effort against the Portuguese to maintain a presence in the region. Unbeknownst to them, in 1529 Charles V signed the Treaty of Zaragoza which effectively recognized Portuguese control of the Spice Islands. Late in 1530, when Urdaneta first learned of the treaty from the new Portuguese commander, Gonçalo de Pereira, he refused to believe it.

Gradually, the Spaniards came to accept the fact that their cause had been abandoned by their king. After further threats and negotiations, the Portuguese agreed in 1534 to repatriate the surviving members of the Loaísa expedition. On February 15, 1535, Urdaneta left the Spice Islands on a Chinese junk bound for Java. From Java he traveled to Malacca and then Cochin where he boarded a Portuguese spice ship, the Sao Roque, and returned to Europe.

On June 26, 1536, Urdaneta reached Lisbon where all his maps and journals were confiscated by the Portuguese authorities. The Spanish ambassador warned him it was dangerous to remain in Portugal, so he fled across the border to Spain at his earliest opportunity. In addition to his papers, Urdaneta left behind an illegitimate daughter, conceived with an Indian woman in the Spice Islands.

When he arrived in Valladolid, Urdaneta was interviewed by the Council of the Indies and wrote an extensive report detailing the events of the expedition and adding information regarding regional geography, trade, history and anthropology. The council was satisfied with his report, completed in February, 1537, and impressed by the detail and clarity of his narrative. Nevertheless, it must have been disappointing to be awarded only 60 gold ducats by the Crown for his eleven years of service.

== New Spain ==
While still in Valladolid, Urdaneta met Pedro de Alvarado, a celebrated conquistador and then-governor of Guatemala. Alvarado was preparing an expedition to cross the Pacific in search of new opportunities for trade and conquest. He was assembling a fleet of vessels on the Pacific coast of New Spain and invited Urdaneta to serve as chief navigator. Urdaneta quickly accepted the offer and set sail for the New World on October 16, 1538. In transit, he stopped at Hispaniola where he related the story of the Loaísa expedition to historian Gonzalo Fernández de Oviedo.

By June, 1540, the Alvarado expedition was ready to sail for Asia when word arrived from Cristóbal de Oñate that a serious native rebellion in New Galicia threatened to overwhelm Spanish control of the region. Alvarado disembarked with his soldiers and marched to aid Oñate. Urdaneta was appointed captain of 150 infantrymen and cavalry. The rebellion was put down but Alvarado was killed in the fighting.

After Alvarado's death, Viceroy Antonio de Mendoza divided the ships into two fleets and ordered one to the Philippines under Ruy López de Villalobos and the other to explore the coast of North America under the command of Juan Rodríguez Cabrillo. Urdaneta took no part in either venture, but remained in New Spain working for the viceroy on a variety of assignments. In 1543 he was appointed corregidor (commissioner) of a district in Michoacán. In the same year Urdaneta was appointed visitador (auditor), an important office that reported directly to the viceroy and was responsible for investigating official corruption, mistreatment of the natives, or other misdeeds.

Urdaneta also remained interested in maritime activities in the Pacific. In 1543, when the survivors of the Cabrillo expedition returned from California, Urdaneta interviewed them about the journey and wrote what became the only surviving manuscript account of the voyage. In 1547, Urdaneta was appointed commander of a fleet and ordered to put down the revolt of Gonzalo Pizarro in Peru. Just as he was ready to sail with six hundred men, word was received that Pizarro had been defeated in battle on April 18, 1548.

Urdaneta's career took a surprising turn in 1552, when he set aside his secular life and joined the Augustinians, a Catholic religious order that observed a strict vow of poverty and focused on education and missionary work. After a year as a novice, Urdaneta professed his religious vows in 1553 and was ordained a priest in 1557. In 1558 he was appointed master of novices at the Priory of San Augustin, where he was responsible for the education of the novices.

== Legazpi expedition ==
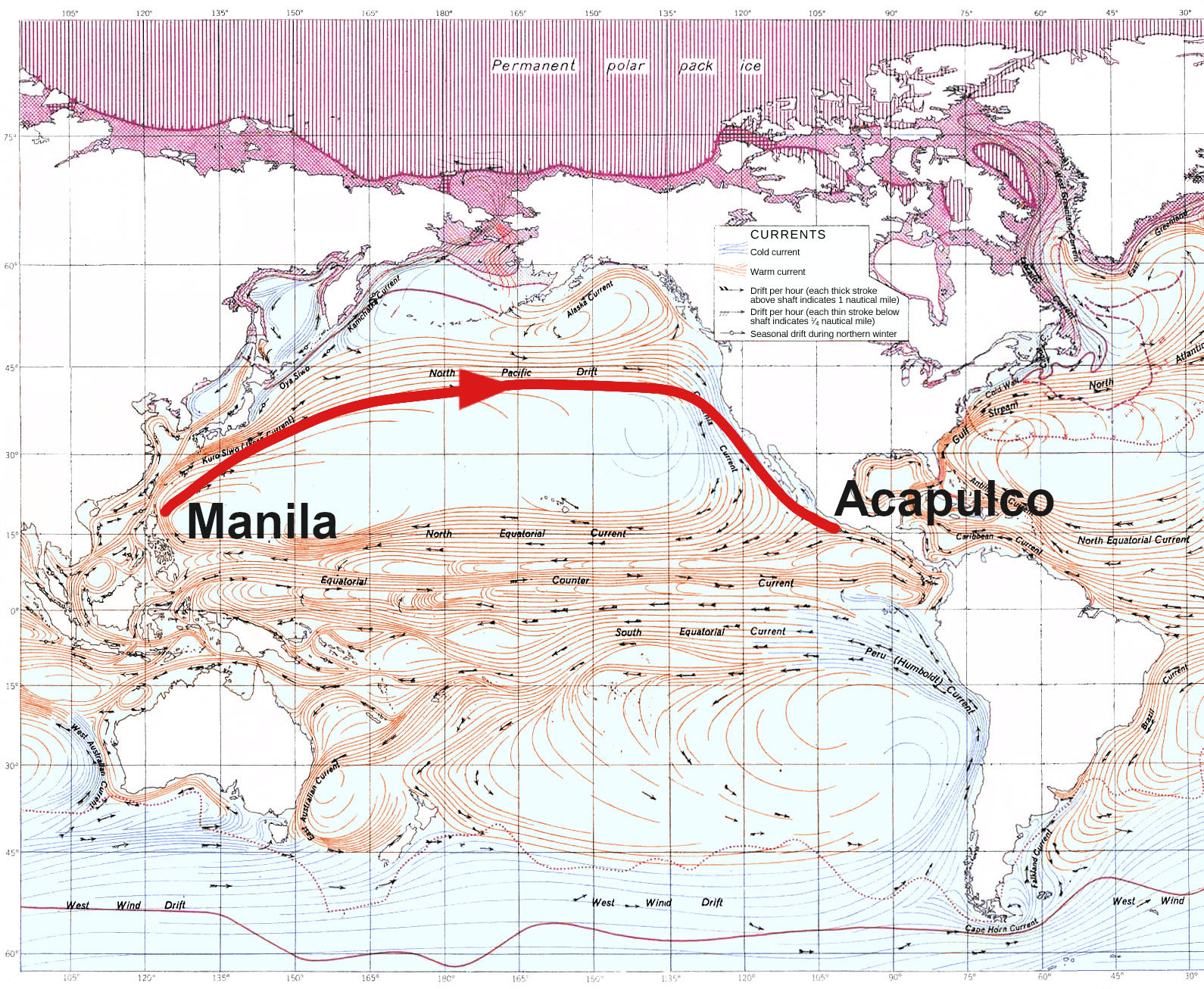
Route from the Philippines to Acapulco, Mexico

In 1558, Viceroy Luís de Velasco wrote to Philip II and suggested that an expedition should be sent from Mexico to "the Islands of the West" (the Philippines). Velasco was convinced that the islands were in the Spanish sphere of control and would be a valuable addition to the Spanish empire. Velasco further suggested that Urdaneta would be the ideal leader of the initiative because of his previous experience in the region and his knowledge of navigation, geography, and native languages. Philip agreed with the proposal and in 1559 ordered Velasco to assemble a fleet and secure the services of Urdaneta. He also wrote directly to Urdaneta, summarizing Urdaneta's qualifications for the job and ending with the directive "I therefore command, and entrust you, to go in the said ships, and to do as the Viceroy may require of you further in the service of Our Lord."

After receiving permission from his religious superiors, Urdaneta agreed to accompany the expedition but declined to lead it. Based on Urdaneta's recommendation, the viceroy appointed Miguel López de Legazpi to command the initiative. Urdaneta would participate as an advisor and lead a small group of Augustine missionaries to establish the Catholic Church and evangelize the Pacific islanders. After years of delay, a small fleet was eventually assembled in 1564, consisting of two galleons, the San Pablo and San Pedro, and two smaller vessels called pataches, the San Juan and San Lucas. The ships set sail from La Navidad, Mexico, on November 21, 1564 with 150 seamen and 200 soldiers.

Like most early Pacific crossings, the voyage was long and difficult. In addition to spoiled food and a shortage of drinking water, scurvy afflicted the crew. Urdaneta's expertise and experience was essential to keeping them on course. The ships' pilots consistently overestimated their progress and derided Urdaneta when he (correctly) argued that the fleet was far short of where they estimated. When they anchored off Guam on January 23, 1565, the pilots were convinced they had reached the Philippines. Urdaneta recognized the lateen sails of the native vessels from his previous visit and knew they had reached Guam. They remained there for about a week while Urdaneta celebrated Mass daily and explored the coast. He urged Legazpi to establish a permanent settlement on Guam that could serve as a base for further exploration of the region. Legazpi refused the suggestion but took formal possession for Castile and then ordered the expedition to proceed to the Philippines.

The fleet left Guam on 3 February 1565 and reached the Philippines at Samar on 13 February. After taking formal possession, they continued to explore the islands. As a result of earlier Portuguese slave raids, they found a hostile reception wherever they went ashore. Finally, Legazpi established a fortified settlement on Cebu, where food was plentiful and a commercial center for trade with China was already in place. Importantly, Urdaneta advised it would be a suitable starting point for a return voyage to New Spain.

Urdaneta founded the first churches in the Philippines, the St. Vitales Church and the Basilica del Santo Niño; he served as the first prelate of the Church in Cebu.

=== Return voyage ===
After the Cebu settlement was established, Legazpi determined it was time to attempt a return voyage to New Spain. As planned, Urdaneta was the chief advisor and Legazpi's seventeen-year-old grandson, Felipe de Salcedo, was named commander of the San Pedro, their largest ship and the one in best condition to face the difficult trip home. Per Urdaneta's recommendation, they left Cebu on 1 June 1565, an ideal time to catch the south-west monsoon winds but avoid the typhoons that occurred later in the season. The ship carried a crew of 200 and enough food and water for up to nine months. They also loaded a small cargo of spices collected in the Philippines.

On the first leg of their journey they threaded their way through the dangerous passages of the Philippine archipelago. After reaching clear water, the San Pedro sailed northeast to the 38th parallel where the ship encountered favorable westerly winds that carried them across the Pacific. The passage was slow but uneventful. After considerable debate as to where they were in relation to the coast of North America, they finally spotted Catalina Island on 18 September 1565. From there, they followed the coast and reached Acapulco on 8 October 1565, completing a voyage of four months and eight days. Most of the crew was suffering from scurvy and only 18 remained strong enough to sail the ship.

Upon his arrival, Urdaneta was surprised to learn that another ship in their expedition, captained by Alonso de Arellano, had actually beaten them back to New Spain, arriving at Barra de Navidad in Jalisco in August of the same year. However, Arellano was suspected of mutiny and desertion and his account of the return voyage was vague and imprecise. Urdaneta was ultimately recognized as the pioneer of the return route, based on his detailed notes and his solid reputation as a geographer and navigator.

== Later years ==
Urdaneta's successful voyage from the Philippines was acknowledged a great feat and widely celebrated in New Spain. He returned to his monastery in Mexico City where he was able to rest and recover from the difficult trip. In January, 1566, he embarked from Vera Cruz for Spain. Urdaneta stopped at Havana and gave an account of his voyage to Pedro Menéndez de Avilés before reaching Spain in April 1566. In Seville, he gave his account to the Casa de Contratación and then proceeded to Madrid where he shared his experiences and observations with Philip II at the royal court.

Urdaneta sailed back to New Spain in 1567. His request to return to the Philippines and continue his missionary work was refused by his superior because of his age. He died at the friary in Mexico City on June 3, 1568.

== Legacy ==
He wrote two accounts of his voyages: one giving the account of the Loaisa expedition was published; the other, which gives the account of his return voyage, is preserved in manuscript in the archives of the Council of the Indies.

For more than 200 years, Spanish ships, particularly the annual Manila-Acapulco trading Galleon, used "Urdaneta's route."

In the Philippines, the city of Urdaneta in Pangasinan was founded in 1858 but there is uncertainty whether it was named after Andrés de Urdaneta.

== URDANETA Satellite ==
The Urdaneta satellite, the first high-resolution optical satellite developed by the Basque Space Technology company SATLANTIS, is named after the Augustinian friar Andrés de Urdaneta, in honour of his spirit of discovery regarding the return route from the Philippines across the Pacific Ocean. It carries the iSIM-90, a small high-resolution binocular telescope for Earth observation. The satellite consists of 16 cubes, each 10 cm wide, measuring 20 cm in width and 40 cm in height, with deployable solar panels. It was successfully launched on May 25, 2022, from Cape Canaveral Space Force Station as part of SpaceX's Transporter-5 mission. Subsequently, the satellite became part of an agreement with Armenia's Geocosmos company, adopting the name Armsat-1.

Ref. https://www.satlantis.com/urdaneta-launch/

== See also ==
- Exploration of the Pacific
- Manila galleon
- North Pacific Gyre
- Volta do mar
