= Tol, Federated States of Micronesia =

Village and municipality on Tol, Chuuk, Federated States of Micronesia

Tol is a village and municipality on Tol Island in Chuuk State in the Federated States of Micronesia.
