= Tamatam =

Island in Chuuk State, Federal States of Micronesia

Coordinates: 7.5385°N 149.4142°E

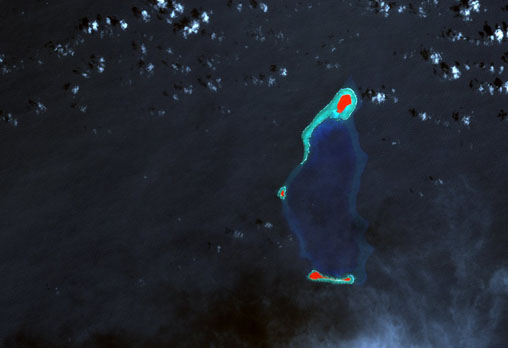
Tamatam

Tamatam or Tamatan is an island, village and municipality in the state of Chuuk, Federated States of Micronesia.
