= Chuuk State Department of Education =

Agency of Chuuk State, Federated States of Micronesia

Chuuk State Department of Education is an agency of Chuuk State, Federated States of Micronesia. It is headquartered in Nantaku, Weno, Chuuk Island.

== Schools ==
High schools:

- Chuuk High School
- Faichuk High School
- Moch High School
- Mortlock High School
- Southern Namoneas High School (SNHS)
- Weno High School

Junior high schools:

- Halls Junior High School
- Lukeisel Junior High School
- Nomwenemu Junior High School
- Nomusofo Junior High School
- Pattiw Junior High School
- Polle, Paata, Onei Junior High School

Elementary schools:

- Amwachang Elementary School
- Chukuram Elementary School
- Epin/Nukaf Elementary School
- Eot Elementary School
- Ettal Elementary School
- Fananu Elementary School
- Fanapanges Elementary School
- Faro/Winifei Elementary School
- Fason Elementary School
- Fonoton Elementary School
- Foup Elementary School
- Houk Elementary School
- Iras Demo Elementary School
- Kuttu Elementary School
- Lekinioch Elementary School
- Losap Elementary School
- Makur Elementary School
- Manaio Elementary School
- Mechitiw Elementary School
- Moch Elementary School
- Munien/Nechocho Elementary School
- Murilo Elementary School
- Mwan Elementary School
- Namoluk Elementary School
- Neauo Elementary School
- Neirenomw Elementary School
- Nema Elementary School
- Nomwin Elementary School
- Oneop Elementary School
- Onou Elementary School
- Penia & Peniesene Elementary School
- Piis Paneu Elementary School
- Piisemwar Elementary School
- Polowat Elementary School
- Romanum Elementary School
- Sapota Paata Elementary School
- Sapou Elementary School
- Sapuk Elementary School
- Satowan Elementary School
- Ta Elementary School
- Teruo Bokuku Elementary School
- Udot Elementary School
- Wichukuno Elementary School
- Wonip Elementary School

Other:

- Akoyikoyi School

== See also ==
- Education in the Federated States of Micronesia
