= Tsis =

Municipality in Chuuk State, Federal States of Micronesia

Coordinates: 7.2985°N 151.8241°E

- Municipality
- Flag
- Interactive map of Tsis
- Country: Federated States of Micronesia
- State: Chuuk State

Tsis is a municipality of Chuuk, in the Federated States of Micronesia.

== Location ==
Tsis Island is locate near the center of Truk Lagoon in Chuuk State (Truk) in the Federated States of Micronesia. Also known as Siis Island. The island has a hill on the southern portion with an elevation of 248 ft. To the north is Fefan Island, to the east is Uman Island, to the south is Aualap Pass South Pass (South Passage) and Faleu Island. To the northwest is Tarik Island and Param Island.

== Wartime History ==
On the highest elevation of Tsis Island, the Imperial Japanese Army emplaced a single 75 mm Type 41 Mountain Gun in an open emplacement. This gun was angled to the east to provide artillery support to gun positions on Fefan Island. Tarik Island beaches were mined with ninety-two Army small model land mines to prevent landings. Occupied by the Japanese for the duration of the Pacific War.
