= Patache =

Type of sailing vessel

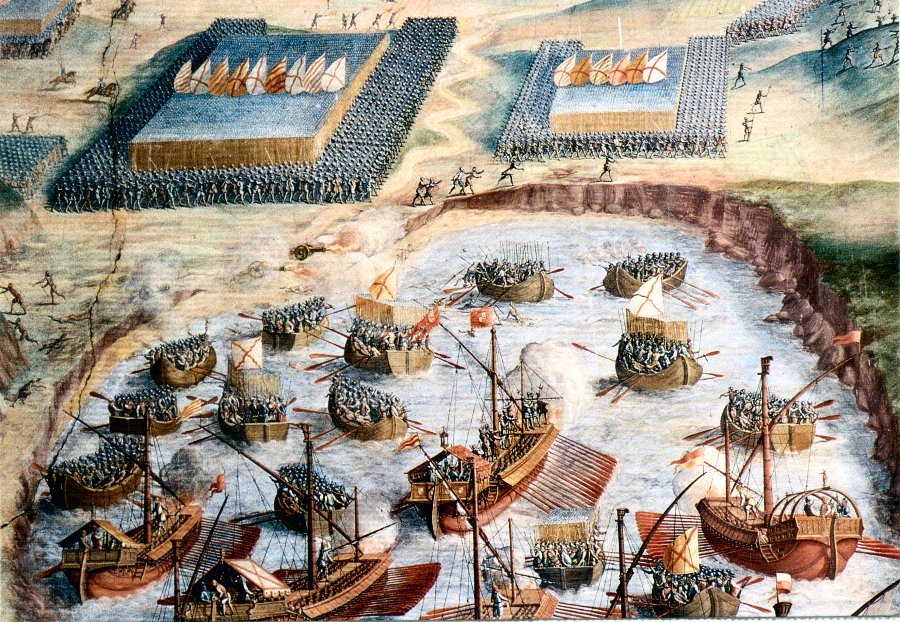
Spanish ships landing in the Battle of Ponta Delgada (Battle of Terceira Island) naval battle of 26 July 1582, between a Spanish fleet of 26 ships which included several pataches (tenders), commanded by Don Álvaro de Bazán, and a French fleet of 60, led by Admiral Philippe Strozzi, ending with a decisive victory for the Spanish

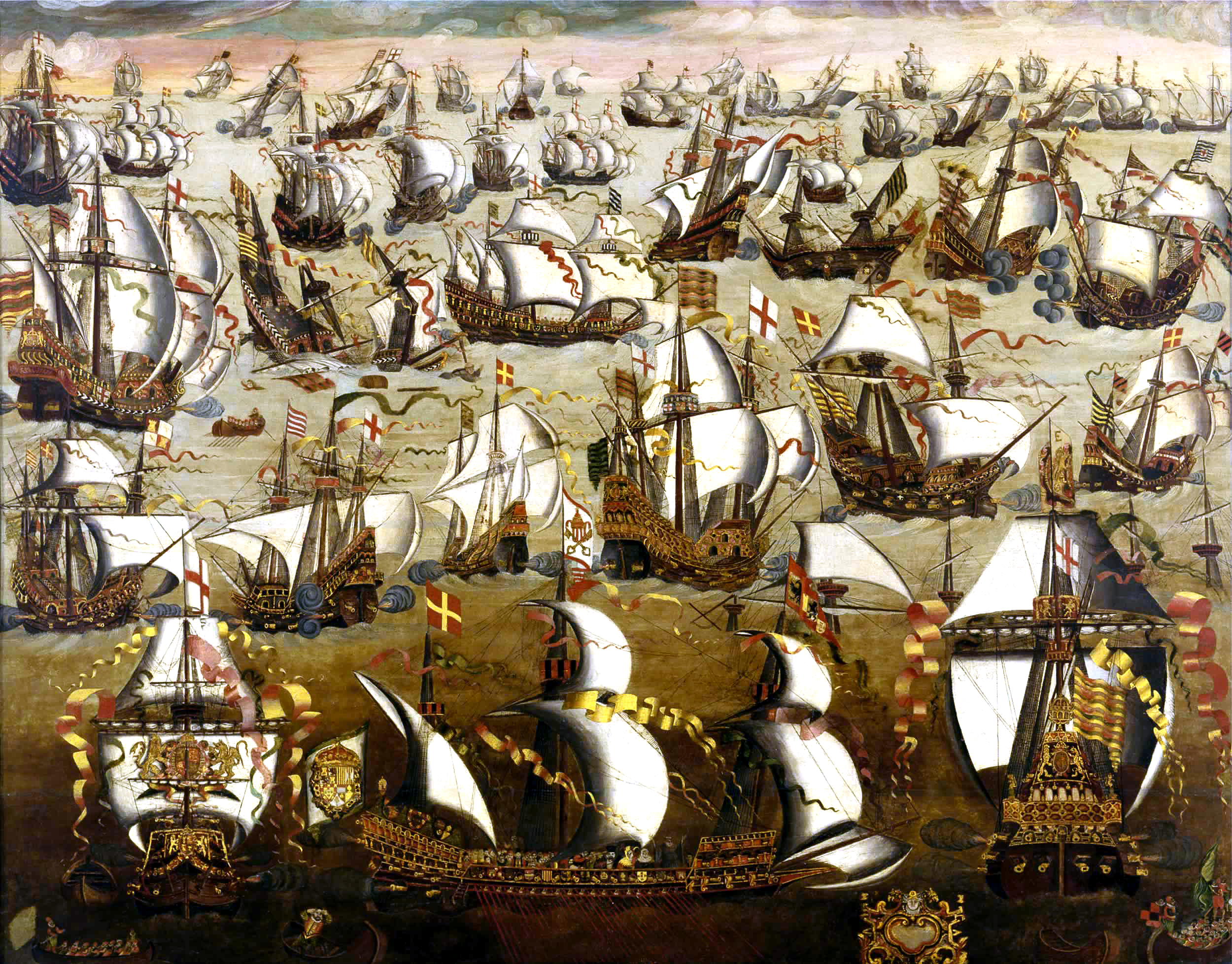
English painting of the attempted invasion of England, in the Anglo Spanish war of the late 16th century

A patache (occasionally "patax" or "pataje") is a type of sailing vessel with two masts, very light and shallow, a sort of cross between a brig and a schooner; it originally was a warship, being intended for surveillance and inspection of the coasts and ports. It was used as a tender to the fleet of vessels of more importance or size, and also for trans-Pacific travel, but later began to be used for trading voyages, carrying cargo burdens of 30 tons or more.

== History ==
Pataches were used by the Spanish Navy (Armada Española) in the 15th–18th centuries mainly for the protection and monitoring of the overseas territories of the Spanish Empire. Because of their lightness and speed of movement privateers favored them in attacking commercial vessels. Fleets of pataches participated in several historical battles:

- The attempted Spanish invasion of England by the Spanish Armada in 1588.
- The Battle of Ponta Delgada (Battle of Terceira Island) in 1582, between the French and Spanish.
- The Battle of Cape Gelidonya in 1616 featured one patache.
- They were part of Spain's Atlantic fleet, the Armada del Mar Océano from about 1700.
- The Battle of the Downs between the Spanish and Dutch navies was fought on 31 October 1639 in the roadstead of the Downs, the shoals near the coast of County Kent in England, in the course of the Eighty Years War.

== List of historical pataches ==
- Santiago, the smallest vessel in the Loaísa expedition to the Pacific in 1525–26. After losing sight of her sister ships on 1 June 1526, Santiago sailed north in a 10,000 kilometer voyage along the Pacific coast of South America, Central America and Mexico, becoming the first European vessel to pass within sight of North America's western coastline.
- San Lucas, piloted by Lope Martín and commanded by Alonso de Arellano, was part of the expedition of Miguel López de Legazpi to the Philippines in 1564. It is a matter of some contention whether it was this ship or Urdaneta's much larger nao, the San Pedro, that was first to discover the crucial return path (or tornaviaje) across the Pacific from the Philippines to New Spain.
- St. Nicholas, a frigate acquired by the Spanish crown in 1636 from Gabriel Tamaril.
- Galgo (Greyhound) and The Margarita, belonging to the Royal Navy Guard of the Indies run of the Spanish colonial convoy system, were stranded on the island of Bermuda in 1639.
- Buen Jesús, sent by the Spanish crown in 1648 from Panama to the Spanish colony of the Philippine Islands to discover if they had fallen into the hands of the Netherlands.
- Santa Cruz, part of the Tierra Firme Fleet, built in 1698 in the royal shipyards of Guayaquil, Ecuador; armed with 44 cannons and a crew of 300 sailors under the command of Nicolas de la Rosa, Count de Vega Florida.
- Nuestra Señora del Carmen (Our Lady of Carmen), commanded by Captain Araoz in 1708.
- Germain, sunk in 1898 in Portosín, Galicia.

== See also ==
- Spanish Armada
- Spanish treasure fleet
- Charles II of Spain
- Philip V of Spain
