= Uman, Federated States of Micronesia =

Municipality in Chuuk State

Coordinates: 7.3011°N 151.8805°E

Uman is a municipality of Chuuk, in the Federated States of Micronesia. It includes Uman Island and uninhabited Kuop Atoll.
