= Param, Federated States of Micronesia =

Island and municipality in Chuuk State

Coordinates: 7.3614°N 151.7898°E

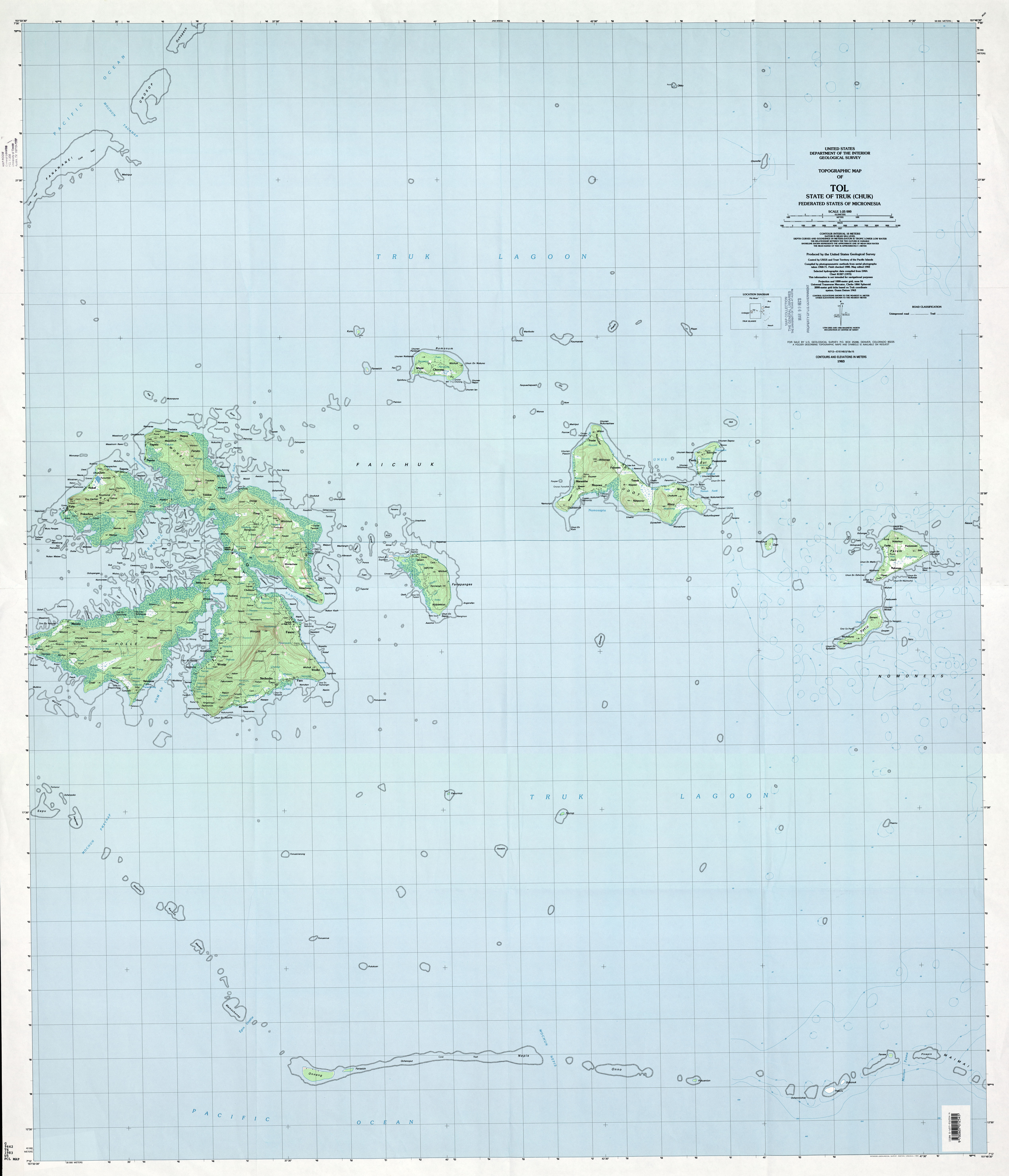
Parem in the eastern part of the map sheet

Param is a municipality and an island in the Southern Nomoneas (Shiki) Islands of Chuuk, Federated States of Micronesia.

Param municipality consists of Param Island, Totiw Island (800 meters (0.5 mi) to the south) and Oan Island (3 kilometers (1.9 mi) to the west).
