= Chuuk State =

State in the Federated States of Micronesia

- State
- Flag Seal

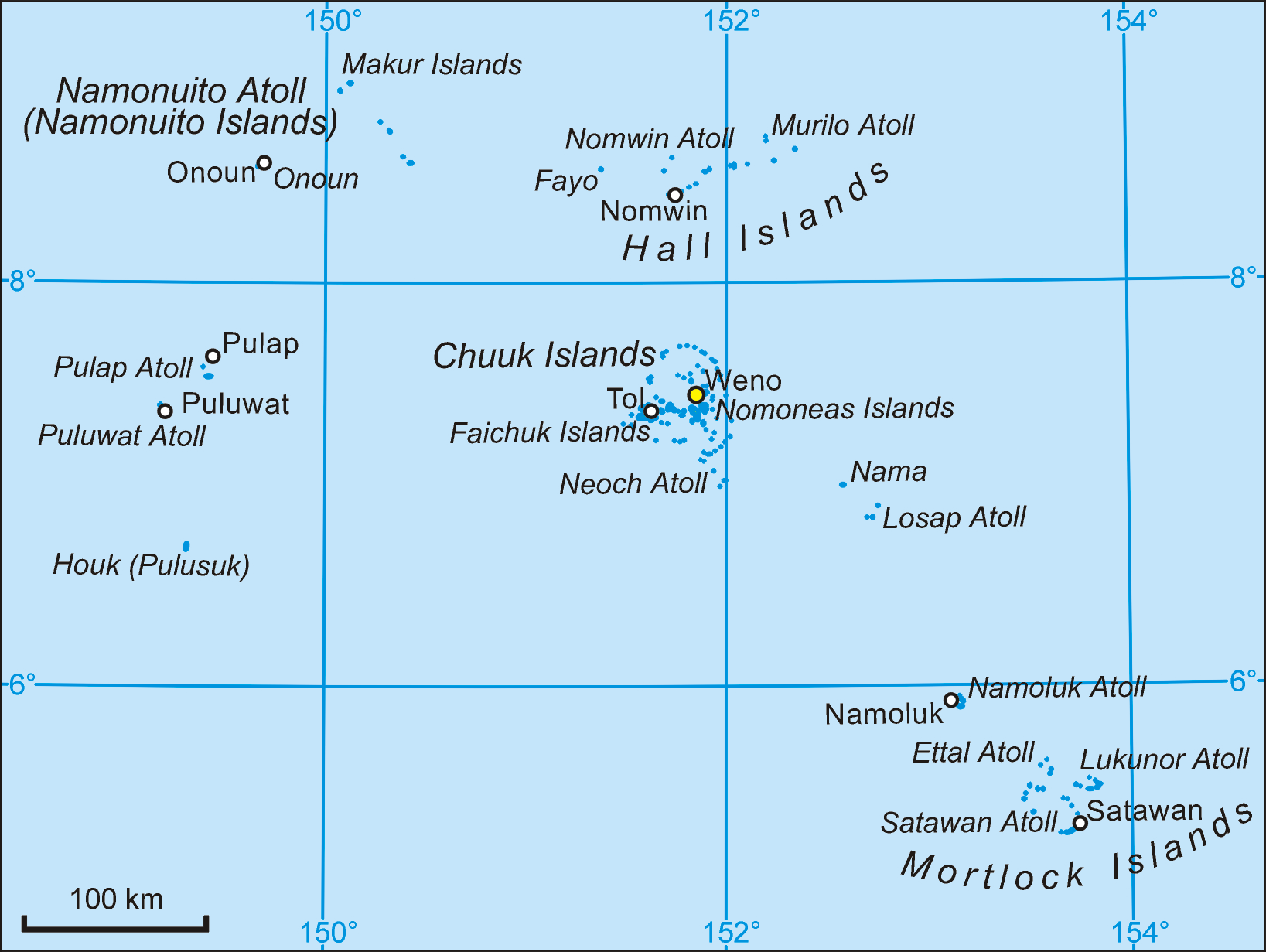
- Map of Chuuk State

- Chuuk in the Federated States of Micronesia
- Coordinates: 7°25′N 151°47′E
- Country: Federated States of Micronesia
- Capital: Weno

Government
  - Governor: Alexander R. Narruhn (since 2021)

Area
  - Total: 121.5 km^{2} (46.9 sq mi)

Population (2023)
  - Total: 33,885
  - Density: 278.9/km^{2} (722.3/sq mi)
- Time zone: UTC+10
- Postal code: 96942
- ISO 3166 code: FM-TRK
- Website: www.fm/chuuk.htm

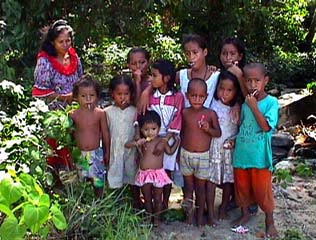
Chuukese children eating candy.

Chuuk State (/ˈtʃuːk/; also known as Truk) is one of the four states of the Federated States of Micronesia (FSM). It consists of several island groups: Nomoneas, Faichuuk, the Hall Islands, Namonuito Atoll (Magur Islands), Pattiw (Western Islands), and the Mortlock Islands. Chuuk is by far the FSM's most populous state, with 33,885 inhabitants on 120 square kilometers (46 square miles). Chuuk Lagoon is where most people live. Weno island, in the lagoon, is Chuuk's state capital and the country's biggest city. Since 2015 there has been a proposed referendum on independence, which has been repeatedly postponed.

== History ==
=== Indigenous settlement ===
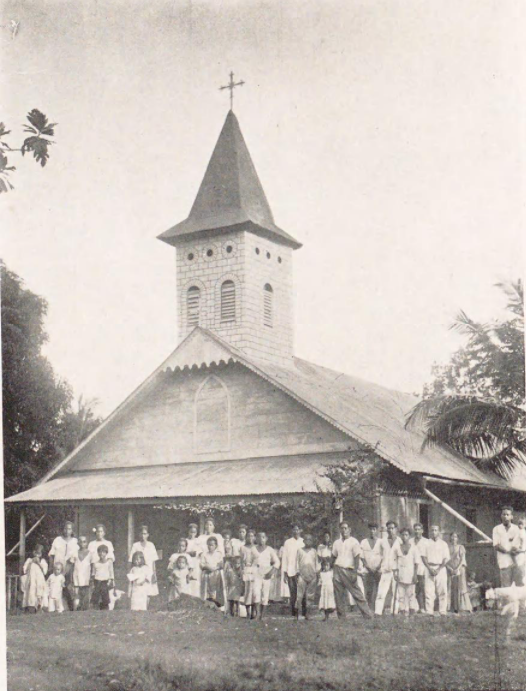
Catholic Church in Tonowas island, Chuuk (from a book published in 1932)

Chuuk was first settled by Austronesians, believed to be from the Lapita culture of Island Melanesia. Archaeological evidence indicates that islands of Feefen and Wééné Islands had human settlements in the second and first century BCE. Later evidence indicates that widespread human settlements appeared in Chuuk during the 14th century CE, as the Chuukese culture was formed.

=== Spanish colonization ===
The first sighting recorded by Europeans was made by the Spanish navigator Alvaro de Saavedra on board the Florida during August or September 1528. They were later visited by the Spaniard Alonso de Arellano on 15 January 1565 on board the galleon patache San Lucas.

As part of the Caroline Islands, Truk was claimed by the Spanish Empire, which struggled to control the islands in the late 19th century. The Chuuk Lagoon was then inhabited by Chuukese people (an Austronesian group) that participated in intermittent wars, as well as a small population of foreign merchants and missionaries, mostly linked to the Catholic Church. Spanish control over the islands was in part nominal. The Spanish stopped to raise a flag over Chuuk in 1886, and returned in 1895 as part of an attempt to assert control and negotiate peace between the tribes of Chuuk. No major Spanish settlement was established and traditional life continued until the German colonial era.

=== German and Japanese rule ===
The Caroline Islands were sold to the German Empire in 1899, after Spain withdrew from the Pacific after the Spanish–American War in which it lost its main colony in Asia, the Philippines. Germany incorporated the territory into its domain in the German New Guinea.

During World War I, the Imperial Japanese Navy was tasked with pursuing and destroying the East Asia Squadron of the Imperial German Navy and protecting the shipping lanes of Allied trade in the Pacific and Indian Oceans. During the course of this operation, the Japanese navy seized German possessions in the Mariana Islands, the Carolinas, the Marshall Islands and Palau groups by October 1914. Chuuk then became a possession of the Empire of Japan under the South Seas Mandate of the League of Nations after the defeat of Germany in World War I.

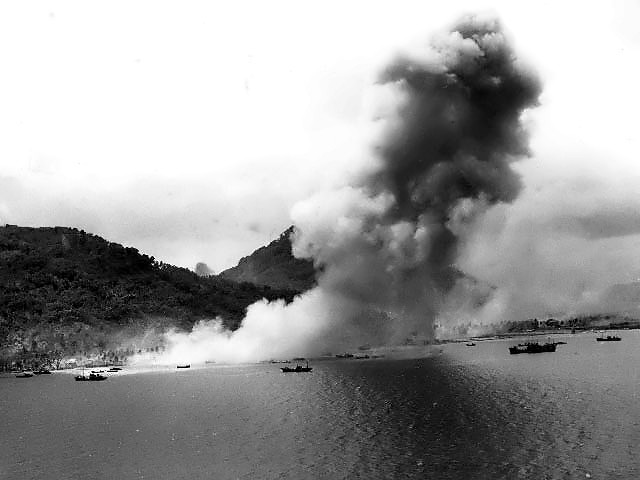
Attack on the Japanese naval base on Dublon Island, current state of Chuuk

=== United States rule ===
Chuuk was one of six districts of the Trust Territory of the Pacific Islands (TTPI) which were administered by the United States under charter from the United Nations from the end of the Second World War to the mid-1980s. The termination of U.S. administration of the Chuuk, Yap, Kosrae, Pohnpei, and Mariana Islands districts of the TTPI occurred on 3 November 1986.

=== Independence ===
The Federated States of Micronesia, including Chuuk, Yap, Kosrae, and Pohnpei, was established in 1979 and signed a Compact of Free Association with the U.S. (effective 3 November 1986).

As of recent times, Chuuk has been pushing harder for independence. An independence referendum was originally scheduled to coincide with federal elections on 3 March 2015, but was pushed back to 5 March 2019. The independence referendum was further pushed back to March 2022, with a date to be announced, while the constitutional legality of the proposed secession is determined.

== Geography ==
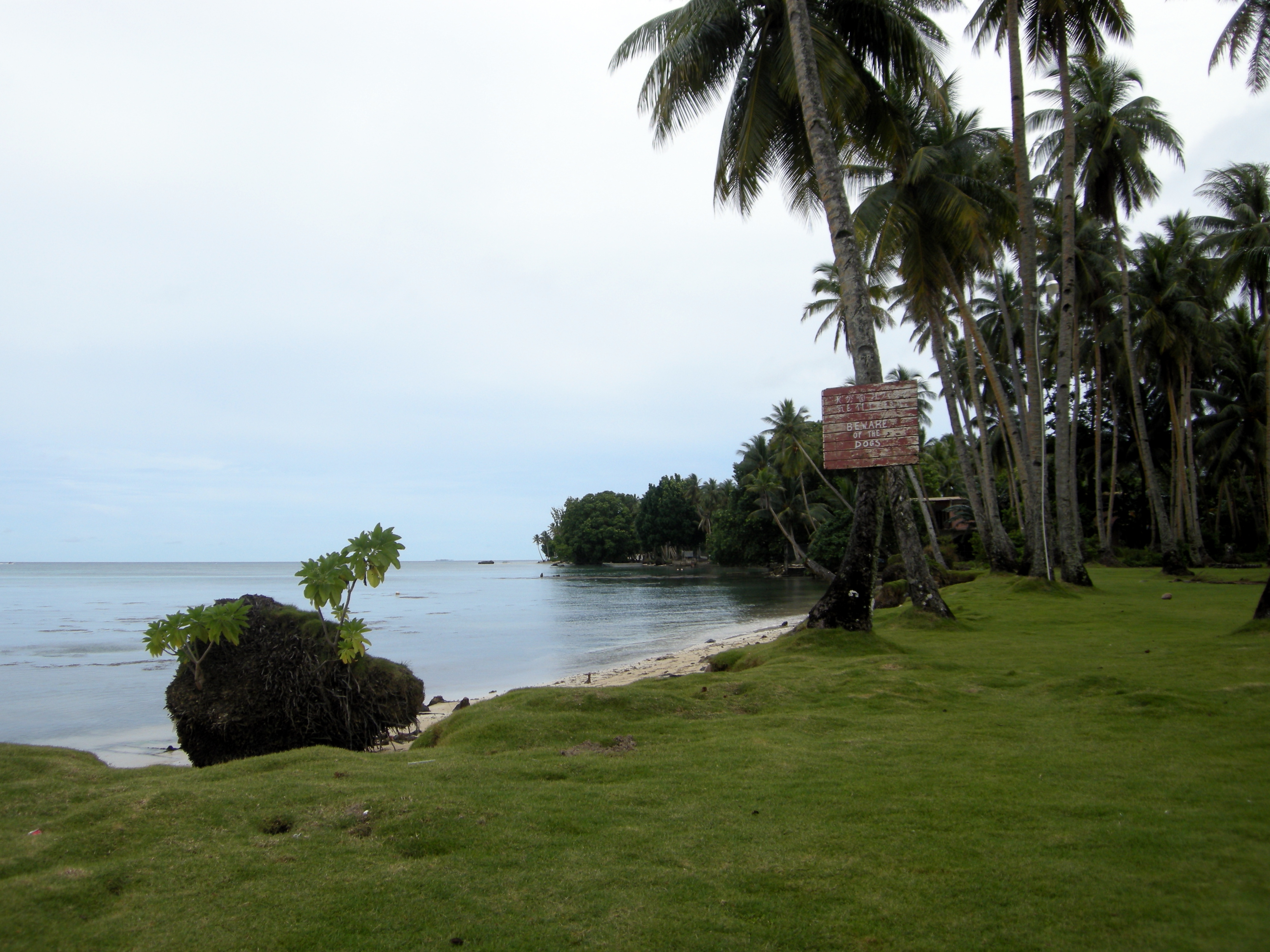
Weno island, Chuuk

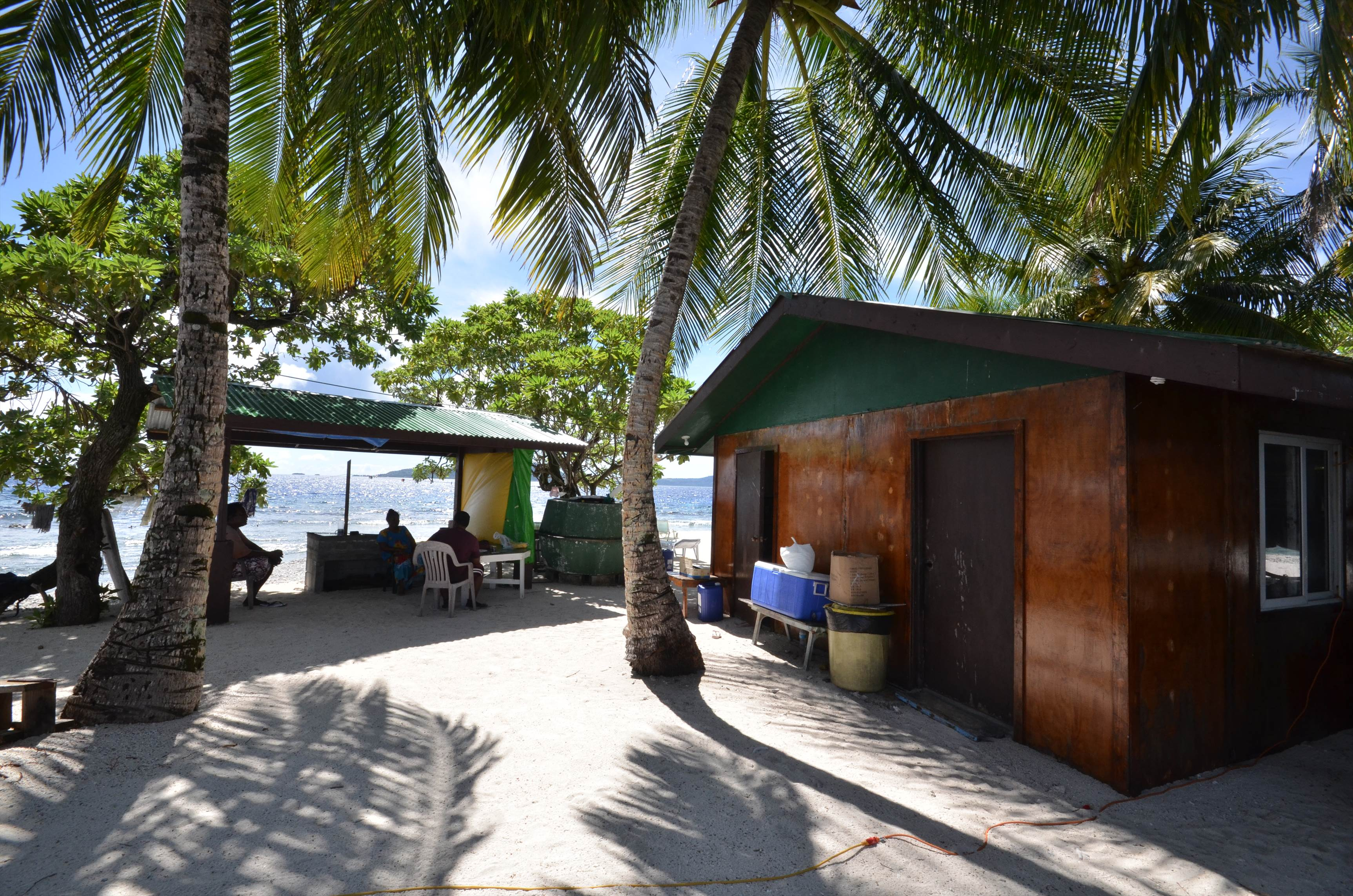
Jeep island, Chuuk State

To the west is Yap State. To the east are Pohnpei State and Kosrae State is further east.

The main population center of Chuuk State is the Chuuk Lagoon, a large archipelago with mountainous islands surrounded by a string of islets on a barrier reef. The two major geographical and dialectic divisions of the Chuuk Lagoon are Faichuuk, the western islands, and Namoneas, the eastern islands.

Chuuk State also includes several more sparsely populated "outer island" groups, including the Mortlock Islands to the southeast, the Hall Islands (Pafeng) to the north, Namonuito Atoll to the northwest, and the Pattiw Region to west. The Pattiw Region is of particular interest in that it has some of the most traditional islands in the Pacific and is culturally related to outer islands of Yap. This group includes the islands of Pollap, Tamatam, Poluwat, and Houk. There are still traditional master navigators—Poluwat and Pollap are considered to have some of the best navigators and ocean-going outrigger canoes in the Pacific. In the islands of the Pattiw Region, and some of the Islands of Yap, are the last two remaining schools of navigation, Weriyeng and Faaluush. Visiting the Pattiw Region in the west, however, is difficult due to the lack of reliable transportation. Houk probably has the most accessible airstrip in the Pattiw Region, with planes landing every one or two weeks.

The state shares its longitude with Sydney, Australia, namely the eastern portion of the city including the CBD.

=== Climate ===
Climate data for Weno, Chuuk
| Month | Jan | Feb | Mar | Apr | May | Jun | Jul | Aug | Sep | Oct | Nov | Dec | Year |
|---|---|---|---|---|---|---|---|---|---|---|---|---|---|
| Record high °C (°F) | 33 (91) | 32 (90) | 32 (90) | 33 (92) | 33 (91) | 33 (92) | 33 (92) | 33 (92) | 34 (93) | 33 (92) | 33 (91) | 33 (91) | 34 (93) |
| Mean daily maximum °C (°F) | 29.9 (85.8) | 29.9 (85.8) | 30.2 (86.4) | 30.4 (86.7) | 30.7 (87.3) | 30.7 (87.3) | 30.6 (87.1) | 30.7 (87.3) | 30.7 (87.3) | 30.7 (87.3) | 30.7 (87.3) | 30.2 (86.4) | 30.4 (86.7) |
| Daily mean °C (°F) | 27.4 (81.3) | 27.5 (81.5) | 27.6 (81.7) | 27.7 (81.9) | 27.8 (82.0) | 27.7 (81.9) | 27.4 (81.3) | 27.4 (81.3) | 27.5 (81.5) | 27.6 (81.7) | 27.7 (81.9) | 27.6 (81.7) | 27.6 (81.7) |
| Mean daily minimum °C (°F) | 24.9 (76.8) | 25.0 (77.0) | 25.1 (77.2) | 25.0 (77.0) | 24.9 (76.8) | 24.6 (76.3) | 24.2 (75.6) | 24.2 (75.6) | 24.2 (75.6) | 24.3 (75.7) | 24.6 (76.3) | 25.0 (77.0) | 24.7 (76.5) |
| Record low °C (°F) | 21 (69) | 21 (70) | 22 (71) | 22 (71) | 21 (70) | 21 (70) | 21 (70) | 21 (70) | 20 (68) | 19 (66) | 21 (70) | 21 (70) | 19 (66) |
| Average precipitation mm (inches) | 228 (8.98) | 163 (6.42) | 230 (9.05) | 291 (11.46) | 354 (13.94) | 301 (11.84) | 365 (14.37) | 350 (13.77) | 307 (12.07) | 361 (14.23) | 282 (11.10) | 293 (11.55) | 3,525 (138.78) |
| Average precipitation days (≥ 1.0 mm) | 14.8 | 12.2 | 14.9 | 16.2 | 21.2 | 20.3 | 20.8 | 21.0 | 18.6 | 20.0 | 20.0 | 18.8 | 218.8 |
| Average relative humidity (%) | 78.7 | 77.7 | 78.7 | 81.0 | 82.6 | 82.9 | 83.9 | 83.2 | 83.0 | 83.1 | 81.9 | 80.8 | 81.6 |
| Mean monthly sunshine hours | 195.3 | 197.8 | 217.0 | 195.0 | 192.2 | 180.0 | 195.3 | 195.3 | 177.0 | 161.2 | 162.0 | 167.4 | 2,235.5 |
Source 1: Hong Kong Observatory (sun 1961–1990)
Source 2: NOAA

=== Typhoon Chataan ===
On 2 July 2002, heavy rains from Tropical Storm Chataan caused more than thirty landslides that killed forty-seven people and injured dozens of others, in the state's deadliest weather disaster. The landslides occurred throughout the day, some within just minutes of each other.

== Demographics ==
Chuuk is the most populous of the FSM's states. At the census held on 1 April 2000, it had 53,595 inhabitants, compared with 34,486 for Pohnpei State, 11,241 for Yap State and 7,686 for Kosrae; at the census held on 4 April 2010, it had 48,654 inhabitants, compared with 36,196 for Pohnpei State, 11,377 for Yap State and 6,616 for Kosrae. In 2023, the population of Chuuk State, while still the largest of the four states, decreased by about 30% from the 2010 population to 33,885 inhabitants.

=== Religion ===
The majority of the state's population is affiliated with Christianity as a result of the activity of missionary groups first from Spain and then from Germany and the United States. Catholicism was introduced during the Spanish colonization period, followed by the arrival of various Protestant groups. The main religious building in the state is the Immaculate Heart of Mary Cathedral in Tunnuk, Weno, which is under the jurisdiction of the Diocese of the Caroline Islands (Diocese Carolinensium) suffragan of the ecclesiastical province of Agaña in Guam. Other churches in the state include Sacred Heart Church on Lekinioch Island, Christ the King Church in Neiwe, Houk Catholic Church, Holy Family Church in Weno, St. Ignatius Church in Fonoton, among others.

=== Language ===
The people of the country speak the Chuukese language, a Micronesian language.

== Culture ==
=== Jesuit mission at Weno ===
The USA East Province of the Society of Jesus (the Jesuits) maintains a mission school on the island of Weno in Chuuk. Xavier High School is housed at the former Japanese communications center. It is a coeducational institution, drawing students from all the island groups of the Federated States of Micronesia, as well as Palau and the Marshall Islands. Teachers are both Jesuit and lay and come from Micronesia, the U.S., Indonesia, Japan, and Australia.

=== Spirit possession ===
Although Chuuk is an overwhelmingly Christian society, traditional beliefs in spirit possession by the dead still exist. Allegedly, these spirits overwhelmingly possess women, and spirit possession is usually brought on by family conflicts. The spirits, speaking through the women, typically admonish family members to treat each other better.

=== Cultural references ===
There are some references on the Chuukese language, treating guests, and on beliefs in the sci-fi book "Reefsong" from Carol Severance.

== Municipalities ==
Of the 40 municipalities of the state, 16 fall within the Chuuk Lagoon and 24 in the Outer Islands.

In the table below, each is followed by its population at the 2010 Census:

- Chuuk Lagoon (36,158)
  - Faichuk (11,305)
    - Eot (266)
    - Fanapanges (672)
    - Paata (1,107)
    - Polle (1,498)
    - Romanum (865)
    - Tol (4,579)
    - Udot (1,680)
    - Wonei (638)
  - Northern Namoneas (14,620)
    - Fono (388)
    - Piis-Penau (376)
    - Weno (13,856)
  - Southern Namoneas (10,233)
    - Fefan (3,471)
    - Param (342)
    - Tonowas (3,517)
    - Tsis (349)
    - Uman (2,554)
- Outer Islands (12,496)
  - Mortlocks (5,677)
    - Etal (672)
    - Kutu (323)
    - Losap (248)
    - Lukunor (848)
    - Moch (932)
    - Nama (676)
    - Namoluk (355)
    - Oneop (400)
    - Pis-Losap (258)
    - Satawan (692)
    - Ta (273)
  - Northwest (6,819)
    - Fananu (580)
    - Houk (formerly known as Pulusuk) (1,116)
    - Magur (159)
    - Murilo (329)
    - Nomwin (763)
    - Onari (193)
    - Ono (172)
    - Pisaras (227)
    - Poluwat (745)
    - Pulap (1,168)
    - Ruo (241)
    - Tamatam (493)
    - Ulul (633)

== Politics and government ==
The State of Chuuk is one of the four federal states of the Federated States of Micronesia. As a democratic federation, each state has the ability to retain large number of power within the state as well as a certain level of sovereignty typical of federal states. The chief executive of Chuuk is the governor. Chuuk has a bicameral legislature.

== Education ==
Chuuk State Department of Education operates public schools.

Public high schools:

- Chuuk High School – Weno
- Faichuk High School
- Moch High School
- Mortlock High School
- Northwest High School (formerly known as 'Weipat' – Onoun Island)
- Southern Namoneas High School (SNHS)
- Weno High School

Private secondary schools:

- Berea Christian High School – Weno
- Saramen Chuuk Academy
- Xavier High School – Weno
- Mizpah Christian High School
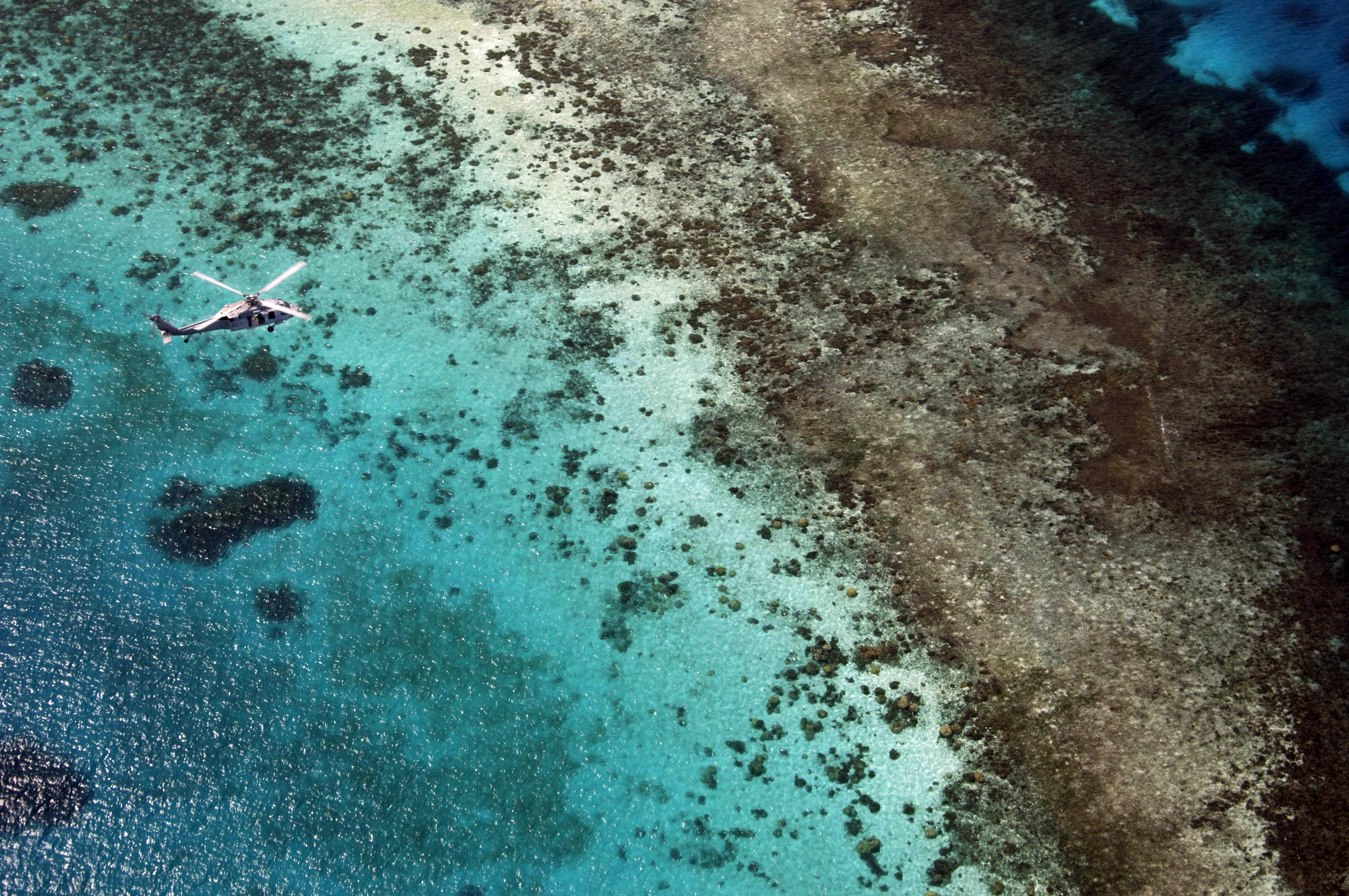
- Chuuk State Coast
  Seventh Day Adventist Mission School

Private primary schools:

- Pentecostal Light House Academy
- Saint Cecilia School
- Seventh Day Adventist Mission School

== Tourism ==
Chuuk State received the largest number of visitors of any of the Federated States of Micronesia. However, tourism is relatively under-developed. In the FSM's Development Plan for Chuuk, published in 2016, factors which disadvantaged the development of tourism in Chuuk included a lack of infrastructure, in particular irregular ferries between islands and a lack of regular electricity supplies on all islands apart from Weno. The report recognized that it is primarily Chuuk's underwater assets that would bring tourism, including its marine diversity and the Second World War shipwrecks around the coast. Where tourism does exist, it is reliant on the diving industry, which was established in the islands by Kimiuo Aisek. A legacy of his work to make Chuuk a dive destination was the establishment of the Kimiuo Aisek Memorial Museum.

Chuuk does not have the kind of distinctive architectural landmarks found on Yap, nor the archaeological sites present on Kosrae or Pohnpei. Colonial architecture has not been preserved.

The American attacks on the Japanese fleet in 1944 were such that today Truk lagoon is the largest underwater military cemetery in the world (60 ships and 400 aircraft scattered over several kilometers), which attracts divers from all over the world. The diving conditions are very good (visibility 15–40 meters, variations in depth, minor currents, 700 varieties of fish, generous coral). However, this source of income is jeopardized by preservation issues, from rapidly disintegrating carcasses to dynamite fishing that rapidly destroys whole sections of the graveyard.

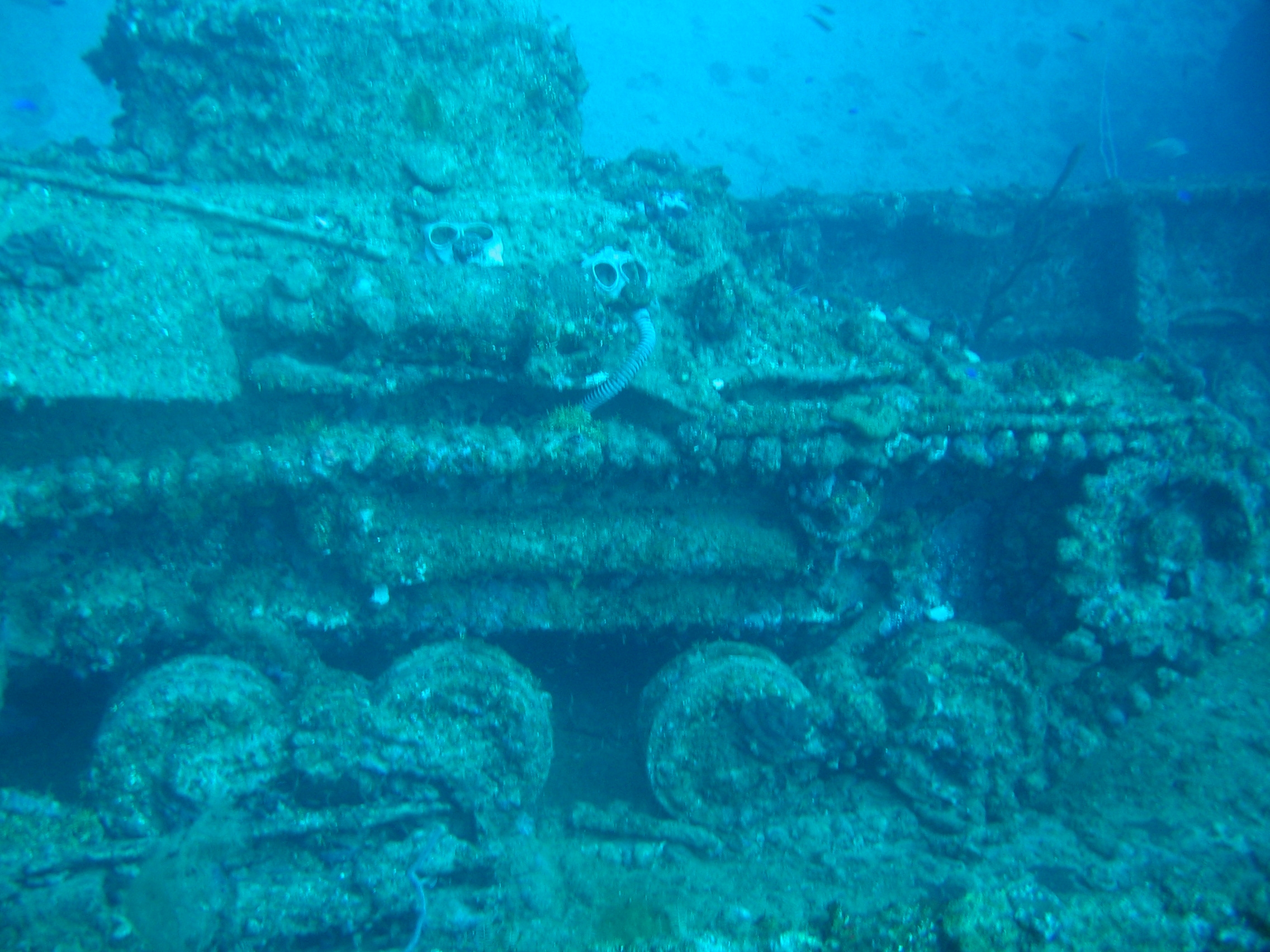
Japanese tank on the Nippo Maru. Sunk during World War II.

== See also ==
- Chuuk Women's Council, a non-governmental women's rights organization based in Weno.
- Habele, a South Carolina-based charity providing private economic educational assistance in Chuuk.
- Chuukese independence referendum, a vote for Chuuk to become independent from Micronesia, which was due to take place in 2022 and has been delayed three times. It has become embroiled in China-USA relations over its proximity to the US military base at Guam.
