= Fefan =

Island in Chuuk State, Federal States of Micronesia

Coordinates: 07°20.41′N 151°50.31′E

- Municipality
- Flag
- Interactive map of Fefan
- Country: Federated States of Micronesia
- State: Chuuk State

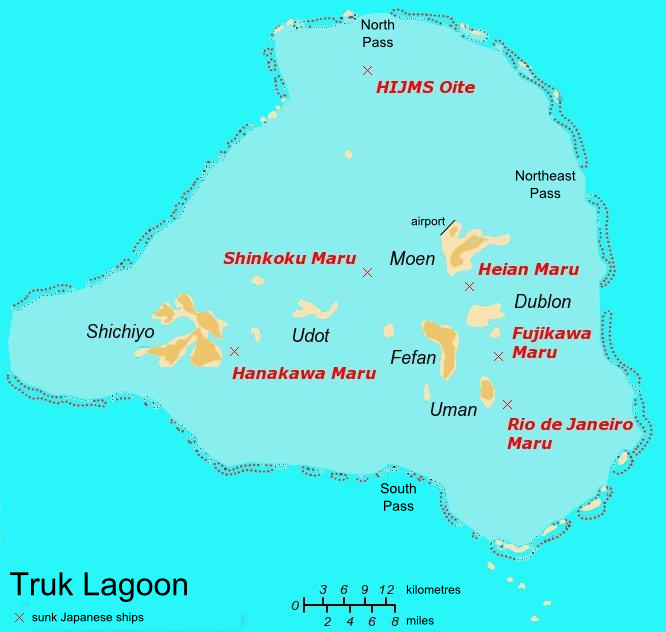
Map of the Truk Lagoon showing Fefan island

Fefan is the third largest inhabited island of the Chuuk Lagoon in the Federated States of Micronesia. It has an area of 13.2 km^{2} and a population of about 3,000 (last census: 1980) and is the second largest municipality in the Chuuk State. The northern part of the island is hilly and peaks at 298 meters above sea level.

== Education ==
Chuuk State Department of Education operates public schools.

Southern Namoneas High School is on Fefen Island.
