= Alonso de Arellano =

Spanish explorer

Alonso de Arellano was a 16th-century Spanish explorer who commanded one ship that was part of the fleet that re-discovered the Philippines after the Magellan and López de Villalobos expeditions.

== Biography ==
Arellano was captain of the San Lucas, piloted by Lope Martín, one of four ships in a fleet commanded by Miguel López de Legazpi. The fleet sailed from Mexico on 21 November 1564, but the San Lucas became separated from the rest on 1 December. Arellano continued onto the Philippines. He discovered a number of islands in January 1565, including Lib, Truk, Pulap, and Ngulu, before sailing back to Mexico, becoming the first navigator to establish the "Urdaneta's Route" in the Pacific Ocean. Andrés de Urdaneta was part of Legazpi's fleet, who had also separated from the group and discovered the same path afterwards. Urdaneta kept better documents and maps of the voyage and so the credit was given to him by historians.

Arellano was detained after his return on suspicion of desertion from Legazpi's fleet; however, an enquiry was inconclusive. He died in Mexico in 1579. Before his death, he wrote a narrative of his voyage; this was published in Spain in 1887.

== See also ==
- History of the Philippines
