= Shinobu M. Poll =

Chuukese nurse and women's rights activist

Shinobu Mailo Poll
- Born: 15 September 1938
- Died: February 2009 (aged 70)
- Monuments: Shinobu M. Poll Memorial Center
- Citizenship: Federated State of Micronesia
- Occupations: Nurse; community activist
- Employer: Chuuk State Hospital
- Organization: Chuuk Women's Council
- Children: Christina Stinnett

Shinobu Mailo Poll (15 September 1938 - February 2009) was a Chuukese nurse and women's rights activist, who was President of Chuuk Women's Council (CWC) in the Federated States of Micronesia from 1997 to 2009.

== Biography ==
Poll was born on 15 September 1938 and attended Moen Elementary School, followed by Truk District Intermediate School from 1950 to 1953. She then went on to study at the Pacific Islands Central School from 1953 to 1956, followed by the Trust Territory School of Nursing, which she graduated from in 1958. Working at Chuuk State Hospital, she travelled abroad to continue her training including courses at the University of Hawai'i in clinical nursing. From 1977 to 1979 Poll was involved with the Red Cross, acting as an advisor, as well as on disaster planning. In 1981 she participated in the World Health Organization's Epidemiological Surveillance training. She retired from nursing in 1996, having held the position of Chief Nurse.

In addition to her career in nursing, Poll was a community leader, who was involved in the foundation of several women's organisations, including the Trukese American Women's Association in 1960 and the Young Women's Association in Moen in 1963. She joined the Women's Christian Association of Moen in 1971 and became its president in 1975. Poll also a founding member of Chuuk Women's Council (CWC). She was President of the CWC from 1997 until her death in 2009. Under Poll's leadership the CWC expanded and raised its reputation in Chuuk State. She enabled a micro-grants programme to run, which gave women the opportunity to borrow money in order to begin small businesses. She also opened a handicraft shop, at the CWC's office and a market stall - this meant that women had a supportive location to sell their produce. As a former nurse, she recognised the importance of health education and ran programmes which focussed on diabetes and HIV/AIDs.

== Death and legacy ==
Poll died in February 2009 and her daughter Christina Stinnett became CWC President in 2010. In her will, Poll donated land to the CWC, on which was built a new headquarters for the CWC, named the Shinobu M. Poll Memorial Center. Located in Nepukos, on Weno, additional funding for the centre was donated by the government of Japan.
