= Tonnachau Mountain =

Mountain on Weno Island, Federated States of Micronesia

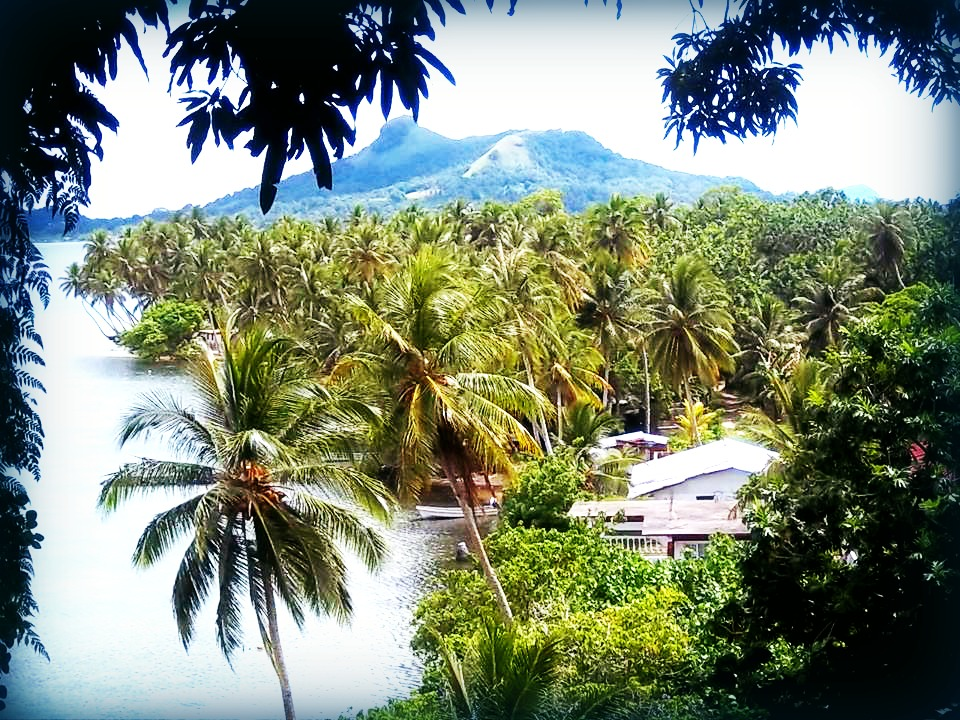
- View from Fono Island

Highest point
- Elevation: 1,100 ft (340 m)
- Coordinates: 7°27′35″N 151°50′59″E

Geography
- Location: Moen, Chuuk State, Federated States of Micronesia

Geology
- Mountain type: Volcanic

- Tonnachau Mountain
- U.S. National Register of Historic Places
- Location: Iras, Moen Island (Truk), Fed. States
- Area: 0 acres (0 ha)
- NRHP reference No.: 76002210
- Added to NRHP: September 30, 1976

Tonnachau Mountain (also variously spelled Tonachau and Tonaachaw) is a mountain on Weno Island in Chuuk State of the Federated States of Micronesia. Rising to a height of 1,100 feet (340 m), it is not the highest peak of Weno, which is Mount Teroken to the south. Tonnachau is, however, a prominent landmark rising above Chuuk International Airport.

The mountain has an important place in Chuukese culture and prehistory, with archaeologically significant prehistoric middens and fortifications on its summit ridge which date back as far as 4,000 BCE. Chuukese tradition states that its hero Soukachou built a fort on Tonachau when he arrived from Kosrae and established rule over the lagoon. The mountain also has extensive remains of mainly Japanese fortifications erected during World War II.

The mountain was listed on the United States National Register of Historic Places on September 30, 1976, a time when Chuuk was part of the US-administered Trust Territory of the Pacific Islands.
