= Japanese settlement in Micronesia =

Large-scale Japanese settlement in Micronesia occurred in the first half of the 20th century when Imperial Japan colonised much of Micronesia.

Between 1914 and 1945, the modern-day Micronesian territories of the Northern Mariana Islands, the Federated States of Micronesia, Palau and the Marshall Islands were part of the Japanese-governed, League of Nations-created South Seas Mandate, known in Japan as Nan'yō. During the Second World War, the Japanese settlers outnumbered the Micronesians within the mandate territory and extensively intermarried with Micronesians, raising families locally. A few Japanese also resided in Kiribati and Nauru, where they worked as contract labourers or established businesses.

After 1945, most of the Japanese settlers were repatriated to Japan, but the offspring of Japanese settlers and Micronesians were allowed to remain. These offspring usually identify themselves as Micronesians rather than Japanese, and constitute a sizeable minority in each of the territories' populace.

Archeological excavations have revealed that Micronesians lived on the island of Chichijima (one of the Japanese Bonin Islands) in the past.

== Main articles ==
- Federated States of Micronesia: Japanese settlement in the Federated States of Micronesia
- Kiribati: Japanese settlement in Kiribati
- Marshall Islands: Japanese settlement in the Marshall Islands
- Palau: Japanese settlement in Palau

== See also ==
- Koreans in Micronesia

== Bibliography ==
- Crocombe, R. G., Asia in the Pacific Islands: Replacing the West, 2007, ISBN 982-02-0388-0
- Kiste, Robert C.; Marshall, Mac, American Anthropology in Micronesia: An Assessment, University of Hawaii Press, 1999, ISBN 0-8248-2017-7
- McQuarrie, Peter, Conflict in Kiribati: A History of the Second World War, Macmillan Brown Centre for Pacific Studies, University of Canterbury, 2000, ISBN 1-877175-21-8
- Poyer, Lin; Falgout, Suzanne; Carucci, Laurence Marshall, The Typhoon of War: Micronesian Experiences of the Pacific War, University of Hawaii Press, 2001, ISBN 0-8248-2168-8
