= Mount Teroken =

Mountain in the Federated States of Micronesia

Coordinates: 7°26′N 151°51′E

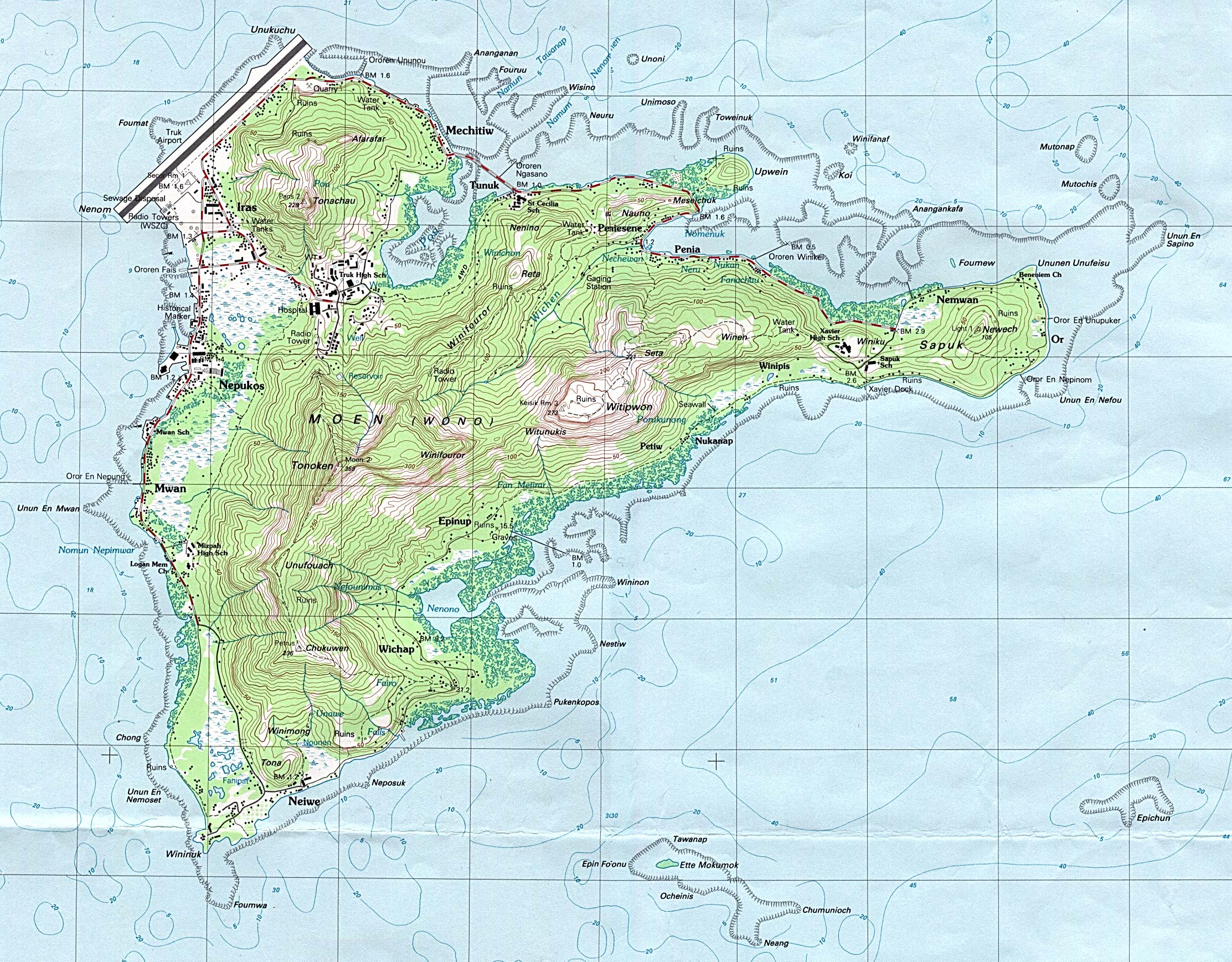
Weno Island, Chuuk, Micronesia, Pacific Ocean

Mount Teroken is the highest point on the Micronesian island of Weno in Chuuk State. It rises to a height of 1214 ft (364 m).
