= Wiichen Men's Meetinghouse =

- U.S. National Register of Historic Places
- Location within Federated States of Micronesia
- Location: Peniesene, Weno Island (Truk), Federated States of Micronesia
- Coordinates: 7°27′5″N 151°52′20″E
- Area: 1 acre (0.40 ha)
- NRHP reference No.: 76002213
- Added to NRHP: September 30, 1976

The Wiichen Men's Meetinghouse is a historic building site in Peniesene on Weno Island in Chuuk State of the Federated States of Micronesia. The site, deemed archaeologically significant due to its place in Chuukese folklore, includes a pre-contact period petroglyph panel and swimming basin. Local history claims that this was the meeting place of six brothers who became the first chieftains of Chuuk.

The site was added to the United States National Register of Historic Places in 1976, when the region was part of the US-administered Trust Territory of the Pacific Islands.
