= Chuuk Women's Council =

Micronesian women's rights federation

- Formation: 1984
- Founder: Shinobu M. Poll
- Headquarters: Nepukos, Weno
- President: Christina Stinnett
- Website: http://www.cwcfiinchuuk.org/

Chuuk Women's Council is a women's rights organization in Chuuk State in the Federated States of Micronesia (FSM). Founded in 1984, it represents over sixty women's groups spread across the state, and actively campaigns for greater gender equality, as well as running programs that focus on health, education and environmental issues

== History ==
Chuuk Women's Advisory Council was established in 1984, with the aim to educate and empower women in Chuuk State. In 1993 it formally registered as a non-governmental organization and changed its name to Chuuk Women's Council (CWC). A founding member was Shinobu M. Poll, who was a nurse at Chuuk State Hospital, and President of the CWC from 1997 to her death. Her daughter Christina Stinnett became CWC President in 2010.

In addition to her leadership role, Poll donated land to the CWC, on which was built a new headquarters for the CWC, named the Shinobu M. Poll Memorial Center. Located in Nepukos, on Weno, additional funding for the center was donated by the government of Japan.

The CWC functions as an umbrella organization for over sixty groups in Chuuk State and has over 1,000 women members. Members are spread across all the inhabited islands of the state. The CWC runs a monthly meeting where representatives from women's groups across Chuuk come to the center to participate in workshops and attend training to take back to their communities.

== Campaigns ==
The CWC ran a successful campaign for the age of consent in the Federated States of Micronesia to be raised from thirteen to eighteen years of age. They also campaign against sex trafficking. In March 2020 the CWC launched the Tongen Inepwineu Counselling Center, which is the first crisis support center for women in the FSM. It provides free counselling and support to survivors of domestic violence, rape, sexual harassment and child sexual abuse. In order to launch the service, a decade-long program of renovation was carried out on the Shinobu M. Poll Memorial Center in order for it become an appropriate facility for crisis support. Due to the COVID-19 pandemic the CWC's activities switched from group-based services to one-to-one outreach. A particular concern was access to sexual health resources, including information, as well as HIV prevention packages.

In November 2020 it carried out its first 16 Days of Activism Against Gender-Based Violence campaign, which aimed to raise awareness about gender-based violence and how to stop it. The campaign was delivered by the CWC's Tongen Inepwineu Counselling Center (TICC) counselling service. The events included an event centered around public health education, which was attended by the First Lady of Chuuk State, Bersita Elimo.

The CWC has also campaigned for greater involvement of women's organizations in discussion about climate crisis. They have also undertaken research into community awareness of water conservation. They have also run environmental initiatives based on waste management, home gardening, and mangrove planting. Under Poll's leadership the CWC also ran a micro-grants program. A major aspect of the work of the CWC is health education - with extremely high rates of diabetes and obesity, a major thread of their activity focuses on healthy living and cooking. they also run physical activity programs for women and children. In 2013 they established a computer lab, that women could use free of charge.

== Notable people ==
- Shinobu M. Poll - co-founder.
- Christina Stinnett - President (2010 -2021)
- Shinobu Courtney Stinnett - Acting President (2021-2023)
- Gracelyn Mary Poll Serious - President (2023 onwards)
