= Mori Koben =

Japanese businessman (1869–1945)

- 森 小弁
- Born: October 15, 1869; Tosa Province, Japan
- Died: August 23, 1946 (aged 76)
- Known for: early Japanese pioneers in Micronesia, businessman

Mori Koben (森 小弁; October 15, 1869 – August 23, 1945) was a Japanese businessman and adventurer, who was best remembered as one of the first Japanese pioneers in Micronesia. As a young man, Mori migrated from Japan to Chuuk, where he helped to establish Japanese businesses in Micronesia. Mori's guidance and direction helped to expand Japanese business interests throughout Micronesia during the Spanish and German colonial-era. After Japan annexed Micronesia from Germany in 1914, Mori was hired as an adviser to the Japanese administration in the South Seas Mandate, and was instrumental in encouraging Japanese settlement in Micronesia. In his final years during World War II, Mori facilitated Micronesian support in the Japanese war efforts, but was already suffering from failing health from old age. He died within a few days after the Japanese surrender, and a sizeable minority of Micronesians with Japanese ancestry from Chuuk trace their ancestry back to Mori.

== Early life ==
Mori was born in Tosa Province (part of modern-day Kōchi Prefecture), Shikoku to a Samurai family. In his youth, Mori developed an aptitude for the study of Mathematics, Physics and Chinese classics. At the age of fifteen in 1884, Mori left his hometown to work as a houseboy for Oi Kentarō. At that time, Oi was plotting to raise an army to prepare for an invasion of Korea. Mori was inspired by Oi's, and often followed along Oi and his activist followers to carry out robbery and extortion to raise funds for the purchase of weapons. The police carried out a crackdown on Oi's followers the following year, and about 130 activists were arrested in Osaka and Nagasaki. Mori was among those who was arrested, but was released on account of his young age. Shortly after he was released, Mori managed to secure employment to work as a houseboy in the Court where Kentarō was being tried. Mori attempted to steal evidence that was used against Oi in the prosecution, but was caught red-handed and convicted to prison for a year. After his release, Mori returned to his hometown, and later moved to Tokyo in 1889. Through a former acquaintance of Oi, Mori worked as a houseboy for Gotō Shōjirō's household the following year. During his stint with Gotō's family, Mori came across artefacts and research which Gotō's son, Taketarō had gathered during his diplomatic to Micronesia. Mori left Gotō's household in May 1891 to work for the Ichiya company, a trading firm which had business interests in Micronesia.

== Adult life ==
=== Early years in Micronesia ===
Mori was selected to work as a resident representative of the company's branch in Micronesia, and left Japan from Yokohama, on board the Tenyu Maru in November 1891 with eight other employees. The Tenyu Maru stopped by the Bonins, but encountered a typhoon when it came close to the Marianas. Mori and his colleagues reached Pohnpei in 1891, where one of his colleagues got his wife pregnant and had a set of triplets disembarked to manage the company's branch store. The Tenyu Maru headed for Truk Lagoon, and Mori left the ship's company and armed himself with a sword and two daggers. Mori offered his services as a military adviser for Manuppis, the most influential chief in Moen. After leading a successful attack against a rival tribe, Manuppis facilitated Mori's efforts to assimilate with Chuukese society. He maintained contacts with the Ichiya company, and equipped Manuppis with Japanese Murata rifles. A few Japanese settlers came to Chuuk over the next few years, and Mori maintained close contacts with Japanese traders in Chuuk and Pohnpei. As tribal warfare continued into the 1890s, Mori and the other Japanese settlers continued to align themselves with the tribal chiefs in order to safeguard their business interests.

Mori lost the fingers on his right hand in 1896, while he was preparing gunpowder for ammunition which suddenly exploded. Mori tended to his own wounds in spite of the great pain, and remained in Chuuk for several weeks before leaving for Yokohama by a merchant ship. He sought medical treatment in Tokyo, before he returned to Tolas where he spent several months recuperating. The following year, Mori returned to Chuuk, and built a house at Moen. Mori was appointed the resident agent for Hiki Company, after the Ichiya company faced bankruptcy. In 1898, Mori married Manuppis's daughter, and their first son Taro was born in the same year. He became an independent trader in 1899, after the Hiki company ran into financial difficulties, and aligned himself with the Jaluit Gesellschaft, a German trading company at the turn of the century.

Two years after Germany purchased the Micronesian islands from Spain in 1898, the German authorities arrested the Japanese traders at Irais and deported them back to Japan, leaving only Mori in Chuuk and another Japanese trader stranded in Pohnpei. Japanese traders were barred from trading in Micronesia. Mori and his family relocated to Tol, and received occasional contacts of news reports from Japan. Japanese traders began settling in Micronesia after the Germans lifted the ban in 1907, but Mori kept a low profile to avoid antagonising the German administration.

=== Japanese colonial era (1914–1945) ===
Shortly after Japan seized the Micronesian islands from Germany, Mori was hired as a civil affairs adviser by the Japanese military administration. At the direction of the Japanese navy commander, Mori authored a thesis on the culture and customs of the Chuukese people, and was later used by the military administration in drafting local administrative policies. When the military occupation gave way to the South Seas Mandate, Mori stayed on. He was ranked among the wealthiest men in the Carolines in the 1920s, having built his wealth from revenues that he received from coconut and copra plantations that he had established. He lobbied the Japanese government to facilitate the construction of trade facilities, transportation and schools in Chuuk. He was also elected as the chief of Tol within the Chuukese community, and was the first known foreigner to be elected to a political position in traditional Micronesian society. A comic book written by Shimada Keizo in the 1930s, Boken Dankichi which drew its inspiration from Mori's experiences in his youth, led the general public to acquaint itself with Mori, both in Japan and Micronesia. Government officials and businessmen based in Chuuk often paid their respects to Mori in his house before they went about carrying out their duties, and the Japanese press often referred to Mori as the "King of the South Seas" in news reports. During the opening ceremony for a new athletic field at Dublon, Mori was awarded the 8th class of the Order of the Sacred Treasure.

In the Second World War, Mori provided assistance to the Japanese government for the country's war effort. At the persuasion of Mori's family, many Chuukese offered their services to the Japanese government. A few of his grandsons also served in the army, and Mori's sons and grandsons were instrumental in protecting the islanders' food resources from petty theft during the war. Mori himself suffered a stroke in 1942, and was left paralysed in the right side of his body. He gradually developed increasing signs of dementia which left him hallucinating of Japan's defeat in the Pacific War. Mori slipped into unconsciousness shortly before the Japanese surrender in early August 1945, and died at his home in Tol seven days after the surrender.

== Family ==
Mori had six sons and five daughters with Manuppis's daughter. His wife was given the Japanese name of "Isa" at the time of their marriage in 1898. Mori gave his children Japanese names, and in his younger days he taught his children Japanese and often celebrated Japanese national holidays at home. When Japan ruled Micronesia between 1914 and 1945, Mori's family were granted Japanese citizenship and were identified by their Japanese heritage. After the Japanese surrender, members of the Mori family renounced their Japanese citizenship, and identified themselves as Micronesians. A 1984 survey counted that there were at least 1,000 male-line descendants of Mori, mostly from the 3rd to the 6th generations. Descendants from the female-line make up approximately another 1,000.

== Bibliography ==
- Crocombe, R. G., Asia in the Pacific Islands: Replacing the West, 2007, ISBN 982-02-0388-0
- Gaimusho, 20世紀: Sensō hen : Nihon no sensō–Volume 3 of 20世紀: どんな時代だったのか, 読売新聞社, 2000
- Hezel, Francis X., Strangers in Their Own Land: A Century of Colonial Rule in the Caroline and Marshall Islands (Issue 13 of Pacific Islands Monograph Ser. 13), University of Hawaii Press, 2003, ISBN 0-8248-2804-6
- Kiste, Robert C.; Marshall, Mac, American Anthropology in Micronesia: An Assessment, University of Hawaii Press, 1999. ISBN 0-8248-2017-7
- Peattie, Mark R., Nanʻyō: The rise and fall of the Japanese in Micronesia, 1885–1945, University of Hawaii Press, 1988, ISBN 0-8248-1480-0
- Poyer, Lin; Falgout, Suzanne; Carucci, Laurence Marshall, The Typhoon of War: Micronesian Experiences of the Pacific War, University of Hawaii Press, 2001, ISBN 0-8248-2168-8
