= Kimiuo Aisek Memorial Museum =

Museum in Chuuk State, Federated States of Micronesia

- Kimiuo Aisek Memorial Museum
- Named after: Kimiuo Aisek
- Formation: September 13, 2014; 11 years ago
- Type: Non-governmental
- Purpose: Underwater heritage
- Coordinates: 07°24′47″N 151°50′39″E
- Website: www.truk-lagoon-dive.com

Kimiuo Aisek Memorial Museum is a museum in Chuuk State, in the Federated States of Micronesia. It is the first museum to be established on the island.

== Background ==
The museum opened on 13 September 2014 and is located next to the Blue Lagoon Dive Shop in Neauno village, Weno. It is named after Kimiuo Aisek, a diving entrepreneur, who opened the first dive shop in Chuuk.

== Collections and research ==
The museum's collection focuses on artifacts relating to the Second World War, many of which have been recovered by divers exploring wreck sites. Chuuk Lagoon was the Empire of Japan's main base in the South Pacific. On 17 February 1944, US Forces launched Operation Hailstone which destroyed Japanese merchant ships, light naval cruisers and 265 aircraft. The legacy of the attack made the "lagoon the biggest graveyard of ships in the world". It was witnessed by Kimiuo Aisek when he was young.

The museum displays the bell recovered from the ship Sapporo Maru. Shell casings and propellers are on open display outside the museum. Other objects on display include ceramics, gas masks and water bottles, each displayed with the wreck they have been collected from.

Closely associated with the 'underwater museum' of the fifty-three shipwrecks which surround Chuuk, the museum is a significant location for the underwater cultural heritage of the Federated States of Micronesia. The museum has partnered on several publications exploring the history of Second World in Chuuk, as well as diving history there.

In addition to its focus on Second World War history, the museum also has a display of Chuukese ethnographic material.
