= Tonotan Guns and Caves =

- U.S. National Register of Historic Places
- Location within Federated States of Micronesia
- Location: Nantaku, Weno, Chuuk State, Federated States of Micronesia
- Coordinates: 7°26′31″N 151°50′53″E
- Area: 2 acres (0.81 ha)
- NRHP reference No.: 76002211
- Added to NRHP: September 30, 1976

The Tonotan Guns and Caves are a series of World War II-era military fortification on the island of Weno, the main island of Chuuk State in the Federated States of Micronesia. They consist of an excavation housing an English naval gun, and a series of caves used for housing and operations that provided shelter from aerial bombardment. The installations are located on the lower north flank of Mount Teroken, the island's highest peak.

The installations were listed on the United States National Register of Historic Places in 1976, when Chuuk was part of the US-administered Trust Territory of the Pacific Islands.
