= Japanese settlement in Kiribati =

- (Japan) (Kiribati)
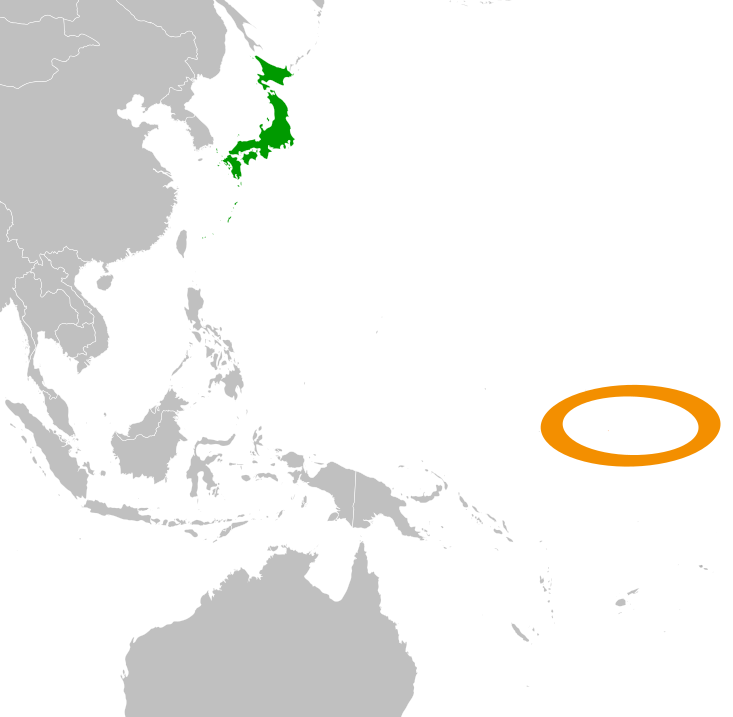

Total population
- 17 (2007) (Note: Figure only includes Japanese nationals in Kiribati.)

Regions with significant populations
- Butaritari, Betio, Tarawa

Languages
- Gilbertese, minority of Japanese and English

Religion
- Mostly Roman Catholicism

Related ethnic groups
- Japanese, I-Kiribati

Japanese presence in Kiribati dates back to the end of 19th and the beginning of the 20th century, when labourers were hired to work in Kiribati's phosphate mines. The migration of some workers and labourers from Okinawa was seen as early as 1860 and the Meiji era. As compared to the other Micronesian countries which came under Japanese rule in the first half of the 20th century, the majority of the Japanese consisted of transient workers and only a few settled in Kiribati. Since Kiribati became independent in 1978, a few Japanese have also taken permanent residence in Kiribati, and assumed important positions within Gilbertese society.

== History ==
The first Japanese to install in the Gilbert Islands was Nito Atō (1856-1923). He was from Okinawa and worked for William Mackenzie, a Scottish trader in Arorae. He married the daughter of the trader, Melissa Nito. The first Japanese were brought to Ocean Island to work as mechanics at the direction of the Pacific Phosphate Company in 1905. Japanese labourers were also brought from the early 1910s onwards as the company faced work problems from Gilbertese and Chinese workers. Japanese traders from the South Seas Trading Company (Nanyo Boeki Kaisha) also began to visit the Gilbert Islands at the start of World War I. The British colonial administration permitted the trading company to establish a branch store at Butaritari in 1915, but were prohibited to engage in trade in the other parts of the Gilbert or Ellice Islands. Japanese businessmen took over the management of the copra trade in the Gilbert Islands after another copra trading company, On Chong faced financial problems. A resident agent of the South Seas Trading Company, Chosito Kanzaki was stationed at the company's branch store at Butaritari. Within a few years after Kanzaki settled down, he married two Gilbertese women, Lina Muller in 1919 and Maria Mitchell several years later. Between both wives Kanzaki had several children, and he often commuted between Kiribati and Jaluit in the Marshall Islands.

A few Japanese resided with Kanzaki over a temporary basis with Kanzaki during the Interwar years. When the Japanese invaded Kiribati in December 1941, Kanzaki and his assistant, Suzuki were the only Japanese nationals residing in Kiribati. Kanzaki was hired as an interpreter and liaison officer for the Japanese army, and mobilised Gilbertese men to work as labourers to support Japanese war efforts. The Japanese military administration also brought in Okinawan labourers who were conscripted to build naval facilities around the islands. Some 5,000 Japanese were stationed on Tarawa and Makin, and consisted mainly of army and navy personnel, as well as a few settlers. There was minimal promiscuous contact between the Japanese soldiers and Gilbertese women, as Kanzaki and Gilbertese men helped to facilitate strict regulations to minimise contact between Gilbertese women and Japanese soldiers. After the Japanese Surrender, Japanese nationals living in the islands were quickly repatriated.

Japanese fishermen started fishing for tuna in Kiribati from the late 1970s, and reportedly engage in occasional promiscuous liaisons with local Gilbertese prostitutes in Betio. A few Japanese nationals also settled down in Kiribati and acquired Gilbertese citizenship from the 1980s. Many of these settlers assumed leading positions in Gilbertese society and married Gilbertese wives, notably Kentaro Ono, who served as the President of Kiribati's Chamber of Commerce.

== Bibliography ==
- Crocombe, R. G., Asia in the Pacific Islands: Replacing the West, 2007, ISBN 982-02-0388-0
- Crocombe, R. G., The South Pacific, University of the South Pacific, 2001, ISBN 982-02-0154-3
- MacDonald, Brian, Cinderellas of the Empire: Towards a History of Kiribati and Tuvalu, 2002, ISBN 982-02-0335-X
- McQuarrie, Peter, Conflict in Kiribati: A History of the Second World War, Macmillan Brown Centre for Pacific Studies, University of Canterbury, 2000, ISBN 1-877175-21-8
- United Nations ESCAP, Pacific Perspectives on the Commercial Sexual Exploitation and Sexual Abuse of Children and Youth, United Nations publications, 2009, ISBN 978-92-1-120552-7
