= Christina Stinnett =

Micronesian women's rights activist

Christina Stinnett (known as "Kiki") is a Micronesian women's rights activist and businesswoman, who was the President of Chuuk Women's Council (CWC), which overlooks more than 60 women's organisations within Chuuk State in the Federated States of Micronesia.

== Career ==
Stinnett established the first travel agency, Truk Travel Unlimited, in the state in March 1984 and owns the Truk Stop Hotel, along with the restaurant at Truk Lagoon Dive Center. The Chuuk Women's Council (CWC) was established in the late 1980s and attempts to educate and empower women on various women topics such as leadership, education and health, and preservation of culture. Stinnett is President of the CWC. She also sits on the board of the Chuuk Conservation Society, Chuuk State Board of Education, and FSM Women in Business Network, of which she is the Vice President of their alliance of NGOs. In October 2014, Stinnett was one of around 300 people invited to attend the 3rd FSM Women's Conference in Kolonia, Pohnpei.

In 2011, Stinnett was named of the US State Department's 100 Women in their 100 Years/100 Women Campaign to commemorate the 100th Anniversary of International Women's Day. She has also been named one of Pacific Community's "70 Inspiring Pacific Women".
