= COVID-19 pandemic in the Federated States of Micronesia =

- Disease: COVID-19
- Pathogen: SARS-CoV-2
- Location: Federated States of Micronesia
- First outbreak: Wuhan, China
- Index case: Pohnpei
- Arrival date: 8 January 2021
- Confirmed cases: 31,765
- Deaths: 65
- Fatality rate: 0.2%

Government website
- FSM Department of Health & Social Affairs

The COVID-19 pandemic in the Federated States of Micronesia was part of the worldwide pandemic of coronavirus disease 2019 (COVID-19) caused by severe acute respiratory syndrome coronavirus 2 (SARS-CoV-2). The virus was confirmed to have reached the Federated States of Micronesia on 8 January 2021, but an outbreak didn't begin until mid July 2022.

== Background ==
On 12 January 2020, the World Health Organization (WHO) confirmed that a novel coronavirus was the cause of a respiratory illness in a cluster of people in Wuhan City, Hubei Province, China, which was reported to the WHO on 31 December 2019.

The case fatality ratio for COVID-19 has been much lower than SARS of 2003, but the transmission has been significantly greater, with a significant total death toll.

== Timeline ==
Cases

Deaths

=== 2020 ===
By 3 February 2020, President David W. Panuelo, had signed a declaration banning Micronesian citizens from travelling to China and other affected countries.

By 5 March, Micronesia had introduced a strict travel ban, banning anyone who had been in China anytime since January 2020 – or had been in any other affected country in the last 14 days – from entering Micronesia. By 18 March, all schools in the country were closed.

=== 2021 ===
A speech by President David Panuelo after the first case on the MV Chief Mailo

On 8 January 2021, Micronesia reported its first case, that of a crew member on board the MV Chief Mailo near Pohnpei, in managed isolation.

By the end of the month, the case was deemed to be negative and historical after subsequent antibody and antigen tests. The case was deemed a non-infectious "historical case", meaning the individual concerned likely had COVID-19 in the past possibly prior to October 2020 and was asymptomatic at the time of testing.

In August 2021, the government imposed a strict vaccination mandate for all its citizens; which meant federal aid could be with held from anyone not vaccinated. This ensured high vaccination rates, where nearly 60% of the population was fully vaccinated and about 70% was partially vaccinated by September 2021.

=== 2022 ===
The government had planned to end all of its quarantine restrictions and also open its borders on 1 August 2022, but a COVID-19 outbreak began in the country in mid July 2022. On 19 July, the government announced that multiple positive cases were recorded in the states of Kosrae and Pohnpei. The number of cases skyrocketed by a 1,000 by the end of the week and there were a total of 1,261 cases and one death by 26 July. The Vice President Yosiwo George also tested positive and had to be hospitalized. The government issued a mask mandate, noncompliance of which meant a $1,000 fine.

Cases and deaths continued to rise throughout the remainder of the year, and by 15 December, a total of 22,048 cases and 58 deaths had been reported.

== Statistics ==
Cases by states (as of 11 October 2022)
State	Confirmed cases	Historical cases	Deaths	References
Chuuk	11,772	0	22	
Kosrae	1,113	1	3	
Pohnpei	5,817	3	23	
Yap	3,068	0	5	
4/4	21,770	4	53	

== Impact ==
Due to the COVID-19 pandemic the Chuuk Women's Council switched from group-based services to one-to-one outreach. A particular concern was access to sexual health resources, including information, as well as HIV prevention packages.

== See also ==
- COVID-19 pandemic in Oceania
