= Weno =

Island in the Federated States of Micronesia

Native name: Wééné
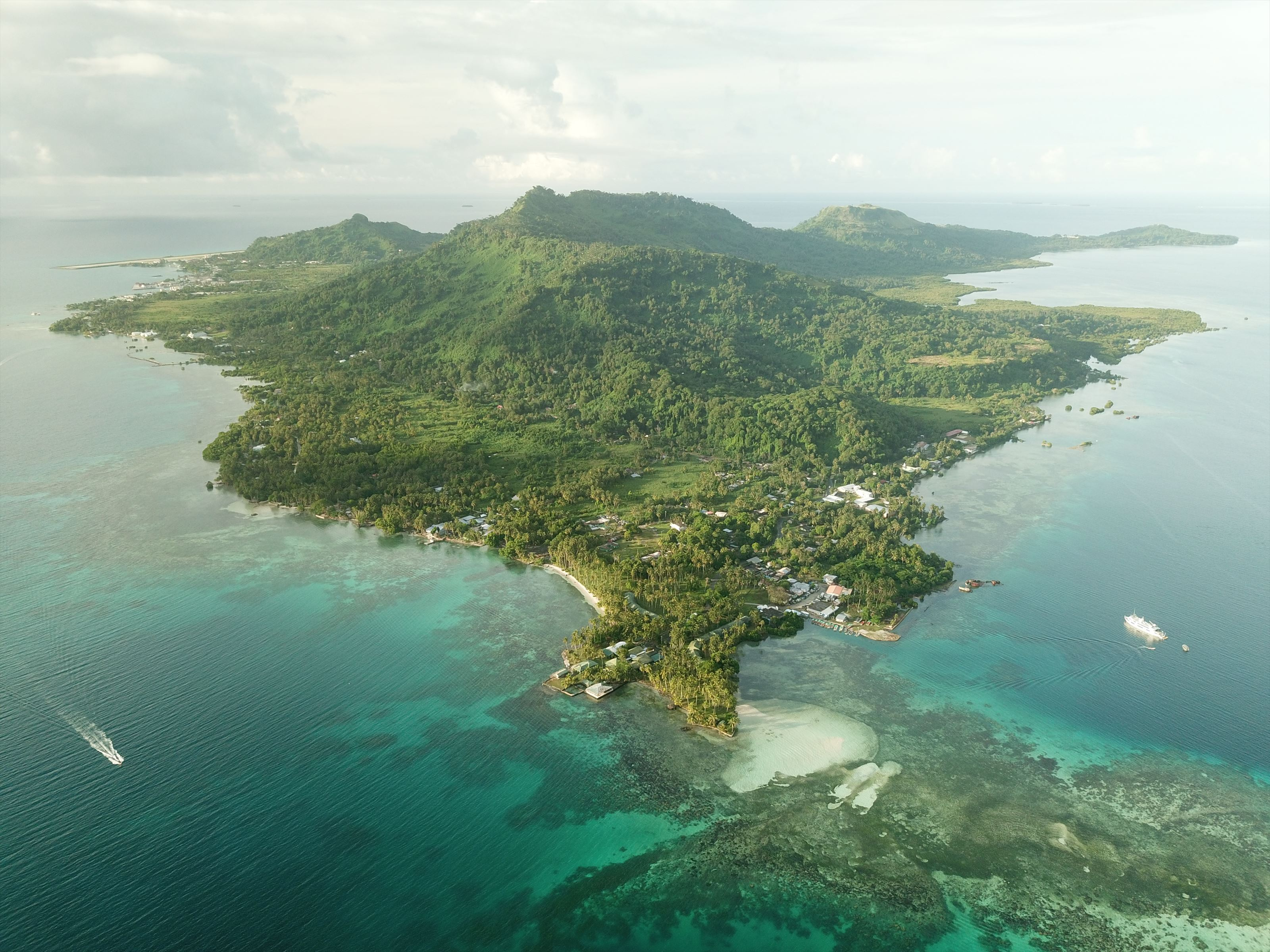
- Aerial view of Weno facing northeastward
- Interactive map of Weno

Geography
- Location: Pacific Ocean
- Coordinates: 7°26′24″N 151°52′8″E
- Type: Volcanic
- Archipelago: Chuuk Islands
- Area: 18.91 km^{2} (7.30 sq mi)
- Highest elevation: 369 m (1211 ft)
- Highest point: Mount Teroken

Administration
- Federated States of Micronesia
- State: Chuuk State
- Electoral district: Northern Namoneas
- Municipality: Weno-Choniro

Demographics
- Population: 13,856 (2010)
- Languages: Chuukese

Additional information
- Time zone: UTC (UTC+10)

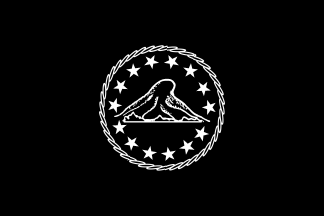
The flag of Weno

Weno (Chuukese: Wééné), formerly Moen, is an island municipality in the Namoneas region of Chuuk Lagoon in Chuuk State, Federated States of Micronesia (FSM). The island has an area of 18.91 square kilometers (7.30 sq mi) and serves as the state capital and main commercial center. As of 2010, the population was 13,856, making it the largest municipality in both the state and the entire country.

According to legend, Sowukachaw, leader of the first Chuukese people, settled on Weno in a place called Wunuunganata (Note: Variously spelled Wunuuganata, Wunuuhanata, Unungonota, or Ulungoneta) (meaning "high place"). It was from here that the sociopolitical hierarchy of Chuuk was established and from where Sowukachaw's descendants eventually spread throughout Weno and other parts of the state. Weno is therefore of special significance to the Chuukese and is regarded as their ancestral homeland. Today, Wunuunganata, now known as Nantaku, is the center of Chuuk's administrative activities and is where the Chuuk State Government complex and other important facilities are located.

== Etymology ==
Weno was known as Moen for much of its colonial history. The name comes from the west coast district of Mwan, which was of high-ranking status when Moen first came into use in the early 19th century. French explorer Jules Dumont d'Urville may have been responsible for the initial mix-up, especially considering that he once mapped the island as "Iros" (or Iras, another historically significant district on Weno).

During the Japanese occupation, in 1918, Weno was given the name Harushima (春島), meaning "Spring Island." This was part of a systematic renaming process meant to Japanize Micronesia, resulting in Chuuk's islands being named after plants, birds, and the days of the week, among other things. Weno belonged to a group of islands called Shiki-shotō (四季諸島), which translates to "Four Seasons Islands."

Weno is the indigenous name of the island, first appearing on maps as "Wola" or "Uola." It is derived from Proto-Micronesian *tokolau, meaning "northerly" or "from the north"; cognates such as Anutan tokerau and Fijian tokalau also suggest that it can more specifically refer to the northeast. Thus, the name appears to have originally functioned as a geographic descriptor of the island's placement in Chuuk Lagoon.

Weno was officially reclaimed as the island's name on October 24, 1989, (Note: Effective retroactively as of October 1) when the Chuuk State Constitution was approved by referendum. One of the main points of the conference was to change place names throughout the state, including those of nearly all the islands, so that they reflected the native Chuukese language and pronunciation. In this same proposal, Truk was changed to Chuuk, Dublon to Tonoas (Tonowas), and so on.

== History ==
=== Prehistory ===
Oral tradition holds that Weno's first settlers came from Kosrae, arriving sometime in the 14th century. Archaeological evidence on the island appears to support this, with extensive human settlement beginning around 1305 AD, although unburned logs excavated in Iras have been dated to as early as 565 BC.

=== European contact ===
Spanish explorer Alonso de Arellano discovered Chuuk on January 17, 1565, during a cross-Pacific voyage to the Philippines aboard the San Lucas. Upon entering the lagoon through the Northeast Pass, Arellano likely interacted with the inhabitants of Weno when several natives were brought on board and directed him toward their island of "Huruasa," believed to be an early phonetic rendering of Iras village. (Note: Interestingly, Hezel does not address this detail and instead claims that the San Lucas was headed for Tonoas) However, the sudden appearance of hundreds of canoes "overloaded with people and weapons" forced the crew to change course, and they continued their journey west the next morning without stepping foot on any of the islands.

The earliest recorded landing on Weno took place much later in October 1844, when Scottish trader Andrew Cheyne visited the lagoon in search of bêche-de-mer. At first, the locals were friendly and helped erect curing sheds on a beach, so much so that Cheyne left his schooner there to establish relations at another village. But two days later, a massive surprise attack left six of his men dead and another five severely wounded, leading to the popularization of the term "Dreaded Hogoleu." Although Cheyne did not specify where this took place, historians believe that the "Hogoleu" he wrote about was, indeed, Weno.

=== Colonial era ===
==== Spanish rule (1885–1899) ====
Rev. Robert W. Logan

Weno was placed under Spanish rule on December 17, 1885, when the Carolines Question was settled between Spain and Germany. Spain ultimately visited the lagoon on only three occasions, however, and any impact they had on the local population proved ephemeral. This era was instead dominated by people from outside of Spain, such as ABCFM missionary Robert Logan. Logan arrived on Weno a year earlier in October 1884, becoming the first American missionary in Chuuk Lagoon. Foreign traders also began to establish themselves on Weno during this time, most notably Mori Koben in 1892.

==== German rule (1899–1914) ====
Weno became part of the German Empire on October 12, 1899, with a flag-raising ceremony held on Pohnpei. Shortly afterward, seven traders (Note: Six Japanese and one Chinese; only Mori was left behind) residing on Weno were deported as part of Germany's efforts to confiscate firearms and ammunition from the region. (Note: Berg claims that this took place in 1900, whereas Hezel places it in 1901; Peattie inexplicably cites both years on separate pages) This was not so much to ensure public safety, however, but more so to pave the way for the administration's copra operations; six to seven thousand palms were planted on Weno as a result. Attempts were also made to bring Catholicism to the island, but the locals remained particularly resistant even after the Japanese took over in 1914.

==== Japanese rule (1914–1945) ====
Haru-jima kōgakkō (春島公学校), 1931

Weno was annexed by Japan on October 12, 1914, when the Kurama (鞍馬) and a cruiser escort sailed into the lagoon virtually unimpeded. Governance was initially afforded to the Provisional South Seas Defense Force, then to the South Seas Agency beginning in 1922. Locals were subject to extreme Japanization during this period, especially in the form of public school education. As author Mark Peattie writes, schools like Haru-jima kōgakkō (春島公学校) served "as a means to insure the obedient and loyal acquiescence of Micronesian peoples," and thus were made compulsory for all children.

During World War II, most of Weno was claimed by the Japanese for farmland or military use. This included a large airfield constructed in Iras in 1942, followed by a combined airfield and seaplane base in Neiwe (Neauo) between 1943 and 1944. Many local Chuukese were forced to work on these projects, and entire villages had no choice but to relocate to other parts of the island. Locals were even denied access to their own crops, leading to widespread starvation and death. Only in rare cases were friendly relations established with the Japanese, such as in the account of Katin Nikkichiinnap. Nevertheless, the wartime conditions on Weno are often described as the worst in the lagoon.

Conditions among the Japanese forces were equally severe, if not worse. When the Allies finally landed on Weno in September 1945, it was found that bugs and worms had so ravaged their sweet potato crop that all the troops were suffering from malnutrition. As the U.S. Naval inspection party later described:

Rank upon rank of living scarecrows lined up along the route ... men with ankles as thin as skinny wrists, with sunken cheeks, and with every rib showing sharply.

In total, 7,886 Japanese were left on Weno at the time of surrender—down from a reported 8,993 (Note: 2,962 Army, 5,718 Navy, and 313 medical personnel) at the war's peak.

=== Postwar era ===
TTPI Truk District Police Headquarters, 1978

Formal Japanese surrender of Chuuk took place aboard the USS Portland on September 2, 1945. The U.S. military moved onto Weno shortly afterward, setting up their headquarters in Mechitiw and raising the American flag on November 25. Full administrative control was granted to the United States two years later on July 18, 1947, when the Caroline, Mariana, and Marshall archipelagos were incorporated as the Trust Territory of the Pacific Islands (TTPI). Weno served as one of six district centers in the TTPI, the others being Chalan Kanoa, Saipan; Koror, Palau; Colonia, Yap; Kolonia, Pohnpei; and Majuro, Marshall Islands.

Weno was chosen as the administrative center in Chuuk for several reasons, despite most of Japan's military activity having taken place on nearby Tonoas. The decision was primarily driven by Brigadier General Robert Blake, who urged that Weno's north airfield be repaired and that all installations and activities be concentrated on the island. Tonoas, meanwhile, was still in Japanese hands "for the purpose of administration, control, and demobilization," with some 30,000 troops awaiting trial or repatriation. Furthermore, the facilities on Tonoas had suffered extensive damage from Allied bombings, and U.S. leadership reportedly did not want to associate itself with anything that could be interpreted "as a memorial of Japanese rule."

=== Independence ===
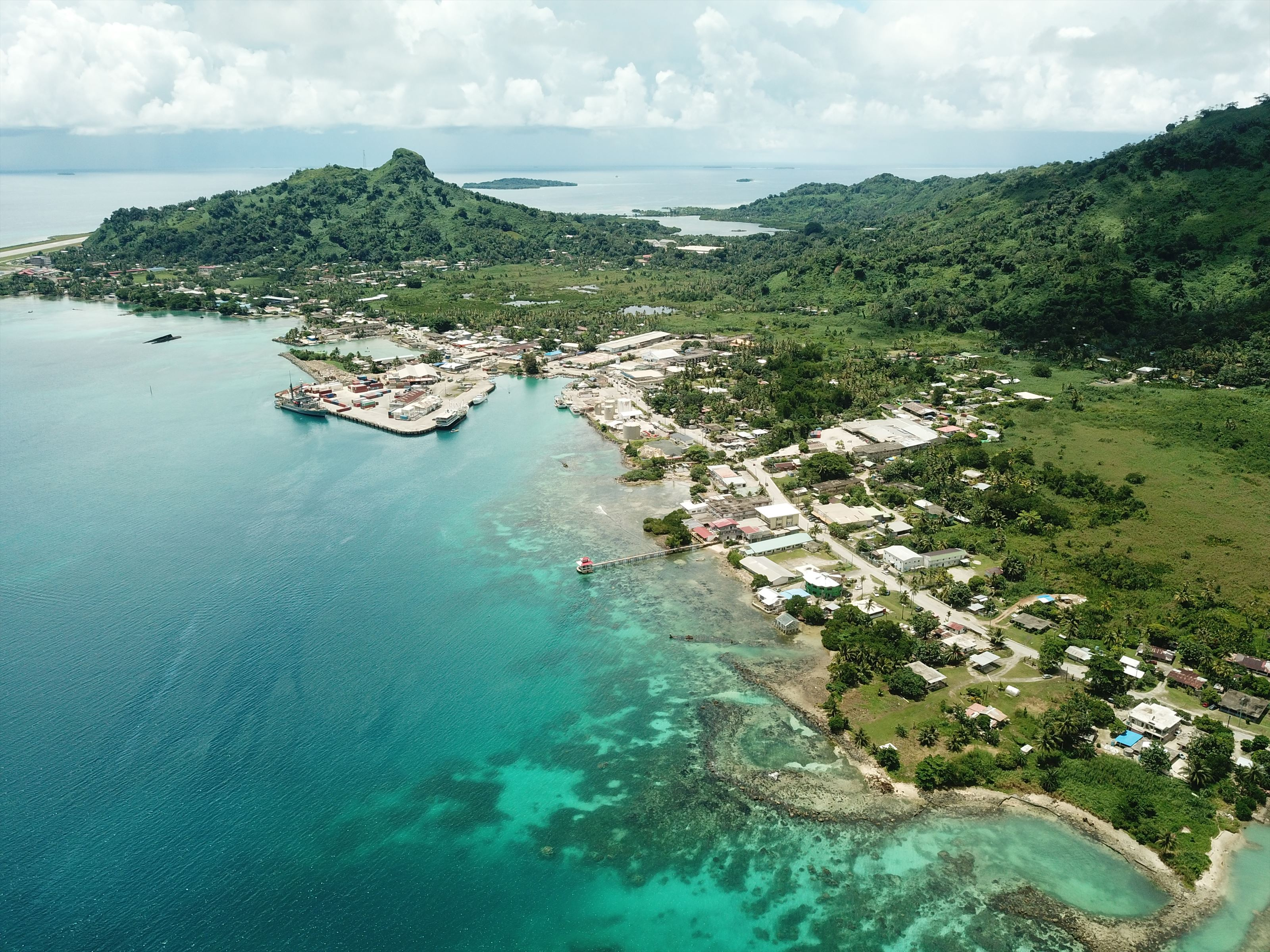
Northwest coast of Weno

On May 10, 1979, the Federated States of Micronesia, comprising Chuuk, Kosrae, Pohnpei, and Yap, adopted its constitution to become a new self-governing nation. The FSM subsequently entered a Compact of Free Association with the United States on November 3, 1986, and was accepted as a member of the United Nations on September 17, 1991. Weno, with its existing infrastructure and growing population, naturally became the capital of Chuuk State.

The current government complex on Weno is located in Nantaku, at the base of Mount Tonnachau. Completed in January 2019, the complex covers 15,230 square meters (163,934 sq ft) of land and features an administration building, legislative building, conference room, equipment room, and guard room. It was designed by Liaoning Provincial Building Design and Research Institute and built by Yanjian Group, both based in China. Funding was provided by a grant commitment of RMB 76 million (~$11.09 million).

== Geography ==
Weno lies at coordinates 7°26′24″N 151°52′8″E in the Namoneas region of Chuuk Lagoon. It is approximately 1,019 kilometers (633 mi) southeast of Guam and covers a total land area of 18.91 km^{2} (7.30 sq mi), making it the second largest island in the state. (Note: Tol, located in Faichuk at the opposite end of the lagoon, is slightly larger at 20.49 square kilometers (7.91 sq mi)) Immediately north of Weno is the small island of Fono, and immediately south of Weno are the islands of Tonoas and Fefen.

The island's terrain is generally mountainous, forcing most of its population to live along the coast. Some areas are relatively flat, however, either due to reclaimed land or the extensive infrastructure built during World War II. The highest point on Weno is Mount Teroken (Note: Sometimes called Mount Chukumong, although this could be an entirely separate peak) at 369 meters (1,211 ft). Other notable peaks on the island include Mount Witipwon (273 m), Mount Chukuwen (236 m), and Mount Tonnachau (228 m).

=== Geology ===
General soil map of Weno (left)

Weno, as well as the other islands in Chuuk Lagoon, is the remnant of a large shield volcano, having stretched some 4,877 m (16,000 ft) from the seafloor to the surface. Fossilized foraminifera found in limestone fragments within the central crater date back to the Early Miocene, indicating the volcano grew to sea level around this time. Large amounts of pyroclastic rock were released into the air, and lava flows emerged from an underground network of fissure vents. Eventually, the volcano was heavily eroded, experienced a final round of nepheline lava eruptions, and subsided, allowing the surrounding barrier reef to grow and form the modern lagoon.

Lava flows make up 90 to 95% of Weno's volcanic sequence. They are compact and columnar-jointed, averaging between 10 and 30 m (35 and 100 ft) in thickness, and are exposed for over a mile in some places. The predominant rock type is olivine basalt, comprising about 60% of lavas. Large amounts can be found along the jungle-covered slopes of Mount Winifourer, lying beneath a thick sequence of nonporphyritic and slightly porphyritic andesite flows. Nonporphyritic andesite is also common, particularly on the south slope of Mount Witipwon, where it is overlain by a layer of sodic trachyte measuring over 45 m (150 ft) thick.

The remaining 5 to 10% of the volcanic sequence is made up of pyroclastic deposits, primarily unstratified breccias and conglomerates. The thickest deposits can be found in the north and central parts of the island; for instance, cobble and boulder conglomerate on the northeast slope of Mount Tonnachau measures 15 m (50 ft) thick and pinches out laterally to the east and south. Breccia is generally more thoroughly indurated, however, and reaches up to 90 m (300 ft) thick in the Wichen River valley. Fine tuffaceous material is estimated to make up 20 to 50% of these beds, while the remaining coarse fragments consist of basalts, andesites, and trachytes.

=== Climate ===
Weno has a tropical marine climate, with a dry season from January to March and a wet season from April to December. Weather on the island is generally considered best during the dry season. June to September see the heaviest rainfall and also feature high humidities and constant mosquitoes. July to November can get particularly uncomfortable when the northeast trade winds die down and tropical disturbances are most frequent.

Climate data for Weno
Month	Jan	Feb	Mar	Apr	May	Jun	Jul	Aug	Sep	Oct	Nov	Dec	Year
Mean daily maximum °C (°F)	31 (87)	30.2 (86.4)	30.4 (86.7)	30.6 (87.1)	30.9 (87.6)	30.7 (87.2)	30.9 (87.7)	30.8 (87.4)	31.0 (87.8)	31.3 (88.3)	31.3 (88.3)	30.9 (87.7)	30.8 (87.4)
Mean daily minimum °C (°F)	24.4 (75.9)	24.6 (76.2)	24.7 (76.4)	24.7 (76.4)	24.5 (76.1)	24 (76)	24 (75)	23.5 (74.3)	23.7 (74.7)	23.6 (74.5)	24.3 (75.8)	24.1 (75.3)	24.2 (75.6)
Average precipitation mm (inches)	250 (9.7)	210 (8.1)	230 (9.2)	320 (12.5)	310 (12.3)	330 (12.9)	340 (13.2)	360 (14.1)	360 (14.3)	280 (11)	290 (11.4)	270 (10.8)	3,550 (139.6)
Source: Weatherbase

=== Biodiversity ===
The high mountains of Weno are covered with dense forests of banyan and pandanus trees, as well as several endemic plant species such as Ficus trukensis, Schefflera kraemeri, and Clinostigma carolinensis. Dense vegetation also covers the lower slopes but is increasingly being replaced by breadfruit and coconut groves. Taro is another crop commonly grown on the island.

Weno is home to unique animal species including Pteropus insularis, Acladocricus setigerus, and Simulium trukense. Metabolus rugensis, also known as the Chuuk monarch, is the state bird and is prominently featured on a 1998 FSM postage stamp.

== Administration ==
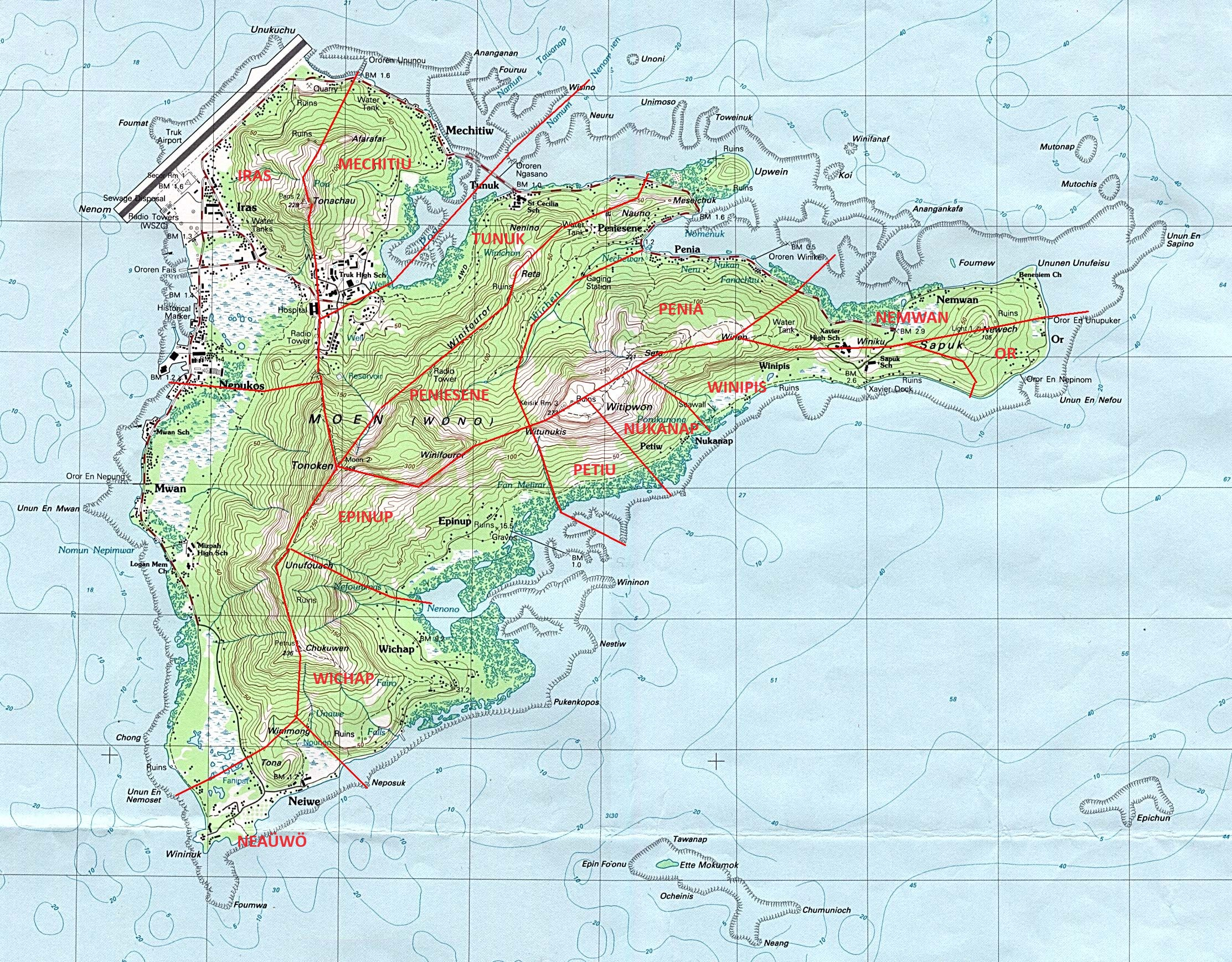
Weno districts (Bryan)

=== Electoral district ===
Weno, along with Fono and Piis-Paneu, is part of the Northern Namoneas electoral district. It is one of five electoral districts in Chuuk State and one of 10 in the greater FSM. Similar to the other districts, Northern Namoneas elects a senator every two years to serve in the Congress of the Federated States of Micronesia.

=== Representative district ===
The electoral districts in Chuuk are divided into representative districts based on population and geographical configuration. Northern Namoneas consists of only one representative district, Representative District 1, which is allotted five members in the Chuuk State House of Representatives.

=== Municipality ===
Weno makes up the primary landmass of Weno-Choniro municipality. It is one of 40 municipalities in the state and is the largest by area and population. Surrounding islets such as Etten Mokumok and Pisin Ferit are included under its administrative banner, though they are small and uninhabited.

=== Subdivisions ===
Since Japanese times, Weno has been divided into administrative units called kumi (組):

- Ichku division (Ichkumi) – Consists of Iras, Mechitiw, and Tunnuk, as well as nearby Piis-Paneu.
- Niku division (Nikumi) – Consists of Nepukos and Mwan (Sefin).
- Sangku division (Sangkumi) – Consists of Neiwe, Wichap, and Epinup.
- Yongku division (Yongkumi) – Consists of Penia and Peniesene.
- Koku division (Kokumi) – Consists of Sapuk (Nemwan, Eor, Winipis, and Nukanap).

These units dictate local electoral politics and representation, and also serve as a framework for allocating public resources and funding.

=== Villages ===
Weno villages by population (2010)
Name	Division	Population
Iras	Ichkumi	2,511
Mechitiw	Ichkumi	1,646
Tunnuk	Ichkumi	780
Nepukos	Nikumi	2,314
Mwan	Nikumi	1,417
Neiwe	Sangkumi	1,385
Wichap	Sangkumi	1,233
Epinup	Sangkumi	333
Peniesene	Yongkumi	551
Penia	Yongkumi	489
Sapuk	Kokumi	1,197

== Economy ==
=== Tourism ===
Divers exploring a wreck in Chuuk Lagoon

Wreck diving is the main tourist attraction in Chuuk. The industry was established by local resident Kimiuo Aisek, who opened the first dive shop on Weno in November 1973. Chuuk State's first museum, the Kimiuo Aisek Memorial Museum, was built adjacent to the dive shop in 2014 to honor Aisek's legacy and the preservation of Chuuk's underwater heritage.

There are currently four dive operators based on Weno:

- Blue Lagoon Dive Shop
- Truk Lagoon Dive Center
- Truk Ocean Service
- Treasures

=== Transportation ===
==== Land ====
The main road on Weno encircles about four-fifths of the island. Aside from the downtown section, most of the road is unpaved and in a chronic state of disrepair, and efforts to improve it never seem to materialize. No public transport exists, but visitors can ride a taxi for $1 to $3 depending on their destination. Car rentals cost around $70 per day.

==== Air ====
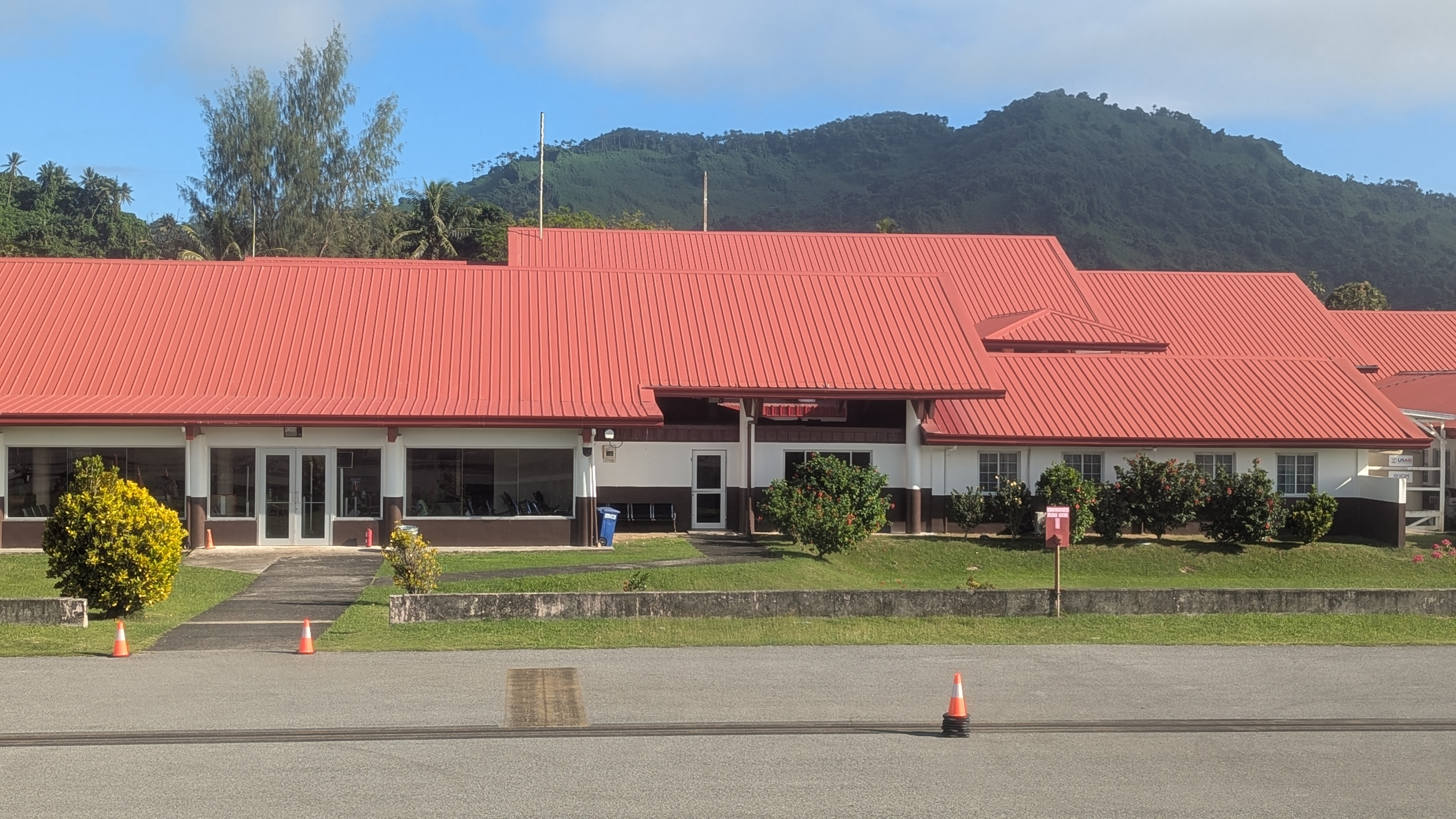
Chuuk International Airport (TKK)

Chuuk International Airport (TKK) in Iras is the only airport offering flights to and from the state. It is one of the stops along the island hopper route between Hawaii and Guam, served three times a week in each direction via United Airlines. TKK is also used to access landing strips on the outer islands of Houk, Onoun, and Ta. Flights are sporadically available via chartered flight service Caroline Islands Air.

==== Sea ====
Weno has only one commercial port, located in Nepukos. It serves both large cargo ships and the occasional passenger voyages that pass through the region. Flanking it on either side are two smaller docking areas reserved for motor boats and fishing vessels. These are mainly used by locals for travel between Weno and other parts of the lagoon.

=== Organizations ===
==== Chuuk Women's Council ====
The Chuuk Women's Council (CWC) is a non-governmental organization based in Nepukos. Founded in 1984, the CWC encompasses more than 60 women's groups throughout the state with the goal of empowering and achieving gender equality for women. Their work has led to bans on alcohol and, most notably, an increase in the age of consent from 13 to 18. They also operate where government and state agencies fall short, providing essential community resources, health education, and child services.

==== International Organization for Migration ====
The International Organization for Migration Micronesia (IOM) operates a sub-office in Nepukos, which provides local humanitarian support and disaster relief. Following Typhoon Sinlaku in early 2026, assessment teams reached out to more than 11,100 people throughout the state, including the villages of Iras, Nepukos (Meseiset), and Sapuk on Weno. Disaster aid was provided in the form of kitchen sets, shelter materials, and WASH kits, among other things. The IOM also oversaw repairs to the Chuuk State Hospital roof.

== Demographics ==
Weno had a population of 13,856 at the 2010 census. This was a 0.2% increase from the previous census held in 2000. More than 96% of the population was indigenous Chuukese, (Note: Including Mortlockese) while Asians constituted the second-largest group at 0.63%. Males slightly outnumbered females by 1.6% of the total population. The median age was 21.5 years.

=== Languages ===
The official languages on Weno are English and Chuukese, the latter of which also serves as the state language. Chuukese is an Austronesian language of the Micronesian subbranch and is closely related to other Chuukic languages such as Woleaian and Puluwatese. Due to historic trade patterns, the dialect spoken on Weno is most linguistically similar to Mortlockese, another Chuukic language spoken in the Mortlocks.

=== Religion ===
Religion on Weno (2010)
1. Congregationalist (47.5%)
2. Roman Catholic (46.0%)
3. Latter-day Saint (1.89%)
4. Seventh-day Adventist (0.89%)
5. Pentecostal (0.84%)
6. Baptist (0.79%)
7. Apostolic (0.48%)
8. Assembly of God (0.45%)
9. Other (0.99%)
10. None (0.09%)

A majority of Weno's population identifies as Christian. This can be traced back to the island's colonial settlement, first by Protestant missionaries in the late 19th century and then by Catholic missionaries in the early 20th century. In 2010, there was a near-even split between these two groups, with 47.5% being Congregationalist and 46.0% being Roman Catholic. Significant minorities included Latter-day Saints (1.89%), Seventh-day Adventists (0.89%), and Pentecostals (0.84%). Only 0.09% identified as non-religious.

=== Education ===
The Chuuk State Department of Education operates seven public elementary schools and one public high school on Weno. There is also one charter school, five private schools, and two post-secondary institutions on the island.

==== Public schools ====
- Iras Demo Elementary School, Iras
- Mwan Elementary School, Mwan (Sefin)
- Neauo Elementary School, Neiwe
- Wichap Elementary School Annex, Wichap
- Mechitiw Elementary School, Mechitiw
- Penia & Peniesene Elementary School, Penia
- Sapuk Elementary School, Sapuk (Winipis)
- Chuuk High School, Mechitiw (Nantaku)

==== Charter schools ====
- Akoyikoyi School, Penia

==== Private schools ====
- Berea Christian School, Nepukos
- Saramen Chuuk Academy, Nepukos
- Chuuk Seventh-day Adventist School, Neiwe
- St. Cecilia School, Tunnuk
- Xavier High School, Sapuk (Winipis)

==== Tertiary education ====
- College of Micronesia-FSM Chuuk Campus, Nepukos (Meseiset)
- Caroline College and Pastoral Institute, Nepukos

== Places of interest ==
Children enjoying the view from the Sapuk Lighthouse

Weno has a number of unique places of interest:

- Mount Tonnachau – An octopus-shaped peak widely regarded as the ancient home of Sowukachaw, the founding father of Chuuk.
- Immaculate Heart of Mary Cathedral – Catholic cathedral built in the sixties, located in Tunnuk; serves as the seat of the Diocese of Caroline Islands.
- Wiichen Men's Meetinghouse – Prehistoric site along the Wichen River, featuring a swimming basin, falls, and petroglyphs.
- Xavier High School – Former Japanese communications building turned high school, operated by the Society of Jesus since 1952.
- Sapuk Lighthouse – Japanese lighthouse built in 1937, flanked to the east by four 20-cm Armstrong-Pozzuoli guns—the largest in Chuuk.
- Lava Lava Beach – Public beach in Sapuk, serving as the perfect getaway spot for picnics and other recreational activities.
- Tonotan Guns and Caves – WWII-era tunnels at the base of Mount Teroken; the largest, Nefo Cave, features a 14-cm Vickers gun pointing out toward the west coast.
- Japanese War Memorial – A granite monument inconspicuously located in Nepukos, dedicated to the Japanese servicemen who died in Chuuk during WWII.
- Logan Memorial Church – Historic church named after pioneer missionary Robert Logan, located on the grounds of his former mission station.
- Kimiuo Aisek Memorial Museum – The first museum in Chuuk State, built in 2014; honors the late Kimiuo Aisek and Chuuk's underwater heritage.

== Popular culture ==
=== Television ===
Weno is featured in season 5 episode 10 of Outback Truckers, where two power stations and a switchboard are shipped from Adelaide to provide all-day power for the island.

Weno also appears in season 12 episodes 1 and 2 of Expedition Unknown, where host Josh Gates teams up with Project Recover to map wreckage from Operation Hailstone.

Gates returned to Weno in season 15 episode 6 of Expedition Unknown to locate a downed P-47 Thunderbolt.

=== Video games ===
Weno served as the inspiration for Fort Grays Island in the 2019 video game Ace Combat 7: Skies Unknown.
