= Nomwisofo =

Island group in Faichuk, Chuuk State, Federated States of Micronesia

Native name: Nómwusééfé
- Interactive map of Nomwisofo

Geography
- Location: Pacific Ocean
- Coordinates: 7°22′41″N 151°42′10″E
- Archipelago: Chuuk Islands
- Major islands: Romanum, Udot, Eot, Oan, Fanapanges
- Area: 7.40 km^{2} (2.86 sq mi)
- Highest point: Mount Witonap (241 m)

Administration
- Federated States of Micronesia
- State: Chuuk State
- Electoral district: Faichuk

Demographics
- Population: 3,483
- Languages: Chuukese

Additional information
- Time zone: UTC (UTC+10)

Nomwisofo (Chuukese: Nómwusééfé) is an island group in the Faichuk region of Chuuk Lagoon in Chuuk State, Federated States of Micronesia. It consists primarily of the islands of Romanum, Udot, Eot, Oan, and Fanapanges, as well as smaller islets and reefs in their vicinity. The islands cover a total land area of about 7.40 square kilometers (2.86 sq mi) and had a combined population of 3,483 at the 2010 census.

== Islands ==
The major islands and islets of Nomwisofo are listed below. All except Oan are inhabited.

Island	Municipality	Area (sq mi)	Population (2010)	Highest point	Location
Romanum	Romanum	0.85	865	Newuwoma (55 m)	7°24′39″N 151°40′10″E
Udot	Udot-Fonuweisom	4.47	1,680	Witonap (241 m)	7°22′55″N 151°43′11″E
Eot	Eot	0.39	266	Nekiniaw (62 m)	7°23′11″N 151°44′24″E
Oan	Parem	0.07	n/a	Meseichuk (38 m)	7°21′48″N 151°45′21″E
Fanapanges	Fanapanges	1.62	672	Wichuk (124 m)	7°21′12″N 151°39′54″E

== Administration ==
Nomwisofo, along with Inner Faichuk, is a member of the Faichuk electoral district, which elects a senator every two years to serve in the Congress of the Federated States of Micronesia.

The Nomwisofo islands constitute Representative District 5 in the Chuuk State Legislature. It is allotted two members in the local House of Representatives.
