= Tol (island) =

Island in Federated States of Micronesia

Native name: Toon
- Aerial view of Tol (Wonei not visible)
- Interactive map of Tol

Geography
- Location: Pacific Ocean
- Coordinates: 7°21′24″N 151°36′57″E
- Type: Volcanic
- Archipelago: Chuuk Islands
- Area: 20.49 km^{2} (7.91 sq mi)
- Highest elevation: 446 m (1463 ft)
- Highest point: Mount Winipot

Administration
- Federated States of Micronesia
- State: Chuuk State
- Electoral district: Faichuk
- Municipalities: Oneisom, Tolensom

Demographics
- Population: 5,217 (2010)
- Languages: Chuukese

Additional information
- Time zone: UTC (UTC+10)

Tol (Chuukese: Toon) is an island in the Faichuk region of Chuuk Lagoon in Chuuk State, Federated States of Micronesia. With a land area of 20.49 square kilometers (7.91 sq mi), it is the largest island in the state and had a total population of 5,217 at the 2010 census. Tol is one of three islands that form the Inner Faichuk island group, the others being Paata and Polle.

== Etymology ==
Tol is derived from the Chuukese word Toon meaning "peak," "high point," or "pinnacle." This is a reference to the island's high mountain peaks, particularly Mount Winipot (Winipwéét).

In 1918, Tol was given the name Suiyō Shima (水曜島), meaning "Wednesday Island." It was part of a group of islands spanning Faichuk and Nomwisofo known as Shichiyō Shotō (七曜諸島), named after the seven days of the week.

== History ==
=== Prehistory ===
Tol is located in Chuuk Lagoon, which saw extensive human settlement begin around the 14th century AD.

=== Foreign contact ===
The earliest reported contact with Tol took place in 1861, when four crew members of the shipwrecked Norna managed to escape to the island after being held captive on Fefen. The locals received them warmly and were presented with gifts upon the arrival of HMS Sphinx in March 1862.

=== War in the Pacific ===
U.S. Navy aerial reconnaissance photo of Tol, February 1944

During World War II, 2,160 Army, 203 medical, and a few thousand Navy personnel (Note: The combined Navy total for Inner Faichuk was 6,220) were stationed on Tol. Fortifications on the island included a manned torpedo base, torpedo boat station, observation tower, two searchlights, and several gun and mortar emplacements.

On the second day of Operation Hailstone, the Hanakawa Maru (花川丸) was sunk just off the coast of Tol by an Avenger torpedo bomber. The strikes set her cargo ablaze, and the fire reportedly spread to nearby mangroves and structures. Because of its remote location and toxic leakage, the wreck is one of the least visited in the lagoon.

== Geography ==
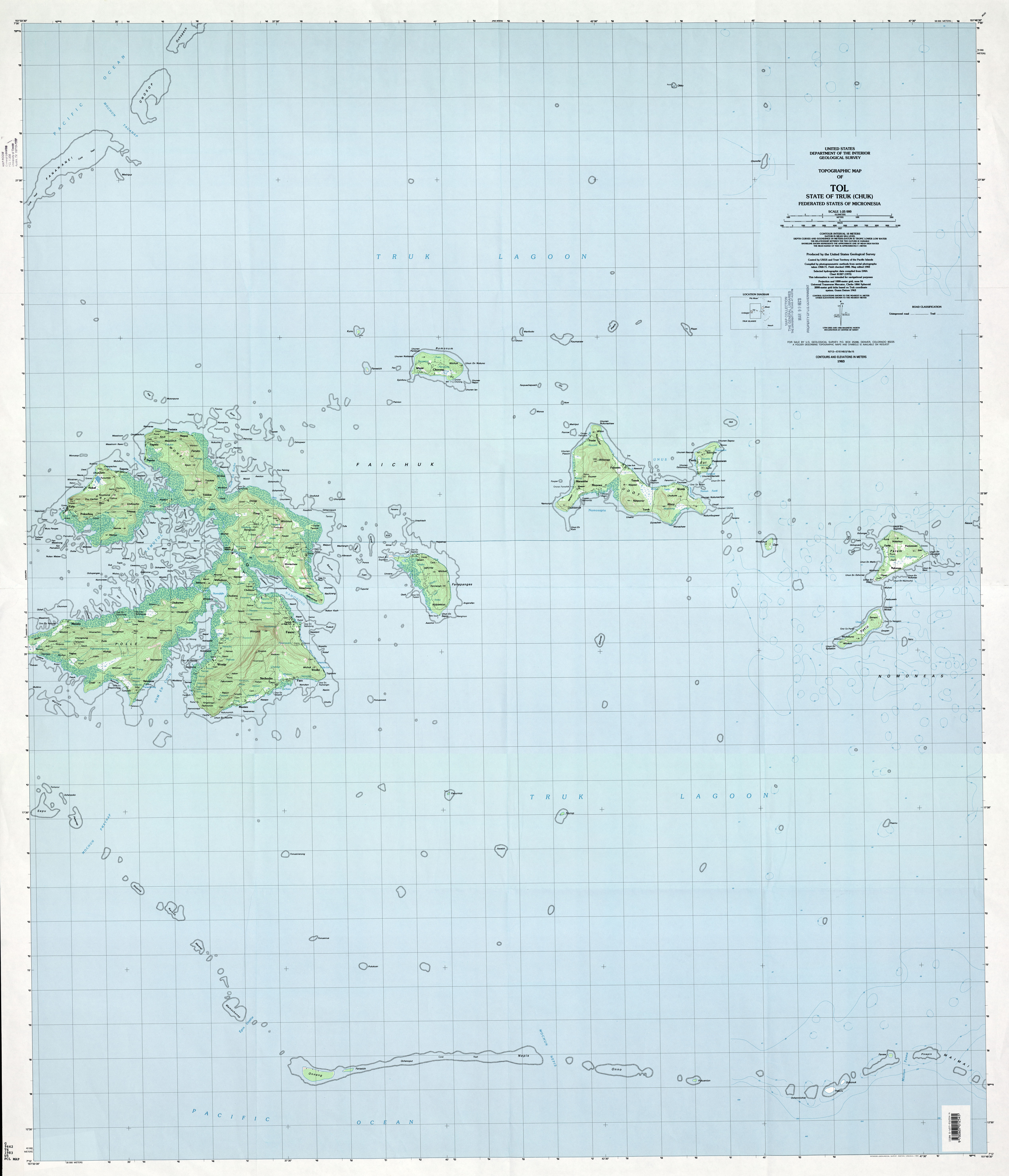
Map of Tol and the surrounding islands

Tol is located at coordinates 7°21′24″N 151°36′57″E in the Faichuk region of Chuuk Lagoon. It is approximately 22.93 kilometers (14.25 mi) southwest of Weno and covers a total land area of about 20.49 km^{2} (7.91 sq mi), making it the largest island in the state. It also boasts the state's highest elevation, Mount Winipot, at 446 meters (1,463 ft). The summit is the only known habitat of the great Truk white-eye (Rukia ruki).

Tol is one of three islands that make up the Inner Faichuk island group. It forms the entirety of the group's eastern half, with Paata lying to the northwest and Polle to the southwest. Because of their close proximity, Paata and Polle are often subsumed under the much larger Tol and mistaken for mere peninsulas jutting out from it. However, Paata is connected to Tol only by mangroves, creating the illusion of a continuous landmass, while Polle is separated from Tol by a natural channel. (Note: Called Neout or Neeyéwút)

Tol itself is divided into two major regions. Its northern peninsula, Wonei (also Onei), accounts for 4.10 km^{2} (1.58 sq mi) of the island. It is treated as a separate island entity by locals but is in fact connected to the rest of Tol by a narrow isthmus, which serves as a natural boundary between Oneisom and Tolensom municipalities. The remainder of Tol forms Tol proper and is cut roughly in half by the Netutu canal connecting Tol Harbor to Lemotol Bay.

== Administrative divisions ==
=== Electoral district ===
Tol is part of the Faichuk electoral district, which includes Inner Faichuk and the Nomwisofo islands of Romanum, Udot, Eot, and Fanapanges. Similar to the other electoral districts in Chuuk State, Faichuk elects a senator every two years to serve in the Congress of the Federated States of Micronesia.

=== Representative districts ===
Faichuk is broken down into representative districts based on population and geographical configuration. Oneisom, along with Paata and Polle, is a member of Representative District 6, while Tolensom makes up the entirety of Representative District 7. They are allotted two and three members in the Chuuk State House of Representatives, respectively.

=== Municipalities ===
Tol is the only island in Chuuk State that is divided into two distinct municipalities: Oneisom and Tolensom. Oneisom municipality is situated on Tol's Wonei peninsula, adjacent to Paata, while Tolensom municipality occupies the remainder of the island.

=== Kumi ===
Since Japanese times, Tolensom has been divided into administrative units called kumi (組):

- Yongku division (Yongkumi) – Consists of Foup, Foupo, and Amwachang.
- Ikku division (Ikkumi; also Ichku/Ichkumi) – Consists of Wichukuno, Chukienu, and Fason.
- Niku division (Nikumi) – Consists of Winifei, Faro, Nechocho, and Munien.
- Sangku division (Sangkumi) – Consists entirely of Wonip.

These divisions dictate local electoral politics, resource allocation, and sporting events.

=== Villages ===
Tol villages by population (2010)
Name	Unit	Municipality	Population
Nepos		Oneisom	66
Peniata		Oneisom	247
Sapitiu		Oneisom	166
Nukanap		Oneisom	17
Tolokas		Oneisom	142
Foup	Yongkumi	Tolensom	783
Foupo	Yongkumi	Tolensom	503
Amwachang	Yongkumi	Tolensom	80
Wichukuno	Ikkumi	Tolensom	322
Chukienu	Ikkumi	Tolensom	303
Fason	Ikkumi	Tolensom	685
Winifei	Nikumi	Tolensom	195
Faro	Nikumi	Tolensom	217
Nechocho	Nikumi	Tolensom	193
Munien	Nikumi	Tolensom	286
Wonip	Sangkumi	Tolensom	1,012

== Demographics ==
Tol is the second most populated island in Chuuk State with a total population of 5,217 at the 2010 census. The major statistics for its two municipalities are listed below.

Municipality	Population (2010)	Male (%)	Female (%)	Median age	Roman Catholic (%)	Congregtionalist (%)
Oneisom	638	53.6	46.4	19.4	87.6	10.5
Tolensom	4,579	52.2	47.8	18.4	23.8	75.0

== Places of interest ==
The Hanakawa Maru (花川丸)

Tol has a number of unique places of interest:

- Mount Winipot – At 446 m, it is the highest peak in Chuuk State. It is also home to the endemic great Truk white-eye.
- Netutu Canal – Artificial waterway that cuts straight through the island, dug using forced labor during the Japanese occupation in the 1930s.
- Hanakawa Maru – Japanese freighter sunk just off the southeastern coast of Tol, noted for its remote location and toxic leakage.
- Jesuit Mission – Former Jesuit mission built along the Netutu Canal, featuring a church and the old St. Julia School. The school currently operates as Foup Elementary School under the Chuuk State Department of Education.
- Fauba Archaeological Site – Prehistoric stoneworks on the hill overlooking Foupo, believed to have served defensive purposes.
- Faithwalk Christian College – Formerly Micronesia Institute of Biblical Studies and Pacific Islands Bible College, based in Chukienu; offers two- and four-year degrees in theology.
