= Electoral districts of the Federated States of Micronesia =

The electoral districts of the Federated States of Micronesia are the divisions of Micronesian territory made in elections in the Federated States of Micronesia. These subdivisions are called "districts" in elections for the Congress of the Federated States of Micronesia. In elections for the State Legislatures of Kosrae, Pohnpei, Yap, and the State House of Representatives of Chuuk - there are named senatorial regions for their Senate elections. Local government of municipalities in the Federated States of Micronesia is carried out by elected officials chosen by the inhabitants.

== Elections for Congress of the Federated States of Micronesia ==
The Congress of the Federated States of Micronesia has 14 members elected by first past the post in single-member districts, 10 of whom are elected for two years and 4 for four years. Each state in the Federated States of Micronesia elects a senator to serve a four-year term. The ten senators with a two-year term are elected by one of the ten electoral districts distributed between the four states in proportion to the population:

- Chuuk State
  - Chuuk First Electoral District: Mortlocks
  - Chuuk Second Electoral District: Northern Namoneas
  - Chuuk Third Electoral District: South Namoneas
  - Chuuk Fourth Electoral District: Faichuk
  - Chuuk Fifth Electoral District: Oksoritod
- State of Kosrae
  - Kosrae First Electoral District
- Pohnpei State
  - Pohnpei First Electoral District: Municipalities of Kapingamarangi, Kolonia, Nukuoro, Sapwuahfik, and Sokehs
  - Pohnpei Second Electoral District: Municipalities of Kitti and Madolenihmw
  - Pohnpei Third Electoral District: Municipalities of Mokil, Nett, Pingelap, and Uh
- State of Yap
  - Yap's First Electoral District

== Elections for state legislatures ==
States have their own internal system of government and constitution . The work of the assemblies cannot go against the constitution of their state, the constitution of the Federated States of Micronesia and the laws and regulations passed by the Congress of the Federated States of Micronesia.

=== Chuuk State ===
The state has two chambers: the Senate whose ten members are elected for four years, the House of Representatives which has twenty-eight elected officials chosen for two years. Each of the five senatorial regions chooses two elected representatives by multi-member majority vote in one round. Within senatorial regions, there are one or more legislative constituencies called districts. Each of them allows the election of one or more representatives using the same voting method as for senators.

The first senatorial region, that of Northern Namoneas, includes district 1 which brings together the municipalities of Fono, Piis-Panewu and Weno. He chooses five members to the representative chamber. The Southern Namoneas senatorial region includes three districts.

The second senatorial region covers the municipalities of Etten and Tonowas and chooses two representatives. The municipalities of Fefan, Parem, Tsis and Totiw belong to district 3 which elects three members. District 4 only includes the municipality of Uman which elects two representatives.

The third senatorial region Faichuk elects two representatives each:

- District 5 (Eot, Fanapanges, Ramanum and Udot)
- District 6 (Paata, Polle, Wonei)
- District 7 (Tol Islands)
- District 8 (Nama, Losap and Piis-Emwar)
- District 9 (Namoluk, Ettal, Kuttu and Moch)
- District 10 (Lukunor, Oneop, Satowan and Ta)

The final senatorial region, the North-West Islands or Oksoritod, has three districts that elect one member each:

- District 11 - municipalities of Fananu, Nomwin, Murilo and Ru
- District 12 - municipalities of Magur, Piherarh, Onou, Onoun, Unanu,
- District 13 - municipalities of Houk, Pollap, Polowat, Tamatam.

=== Kosrae State ===
The Legislative Assembly of Kosrae State includes fourteen senators elected for four years by a first-past-the-post plurality vote by voters in four legislative constituencies called districts. The district of Lelu has five, Malem has three, Tafunsak has four and Utwe has two.

=== Pohnpei State ===
The Legislative Assembly in Pohnpei State is composed of twenty-three elected officials for four-year terms chosen from eleven districts. Each district corresponds to a unique municipality. The first three districts (Kitti, Madolenihmw, Sokehs) elect four members, (Kolonia, Nett, Uh) elect two each and the others (Kapingamarangi, Mokil, Nukuoro, Pingelap, Sapwuahfik) only one elected.

=== Yap State ===
The Legislative Assembly of Yap State consists of ten senators elected for four years in a legislative constituency called a district. The first district, that of the Yap Islands, which has the largest population, which sees six senators elected according to a multi-member majority vote in one round. The other four districts each elect only one representative by first-past-the-post. The second district includes the municipalities of Fais, Ngulu, Ulithi the uninhabited municipality of Sorol. The third district concerns Woleai Municipality The municipalities of Eauripik, Faraulep and Ifalik are grouped in the fourth district, the municipalities of Elato, Lamotrek and Satawal in the fifth.

== Elections for municipalities ==
The municipalities of the Federated States of Micronesia constitute the second level administrative subdivision, the first being the States. Municipalities can group together several localities, the main one of which generally has the same name as that of the municipality. Aside from the cases of Kolonia for Pohnpei and Weno for Chuuk State, the state capitals, Colonia for Yap, Tofol for Kosrae, and the federal capital, Palikir, are in municipalities with different names. Chuuk State consists of forty municipalities, Kosrae State has four, Pohnpei State eleven municipalities, and Yap State twenty-one. The functioning of municipalities is ensured by representatives elected by residents.
