= Faichuk =

Region in Chuuk State, Federated States of Micronesia

Native name: Fááyichuk
- Interactive map of Faichuk

Geography
- Location: Pacific Ocean
- Coordinates: 7°21′59″N 151°39′25″E
- Archipelago: Chuuk Islands
- Major islands: Romanum, Udot, Eot, Oan, Fanapanges, Tol, Paata, Pwene
- Area: 41.18 km^{2} (15.90 sq mi)
- Highest point: Mount Winipot (446 m)

Administration
- Federated States of Micronesia
- State: Chuuk State
- Electoral district: Faichuk

Demographics
- Population: 11,305 (2010)
- Languages: Chuukese

Additional information
- Time zone: UTC (UTC+10)

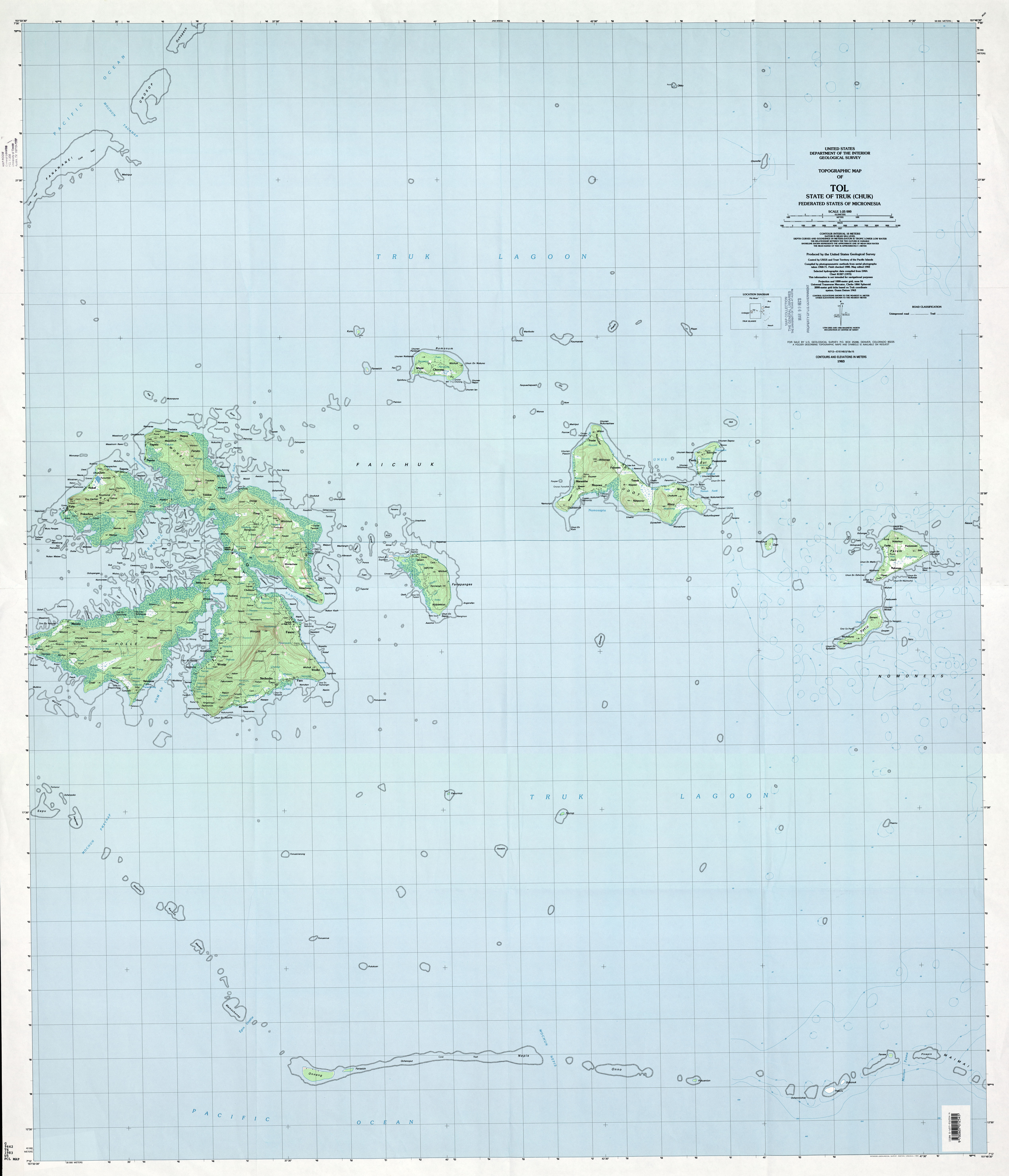
Map of Faichuk islands (including Parem and Totiw)

Faichuk (Chuukese: Fááyichuk) is a region and electoral district in Chuuk State, Federated States of Micronesia (FSM). It consists of the eight major islands and islets in the western half of Chuuk Lagoon, as well as many smaller islets and reefs in their vicinity. The islands cover a total land area of about 41.18 square kilometers (15.90 sq mi) and had a combined population of 11,305 at the 2010 census.

== Etymology ==
Faichuk literally translates to "lower mountains." It is derived from the stem faa-, meaning "under" or "underside," and the word chuuk, meaning "mountain." Considering the islands' placement in Chuuk Lagoon, Goodenough also suggests that it could simply mean "western mountains."

== Islands ==
The major islands and islets of Faichuk are listed below, organized by subregion. All except Oan are inhabited.

Subregion	Island	Municipality	Area (km^{2})	Population (2010)	Highest point	Location
Nomwisofo	Romanum	Romanum	0.85	865	Newuwoma (55 m)	7°24′39″N 151°40′10″E
Nomwisofo	Udot	Udot-Fonuweisom	4.47	1,680	Witonap (241 m)	7°22′55″N 151°43′11″E
Nomwisofo	Eot	Eot	0.39	266	Nekiniaw (62 m)	7°23′11″N 151°44′24″E
Nomwisofo	Oan	Parem	0.07	n/a	Meseichuk (38 m)	7°21′48″N 151°45′21″E
Nomwisofo	Fanapanges	Fanapanges	1.62	672	Wichuk (124 m)	7°21′12″N 151°39′54″E
Inner Faichuk	Tol	Oneisom	4.10	638	Fanato (Note: Bryan names a Mt. Tolodon in roughly the same location, but the listed elevation is slightly lower than that of Mt. Räs (Tolokas)) (180 m)	7°22′58″N 151°36′11″E
Inner Faichuk	Tol	Tolensom	16.40	4,579	Winipot (446 m)	7°20′56″N 151°37′17″E
Inner Faichuk	Paata	Paata-Tupunion	4.20	1,107	Foumuna (185 m)	7°22′28″N 151°35′6″E
Inner Faichuk	Polle	Polle	9.09	1,498	Winimas (186 m)	7°20′14″N 151°34′59″E

== Administration ==
The Faichuk islands constitute the Faichuk electoral district. It is one of five electoral districts in Chuuk State and one of 10 in the greater FSM. Similar to the other districts, Faichuk elects a senator every two years to serve in the Congress of the Federated States of Micronesia.

Faichuk is broken down into representative districts based on population and geographical configuration:

- Representative District 5 – Consists of the Nomwisofo islands (Romanum, Udot, Eot, and Fanapanges).
- Representative District 6 – Consists of Paata, Polle, and Oneisom.
- Representative District 7 – Consists of Tolensom.

Representative Districts 5 and 6 are both allotted two members in the Chuuk State House of Representatives, while Representative District 7 is allotted three members.

== Separatist movement ==
Beginning in 1959, Faichuk has expressed a desire for autonomy and independence from the rest of Chuuk. The movement gained political significance in the late 1970s when a referendum revealed that over 80% of the population was in favor of separation. However, the proposal was ultimately vetoed, and subsequent attempts have similarly fallen short. Modern discourse has since shifted from independence for Faichuk to independence for the entire state of Chuuk.

== See also ==
- Separatism in the Faichuk Islands
