= Separatism in Micronesia =

This is an overview of separatism in Micronesia.

== Historical ==
The regions of Palau, the Marshall Islands, and the Northern Mariana Islands were also intended to be part of Micronesia, but this was rejected by them. Palau and the Marshall Islands became separate states, and the Northern Mariana Islands remained as part of the United States.

== Modern ==
=== Chuuk ===
An independence referendum for Chuuk State to secede from the Federated States of Micronesia was originally scheduled to take place in March 2015. However, it has been delayed three times and it is uncertain if it will take place. The most populous of the four states within the FSM, Chuuk has high levels of unemployment and there are long-standing tensions over the distribution of funding within the FSM. Other concerns include political power within the federation and the preservation of cultural identity. In 2012, the Chuuk State Government created the Chuuk Political Status Commission (CPSC) to study potential future statuses for Chuuk. In 2014, the CPSC recommended independence with a separate Compact of Free Association (CFA) with the United States. In 2015, the governor of Chuuk postponed the initial referendum citing the need for greater citizen awareness and a lack of preparedness. The Chuuk State Legislature delayed the second planned referendum in 2019 for a year and also suspended the CPSC. The third delay in February 2020 pushed the referendum back two years to 2022, and the referendum did not take place that year. The CPSC has actively campaigned for independence, holding public hearings both in Chuuk and in areas with significant overseas Chuukese populations. Opposition has come from both civilians and the FSM Government. The potential timing of the referendum is significant, as parts of the current CFA agreement expired in 2023. The United States has stated that a similar agreement would not be offered to an independent Chuuk.

=== Faichuk Islands ===
The separatist movement in the Faichuk Islands is a political movement calling for autonomy and independence for the Faichuk Islands located in the state of Chuuk, in the Federated States of Micronesia, a federal country also made up of the states of Kosrae, Pohnpei and Yap. Map of islands in green on a blue ocean background Location of the Faichuk Islands district in Chuuk Lagoon. Although the Faichuk Islands' separatism emerged in 1959, it did not take on political importance until 1979, and played a major role in national politics until 1983. In 1979, in a referendum, the inhabitants expressed their desire for autonomy through the creation of a state separate from that of Chuuk. In 1980, the Chuuk Legislative Assembly endorsed this move. The following year, after several unsuccessful attempts, a bill to create a Faichuk state was passed by the Congress of the Federated States of Micronesia, but the President of the Federated States of Micronesia, Tosiwo Nakayama, vetoed it in the name of national unity. In 1983, the separatists successfully called on the islanders of the Faichuk Islands to boycott the vote on the Treaty of Free Association with the United States. From then until 2001 the political current calling for autonomy remained barely audible. On that date, a Faichuk constitution explicitly declaring independence was passed by plebiscite, and a unilateral declaration of independence was transmitted to Leo Falcam, President of the Federated States of Micronesia. The leaders of the Faichuk Islands attempted to establish lasting contacts with the United States, with the aim of seeking independence. This goal was soon suspended, however, and several bills for autonomous statehood were unsuccessfully presented to Congress throughout the 2000s. In 2011 two political attempts were made to force their way in. A self-proclaimed Faichuk ambassador appeared before the Chinese ambassador to the Federated States of Micronesia, and an influential separatist leader claimed to be acting president of the Republic of Faichuk. From 2012 onwards, demands appeared to shift from independence for the Faichuk Islands region to independence for the entire state of Chuuk.

=== Kosrae ===
Senator Paliknoa K.Welly advocated for Kosrae secession in 2023. He also sought to appropriate funding for a Kosraean political status commission in the 22nd FSM Congress. Calls for secession were also made by Garson Jackson, a member of the FSM's Joint Committee on Compact Review and Planning, in 2022.

=== Pohnpei ===
Pohnpei secession is advocated for by senators Jayson Walter and Herolyn Semes-Movick. Pohnpei has a political status commission.

=== Yap ===
In June 2024, a referendum to review Yap's political status narrowly passed.
