= Fauba Archaeological Site =

Prehistoric stoneworks in Micronesia

- U.S. National Register of Historic Places
- Location within Federated States of Micronesia
- Nearest city: Tol Island, Chuuk State, Federated States of Micronesia
- Area: 4.5 acres (1.8 ha)
- Built: 1810
- NRHP reference No.: 78003152
- Added to NRHP: March 21, 1978

The Fauba Archaeological Site is a prehistoric stoneworks on a mountain ridge on Tol Island in Chuuk State of the Federated States of Micronesia. The site was listed on the United States National Register of Historic Places in 1978, when the region was part of the US-administered Trust Territory of the Pacific Islands.

== Description ==
The site consists of an area enclosed by a stone wall that is roughly triangular in shape. The wall is between 1 and 1.5 metres (3 and 5 ft) in height, and is about 1 metre (3 ft) thick. The enclosed area includes a number of stone platforms, and there is a refuse midden outside the enclosure that is believed to be associated with the site. The exact purpose of the site is a subject of debate: although its siting has obvious military benefits (including commanding views of Chuuk Lagoon and other islands of the atoll, it is not clear that it actually saw military activity.
