= Udot =

Udot or UDOT may refer to the following:

- Udot, Federated States of Micronesia, an island in the Federated States of Micronesia
- Utah Department of Transportation, in Utah, United States of America
