= Proposed Chuukese independence referendum =

Scheduled independence referendum

An independence referendum for Chuuk State to secede from the Federated States of Micronesia was originally scheduled to take place in March 2015. However, it has been delayed three times and it is uncertain if it will take place. The most populous of the four states within the FSM, Chuuk has high levels of unemployment and there are long-standing tensions over the distribution of funding within the FSM. Other concerns include political power within the federation and the preservation of cultural identity.

In 2012, the Chuuk State Government created the Chuuk Political Status Commission (CPSC) to study potential future statuses for Chuuk. In 2014, the CPSC recommended independence with a separate Compact of Free Association (CFA) with the United States. In 2015, the governor of Chuuk postponed the initial referendum citing the need for greater citizen awareness and a lack of preparedness. The Chuuk State Legislature delayed the second planned referendum in 2019 for a year and also suspended the CPSC. The third delay in February 2020 pushed the referendum back two years to 2022, and the referendum did not take place that year.

The CPSC has actively campaigned for independence, holding public hearings both in Chuuk and in areas with significant overseas Chuukese populations. Opposition has come from both civilians and the FSM Government. The potential timing of the referendum is significant, as parts of the current CFA agreement expired in 2023. The United States has stated that a similar agreement would not be offered to an independent Chuuk.

== Background ==
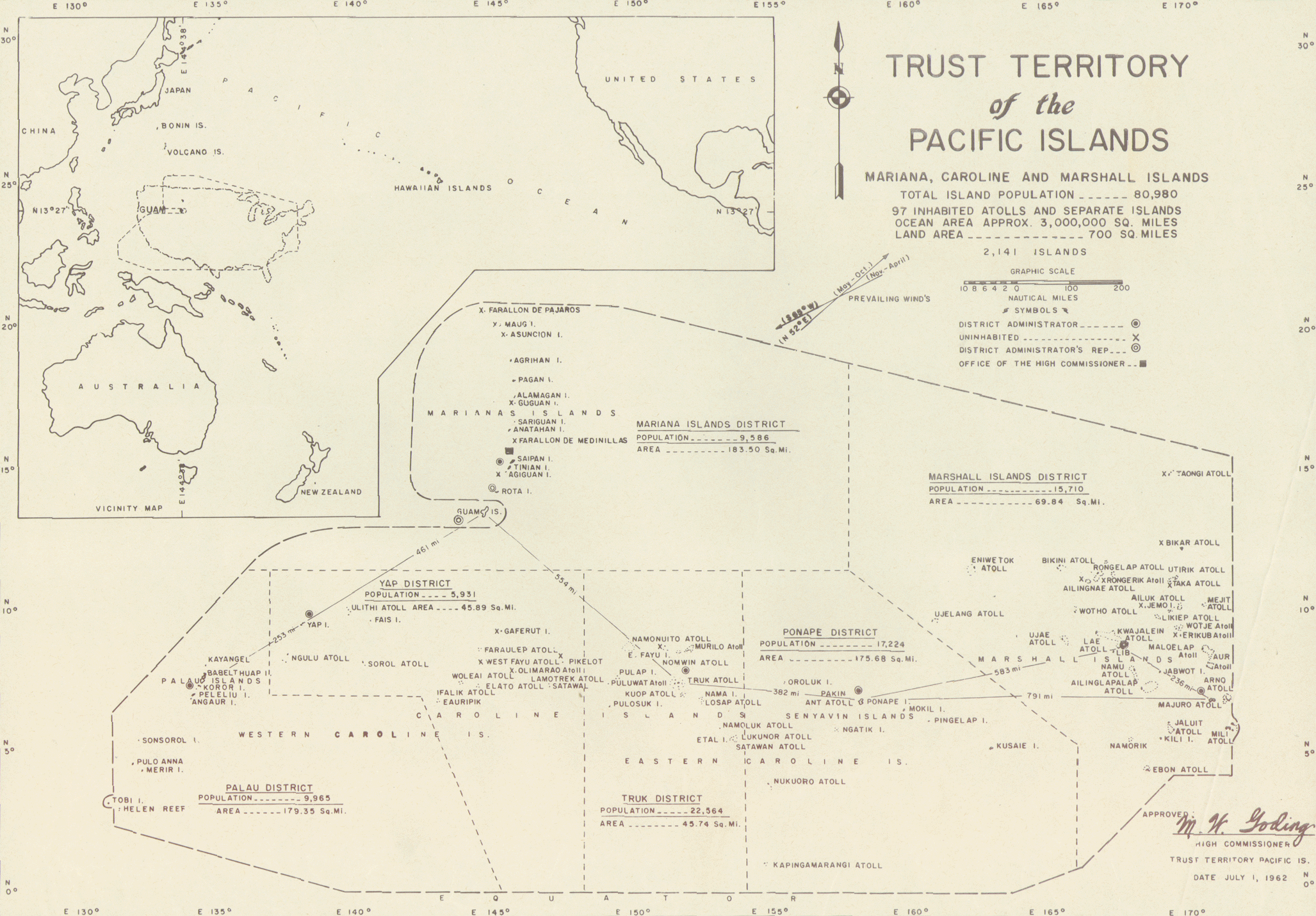
Three of the original polities within the Trust Territory of the Pacific Islands did not join the eventual Federated States of Micronesia.

Islands within Micronesia came under the jurisdiction of the United States in 1947, as the Trust Territory of the Pacific Islands. This territory was divided into six administrative districts: Chuuk, the Marshall Islands, the Northern Mariana Islands, Palau, Pohnpei, and Yap State (Yap). Kosrae was later separated from Pohnpei. Discussions on self-government included an extensive debate over the power of a potential central government compared to the island groups. While the United States wished for the islands to remain united, local political pressure led to the Northern Mariana Islands being separated from the others in the 1970s. Pressure from the Marshall Islands and Palau led the United States to agree that each island group could select its own negotiators; both island groups rejected the Federated States of Micronesia's proposed constitution during a 12 July 1978 referendum.

The remaining four island groups became the Federated States of Micronesia (FSM). This federation signed the Compact of Free Association (CFA) with the United States in 1982. This compact creates an alliance between the FSM and the United States, with the United States military able to enter the territory of the FSM. Under the compact, the United States agreed to provide financial grants to FSM and extend free movement into the United States to FSM citizens. The United States negotiated similar agreements with the now separate Marshall Islands and Palau. The FSM was recognized as an independent state in 1986. Renegotiations between the two countries over the CFA concluded in 2003, extending the deal to 2023. On May 23, 2023, the FSM and the United States entered into another 20-year compact which includes $3.3 billion in funding over the life of the agreement.

The FSM is a loose federation, and ideas relating to the secession of its states have existed since its creation. During the 2003 CFA negotiations, there were rumors that each state would negotiate separate compacts, although this did not happen. State identities are strong, with the central government often seen as distant, and those from other states sometimes considered foreigners. However, Chuuk is the only state in which the executive and legislative branches of government have officially taken up secession. State officials lead the Chuuk Independence Movement.

Among Chuukese and within the Chuuk Government, concerns exist about the distribution of funds among the FSM states. While Chuuk is the most populous state, accounting for almost half of the country's population, it receives only 30% of the financial grants under the CFA. In 2000, its unemployment rate stood at 34.2%, the highest in the country and over 12 percentage points more than the national average. Furthermore, the national government does not share revenue from commercial fishing with the states. Another issue raised by independence campaigners is political power, with the composition of Congress and the presidential election systems designed to dilute the dominance the large population of Chuuk would have on a direct electoral system, and with laws requiring approval by a majority of states as well as a majority of congressional members. Independence is also seen as a way to strengthen Chuukese identity and safeguard Chuukese culture. Independence advocates claim that an independent Chuuk would bring increased economic opportunity, including through control over its exclusive economic zone, generating up to $40 million per year. A new taxation system and the full retention of their taxes would generate further funds. They also claim an independent Chuuk would be able to claim some funds from existing Micronesian funds. They also claim a revised CFA would better suit Chuuk.

Independence advocates saw the Compact renegotiation leading up to the 2023 expiration as an opportunity for Chuuk to negotiate with the United States on its own terms. Chuuk State Attorney General Sabino Asor has said the movement seeks to replicate the CFA for an independent Chuuk. This idea was explicitly rejected by the United States, with its ambassador to FSM engaging in a media campaign to make it clear such an option would not be available.

The legal mechanism by which Chuuk could obtain independence is unclear. One proposal is to ask the other states to amend the FSM constitution following a successful vote. Some independence advocates believe the constitution has no provision to prevent secession. However, others note the constitution obliges all states "to promote the principles of unity". Changing the constitution requires 75% approval, along with the votes of 75% of the states. Even after a successful vote for independence, Chuuk would remain part of FSM for perhaps years as it negotiates its independence. The CPSC claims that Chuuk has the right to declare independence under international law, following the Kosovo precedent. They have also claimed independence is also justified under the United Nations Declaration of Human Rights Article 15.

== Campaign ==
=== Chuuk Political Status Commission and report ===
The Chuuk State Government established the Chuuk Political Status Commission (CPSC) in 2012 through Chuuk State Public Law 11-18 (CSL 11-12-08). This commission had 12 voting members, 10 selected by the five regional groups present in the legislature and two by the governor. The State Senate President and the Speaker of the House of Representatives participated in the CPSC as non-voting members. The new commission was tasked with determining the best future status for Chuuk in light of the upcoming expiry of the CFA.

Under CSL 11-12-18, the CPSC was meant to conduct a public education program in the 18 months following its inception in January 2013 and then submit its final report. In February 2014, the Chuuk State Government extended its mandate for public hearings by seven months. The final report was submitted in 2014. Comparing several options, this report recommended independence with a renegotiated CFA for the future of Chuuk. The report declared other options were "impractical, unrealistic or impossible". The CPSC claimed feedback obtained during meetings and internal discussions were the basis of its report. This, despite few meetings being held, with most of them taking place among overseas communities.

The Chuuk State Legislature accepted the report on 19 December 2014 during a joint session, months before the expiration of the public hearing mandate. Planning then began for a referendum on independence. The timetable provided in the report was an independence referendum in March 2015, after which if independence is voted for a new constitution would be drawn up by October 2015. The new constitution would be put to a referendum in March 2017, after which an election would produce a new government that could declare independence. The referendum was scheduled for 3 March 2015, to coincide with parliamentary elections.

After the adoption of the CPSC's report, then FSM President Manny Mori, himself Chuukese, began to campaign against independence for Chuuk, giving his opinion that the constitution did not allow for a state to secede from the FSM, and warning a "yes" vote would lead not to immediate independence but to a protracted legal battle. Mori stated that individuals within the CPSC were the same as some involved in previous attempts to separate Faichuk from the rest of Chuuk into its own state.

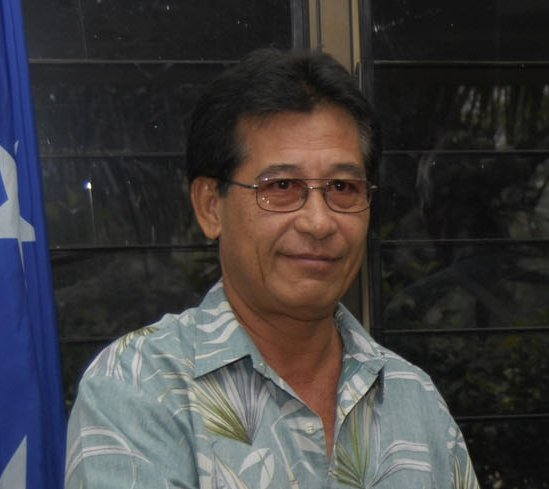
Manny Mori, himself Chuukese, was President of the Federated States of Micronesia during the lead up to the first referendum date and strongly opposed independence.

Videlino Raatior, a former Chuuk resident now living in Hawaii, formed the Chuuk Reform Movement to advocate for continued federation.

Public hearings in late 2014 and early 2015 in response to this report elicited opposition from communities both within and outside of Chuuk. Concerns were raised over the short timeframe between the report's submission and the proposed referendum date. The US Ambassador to the FSM rejected claims by one member of the CPSC that they had discussed the issue with the United States in January 2015.

On 27 January 2015, the legal counsel of the FSM embassy to the United States submitted a memorandum to Mori disputing many claims made in the CPSC's report. On the same date, Mori approved the creation of a task force to campaign against Chuukese independence. This task force included members of the cabinet and other national government officials. It began its own campaign through public hearings within the FSM and abroad. In February 2015 the FSM Department of Justice issued a similar memorandum, claiming the constitution prohibited secession.

=== First delay ===
In late February 2015, Chuuk Governor Johnson Elimo postponed the vote indefinitely through an executive order. The Public Affairs Office released a statement saying that more consultation and awareness was needed. The simultaneous elections were also postponed, because of election material not being ready. Also cited as reasons to delay the referendum were shortcomings in the work of the CPSC, and concerns over the feasibility of holding the referendum simultaneously with the federal elections. Elimo then asked the legislature to determine a new date for the referendum. In response to the postponement, Mori suspended the anti-independence task force, and called for tripartite talks between the FSM, Chuuk, and the United States, to address the concerns underlying the independence campaign.

On 19 November 2015, representatives of Chuuk within the Congress of the Federated States of Micronesia sponsored a resolution to end the CFA.

Sabino Asor remained chair of the CPSC during this new period. The CPSC continued to hold meetings to provide information on independence throughout Chuuk, and in areas with other significant Chuukese populations, such as Guam and Hawaii. They claimed over 50% of the population supported independence.

During this period, former FSM president John Haglelgam warned against independence.

In 2018, the United States Ambassador to the FSM, Robert Riley, said that independence would mean an end to the CFA agreement, and that the United States would not negotiate a similar agreement with an independent Chuuk. Riley listed the benefits of the CFA that Chuuk would lose upon independence, noting that the United States currently funded social programs (including healthcare and college subsidies), provided defense and maritime security, and allowed free movement of Chuuk residents into the United States and its territories.

As of 2018, there were around 45,000 eligible Chuukese voters. While the referendum was scheduled to coincide with the 2019 parliamentary elections, the CSPC and Elimo attempted to move the referendum forward to January 2019, eliciting concern among overseas voters. This proposal was suspended initially until 27 August 2018. One candidate for the FSM congress from Northwest Chuuk expressed a desire for the outer island regions in Chuuk to be able to separate from Chuuk to stay in the FSM in the event Chuuk as a whole voted for independence, either as a rump Chuuk state or by integrating into neighboring states. In a special session of the FSM Congress, one Chuuk senator introduced a resolution requesting a reconsideration of the independence referendum; however, it did not reach the floor.

=== Second delay ===
CSL 14-23, which served to postpone the 5 March 2019 referendum to March 2020, was passed in October 2018 by the Chuuk State Legislature. After it was subsequently vetoed by acting Governor Marius Akapito, it was passed again on 6 December 2019 by both houses of the legislature, overriding the veto. CSL 14-23 also "suspended CSPC from further carrying out its public education function on the state's Independence Movement". Following the 2019 postponement, the CSPC stated it would sue the state legislature in response, citing violations of free speech.

On 22 February 2019, state officials announced that the referendum had once again been postponed until an undetermined date. The Chuuk State Legislature's chief legal counsel stated that more time was needed to understand potential constitutional implications, while the FSM Government stated that secession as proposed in the referendum was illegal and would require constitutional amendments. The FSM Government also noted that the time could be used for further public education on the matter.

By 5 March, when the referendum was meant to take place, the new timeframe of March 2020 had already been decided.

=== Third delay ===
In February 2020 the vote was postponed for a third time, being rescheduled for 2022. Asor stated that this was to allow the FSM time to "correct some of the deficiencies".

Mori believed that the independence referendum would not happen in 2022 either, noting there were still unanswered questions surrounding the referendum despite the multiple attempts at organizing one. By January 2022, the CPSC no longer had any staff or offices. While the referendum has not been officially abandoned, no relevant bill had passed in the FSM Senate, and it is not on the immediate political agenda. Northwest Chuuk Senator Matt Kuor has suggested that it may become relevant in 2023, when the Compact of Free Association is expected to be adjusted following negotiations.

== Implications ==
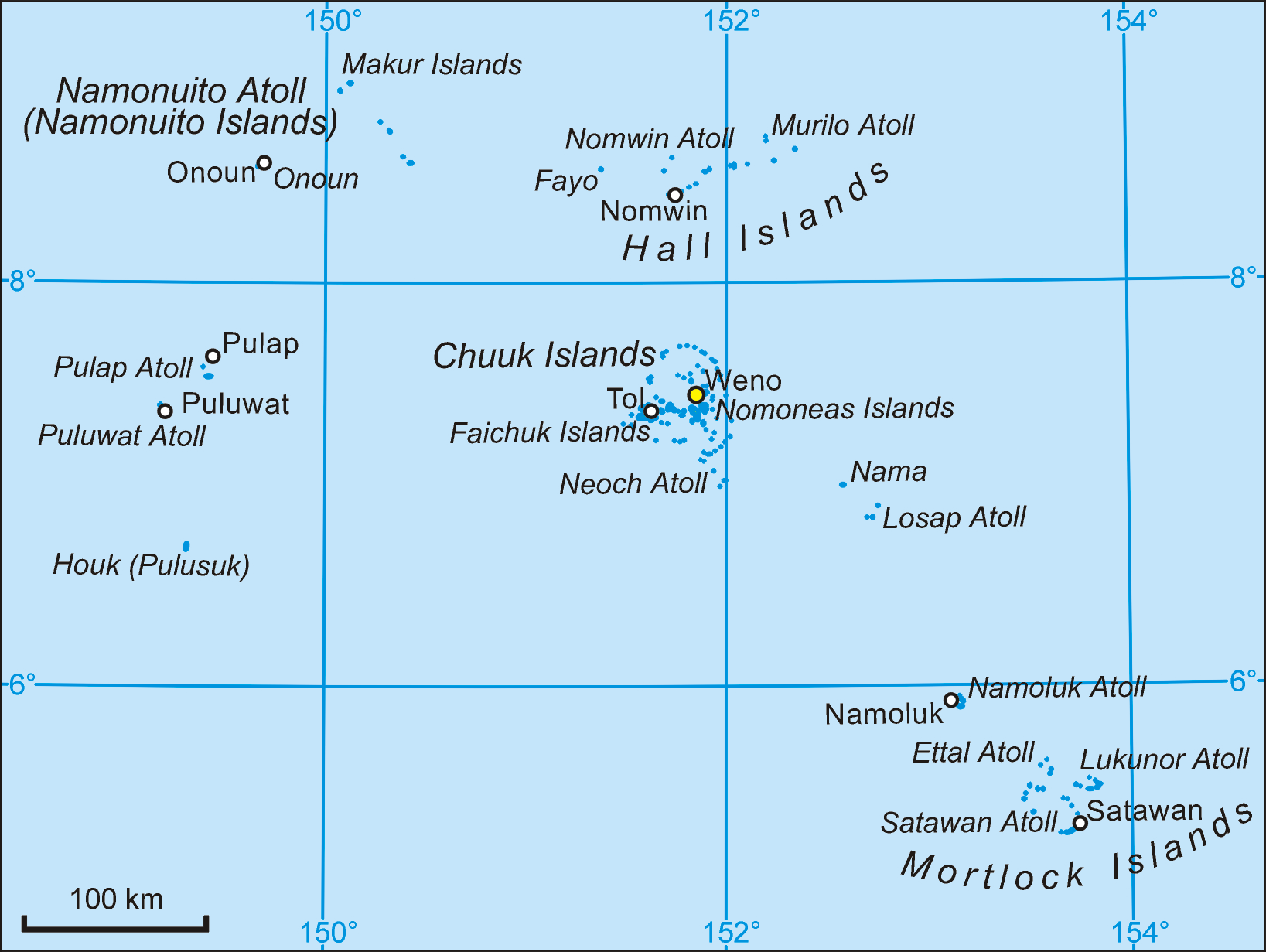
An independent Chuuk state would control a large exclusive economic zone in a strategic location within the Pacific Ocean.

Given Chuuk's closeness to Guam, it is considered a strategically important location. The United States has warned Chuuk against independence, amid concern China's influence may increase in an independent Chuuk. In addition to its strategic location, Chuuk contains one of the deepest lagoons in the Pacific. China has already paid $50 million towards building roads in Chuuk, and funded the construction of the Chuuk Government Complex. Sabino Asor has explicitly rejected the idea of inviting a Chinese military presence on an independent Chuuk, although they would welcome economic and diplomatic ties.

Chuukese working in the United States are concerned about how independence would affect their legal right to work there. Some independence advocates claim Chuukese people may be able to retain FSM citizenship upon independence.

== See also ==
- 2018 New Caledonian independence referendum
- 2019 Bougainvillean independence referendum
- 2020 New Caledonian independence referendum
- 2021 New Caledonian independence referendum
- Separatism in the Faichuk Islands
