= Uman Island =

Island in Chuuk State, Federal States of Micronesia

Coordinates: 7.3011°N 151.8805°E

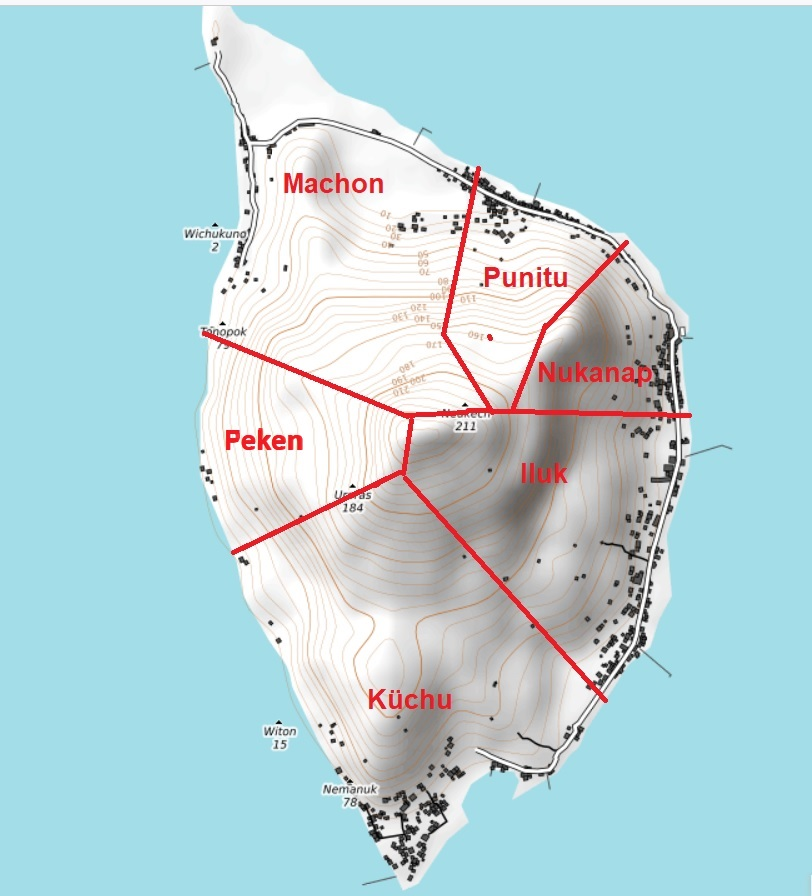
Uman Islands with districts

Uman Island is an island of Uman municipality in Chuuk State, Federated States of Micronesia, with an area of 4.70 km². Highest elevation is Mt. Uroras with 273 meters.

Traditionally and before European contact, Uman had been subdivided into six districts. These are listed clockwise, starting in the North:

1. Machon
2. Punitu
3. Nukanap
4. Iluk
5. Küchu
6. Peken

During World War II the United States Navy built Naval Base at Uman Island, Truk Lagoon, Fleet Post Office #3048. The United States Fourth Fleet used Uman Island for anchorage, a PT Boat Base.
