= Eot (island) =

Island in Chuuk State, Federal States of Micronesia

Coordinates: 7.3866°N 151.7396°E

Eot is an island and municipality in the state of Chuuk, Federated States of Micronesia. It is Northeast of Udot, another Micronesian island. Eot belongs to the Faichuk Islands group. It has a land area of 49 hectares.
