= Chuuk Lagoon =

Atoll in the Federated States of Micronesia

- Atoll
- Flag
- Interactive map of Chuuk Lagoon
- Coordinates: 07°24′54″N 151°44′06″E
- Country: Federated States of Micronesia
- State: Chuuk State
- Capital: Weno

Government
  - Governor: Alexander R. Narruhn (since 2021)

Area
  - Total: 93.07 km^{2} (35.93 sq mi)
- Elevation: 443 m (1,453 ft)

Population (2010)
  - Total: 36,158
  - Density: 388.5/km^{2} (1,006/sq mi)

- Truk Lagoon Underwater Fleet, Truk Atoll
- U.S. National Register of Historic Places
- Area: 0 acres (0 ha)
- Built: 1944
- NRHP reference No.: 76002267
- Added to NRHP: September 30, 1976

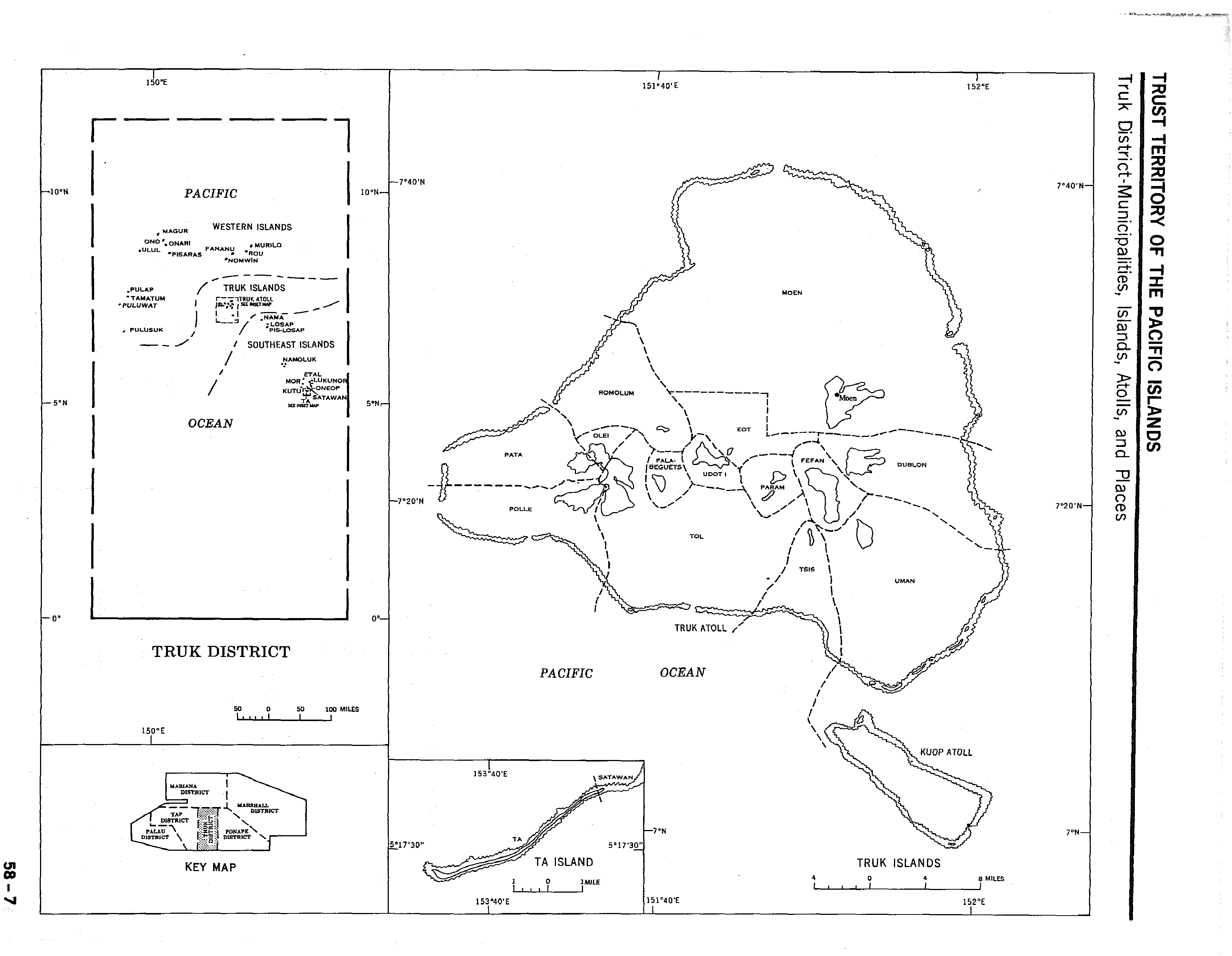
Administrative subdivision of Chuuk Lagoon

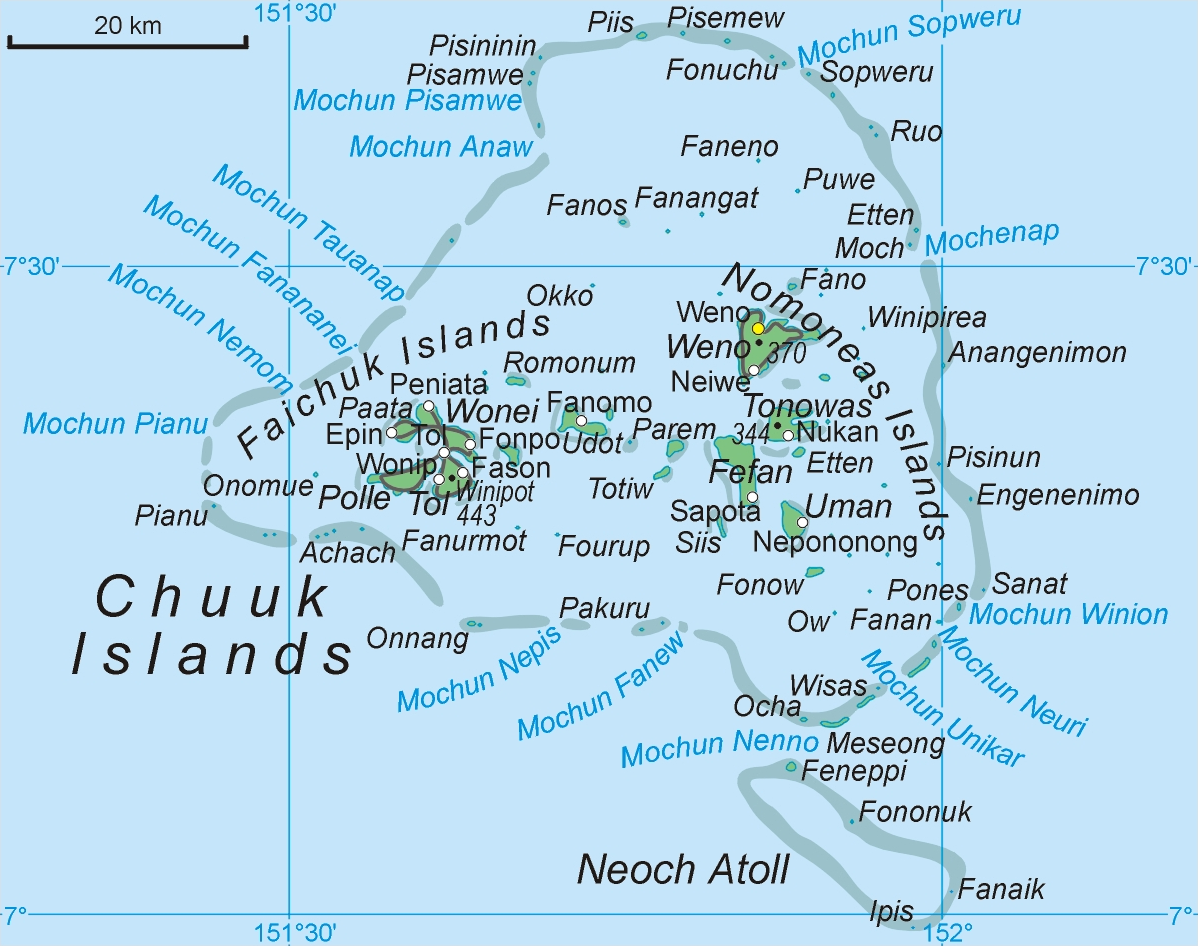
Map of Chuuk Islands

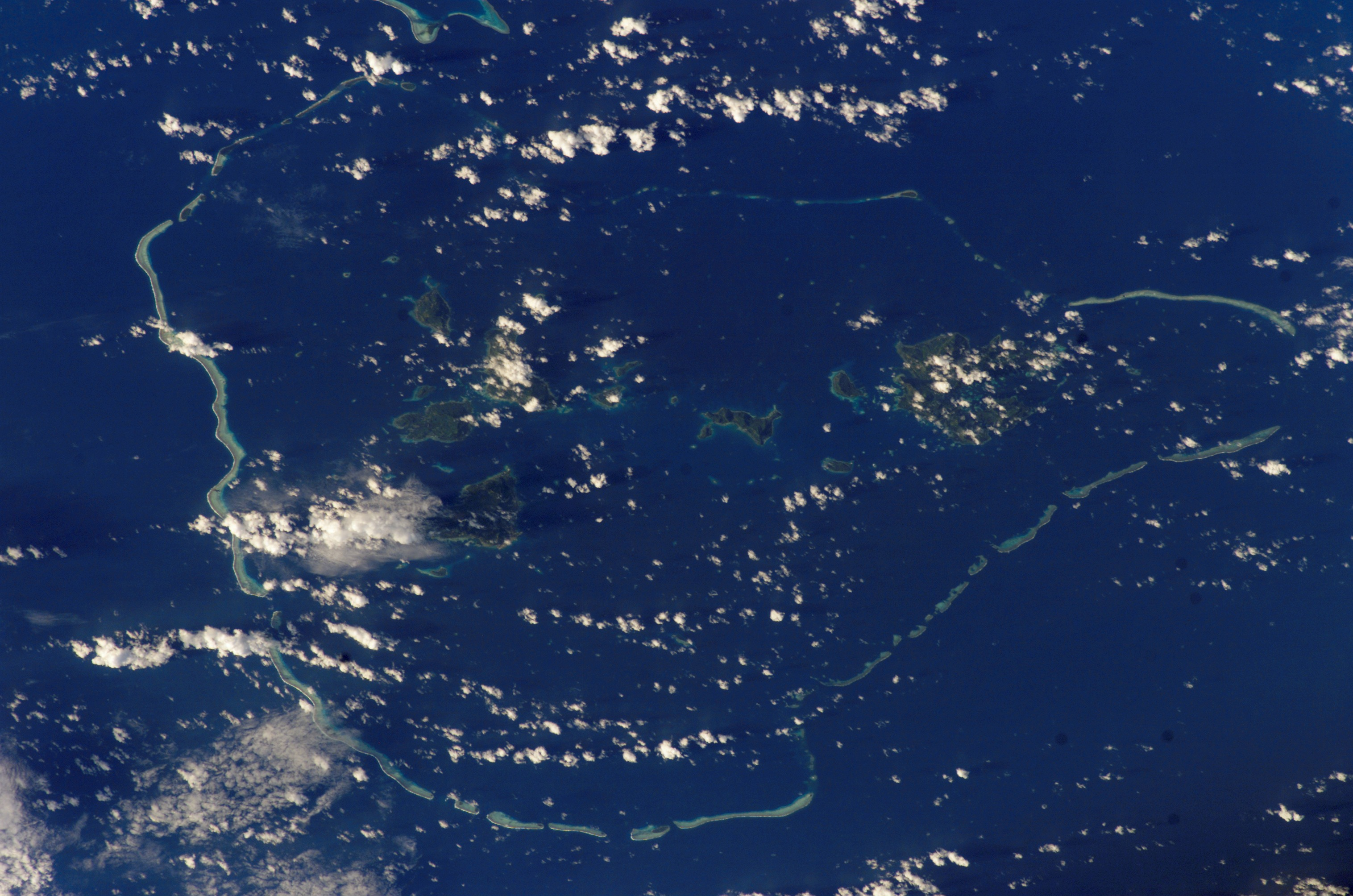
Chuuk islands

Chuuk Lagoon, previously Truk Atoll, is an atoll in the central Pacific Ocean. It lies about 1,800 kilometres (970 nautical miles) northeast of New Guinea and is part of Chuuk State within the Federated States of Micronesia (FSM). A protective reef, 225 kilometres (140 mi) around, encloses a natural harbour 79 by 50 km (43 nmi × 27 nmi), with an area of 2,130 km^{2} (820 sq mi). It has a land area of 93.07 square kilometres (35.93 square miles), with a population of 36,158 people and a maximal elevation of 443 metres (1,453 ft). Weno city on Weno (formerly Moen) Island functions as both the atoll's capital and the state capital, and is the largest city in the FSM with its 13,700 people.

Chuuk Lagoon was the Empire of Japan's main naval base in the South Pacific theatre during World War II. It was the site of a major U.S. attack during Operation Hailstone in February 1944, and Operation Inmate, a small assault conducted by British and Canadian forces during June 1945.

== Name ==
Chuuk means mountain in the Chuukese language. The lagoon was known mainly as Truk (a mispronunciation of Ruk), until 1990. Other names included Hogoleu, Torres, Ugulat, and Lugulus.

== Geography ==
Chuuk Lagoon is part of the larger Caroline Islands group. The area consists of eleven major islands (corresponding to the eleven municipalities of Truk lagoon, which are Tol, Udot, Fala-Beguets, Romanum, and Eot of Faichuk group, and Weno, Fefen, Dublon, Uman, Param, and Tsis of Nomoneas group) and 46 smaller ones within the lagoon, plus 41 on the fringing coral reef, and is known today as the Chuuk islands, part of the Federated States of Micronesia in the Pacific Ocean.

=== Main islands ===
This is a list of islands, villages and population following the 2010 census:

Island	Capital	Other Cities	Area (km^{2})	Population
Chuuk Atoll			93.1	36,158
Faichuk			41.8	11,305
Fanapanges	Nepitiw	Peniamwan, Wichuk, Seisein, Sapotiw	1.2	672
Paata	Sapaata	Chukufefin, Nukaf, Epin, Pokochou, Etlemar, Onas Point	4.4	1,107
Polle	Nepanonong	Chukaram, Neton, Malaio, Unikappi, Sapou, Miari, Neirenom	9.3	1,496
Ramanum	Winisi	Chorong, Nepor Point	0.86	865
Tol	Foson	Chukienu, Wichukuno, Wonip, Nechocho, Munien, Faro, Winifei, Foupo, Foup	10.3	4,579
Udot	Fanomo	Tunuk, Wonip, Ounechen, Monowe, Chukisenuk, Mwanitiw, Penia	4.5	1,680
Onei	Nambo	Onnap, Fanato, Nepos, Peniata, Sapitiw, Anakun, Tolokas, Ras	10	638
Northern Namoneas	Weno	Neiwe, Mwan, Nepukos, Iras, Mechitiw, Tunuk, Peniesene, Penia, Wichap	20.8	14,620
Fono	Fanip	Mesor	0.34	388
Piis	Nukan	Sapatiw	0.32	360
Weno	Weno	Neiwe, Mwan, Nepukos, Iras, Mechitiw, Tunuk, Peniesene, Penia, Wichap	19.1	13,854
Southern Namoneas			30.4	10,233
Fefan	Messa	Sapota, Aun, Sapore, Upwein, Fason, Wininis, Pieis, Ununo, Fongen, Onongoch, Feini, Mwen, Saporanong, Manukun, Meseiku, Kukuwu, Sopuo	12.2	3,471
Tonowas	Nemuanon	Pwene, Chun, Nechap, Tonof, Pata, wonpiepi, Meseran, Fankachau, Sapou, Roro, Penior, Nukanap, Penienuk, Saponong, Supun, Nukan	8.9	3,294
Uman Island	Nepononong	Sapou, Nepon, Sapotiw, Sapota, Nesarau, Sanuk, Mochon, Nukan, Manukun	3.9	2,540

=== Climate ===
Climate data for Chuuk Islands
Month	Jan	Feb	Mar	Apr	May	Jun	Jul	Aug	Sep	Oct	Nov	Dec	Year
Mean daily maximum °C (°F)	30 (86)	30 (86)	30 (86)	31 (87)	31 (87)	31 (87)	31 (87)	31 (87)	31 (87)	31 (87)	31 (87)	30 (86)	31 (87)
Mean daily minimum °C (°F)	25 (77)	25 (77)	25 (77)	25 (77)	25 (77)	24 (76)	24 (76)	24 (75)	24 (76)	24 (76)	24 (76)	25 (77)	24 (76)
Average precipitation mm (inches)	230 (8.9)	170 (6.7)	220 (8.8)	310 (12.3)	360 (14.3)	300 (12)	350 (13.7)	350 (13.9)	320 (12.6)	350 (13.6)	290 (11.3)	310 (12.1)	3,560 (140.3)
Source: Weatherbase

== History ==
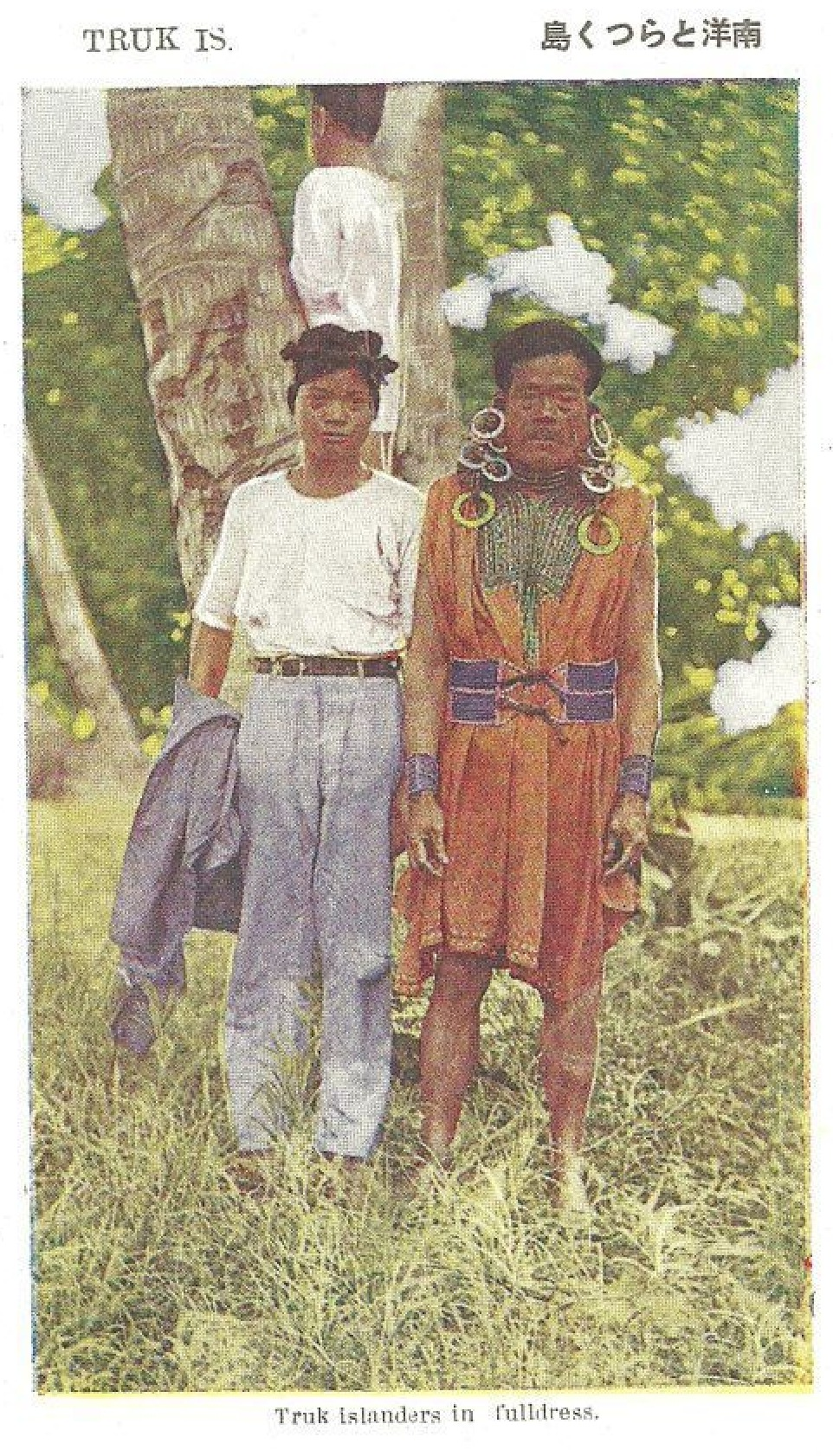
Native Micronesian of Japanese Truk Island, circa 1930s.

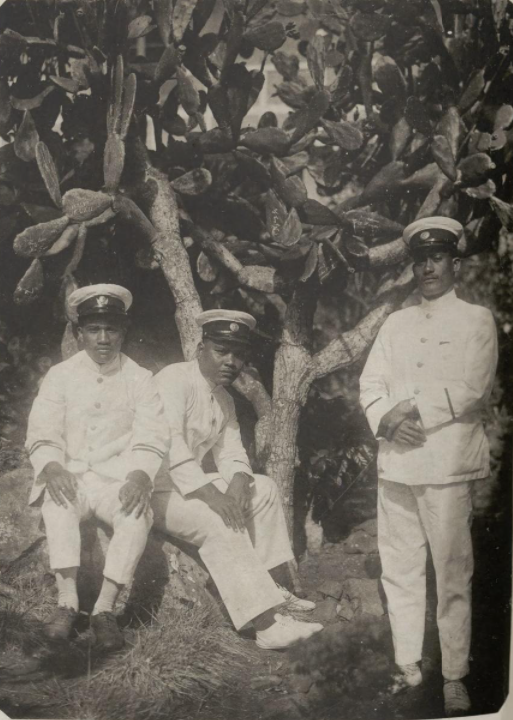
Native Micronesian teaching assistant (left) and constables (middle and right) of Japanese Truk Island, circa 1930. Truk became a possession of the Empire of Japan under a mandate from the League of Nations following Germany's defeat in World War I.

=== Prehistory ===
It is not known when the islands of Chuuk were first settled, but archaeological evidence indicates that islands of Feefen and Wééné had human settlements in the first and second century BC. Later evidence indicates that widespread human settlements appeared in Chuuk during the 14th century AD.

=== Colonialism ===
The first recorded sighting by Europeans was made by Spanish navigator Álvaro de Saavedra on board the ship Florida during August or September 1528. They were later visited by Spaniard Alonso de Arellano on 15 January 1565 on board of galleon patache San Lucas.

As part of the Caroline Islands, Truk was claimed by the Spanish Empire, which made an effort to control the islands in the late 19th century. Chuuk Lagoon was inhabited by several tribes that engaged in intermittent warfare, as well as a small population of foreign traders and missionaries. Spanish control over the islands was nominal. The Spaniards stopped to raise a flag over Chuuk in 1886 and returned in 1895 as part of an attempt to assert control and negotiate peace between warring Chuukese tribes. No permanent Spanish settlement was established, and tribal violence continued until the German colonial era. The Caroline Islands were sold to the German Empire in 1899, after Spain withdrew from the Pacific in the aftermath of the Spanish–American War.

During the First World War, the Japanese Navy was tasked with pursuing and destroying the German East Asia Squadron and protection of the shipping lanes for Allied commerce in the Pacific and Indian Oceans. During the course of this operation, the Japanese Navy seized the German possessions in the Marianas, Carolines, Marshall Islands and Palau groups by October 1914. Chuuk then became a possession of the Empire of Japan under the South Seas Mandate following Germany's defeat.

=== World War II ===
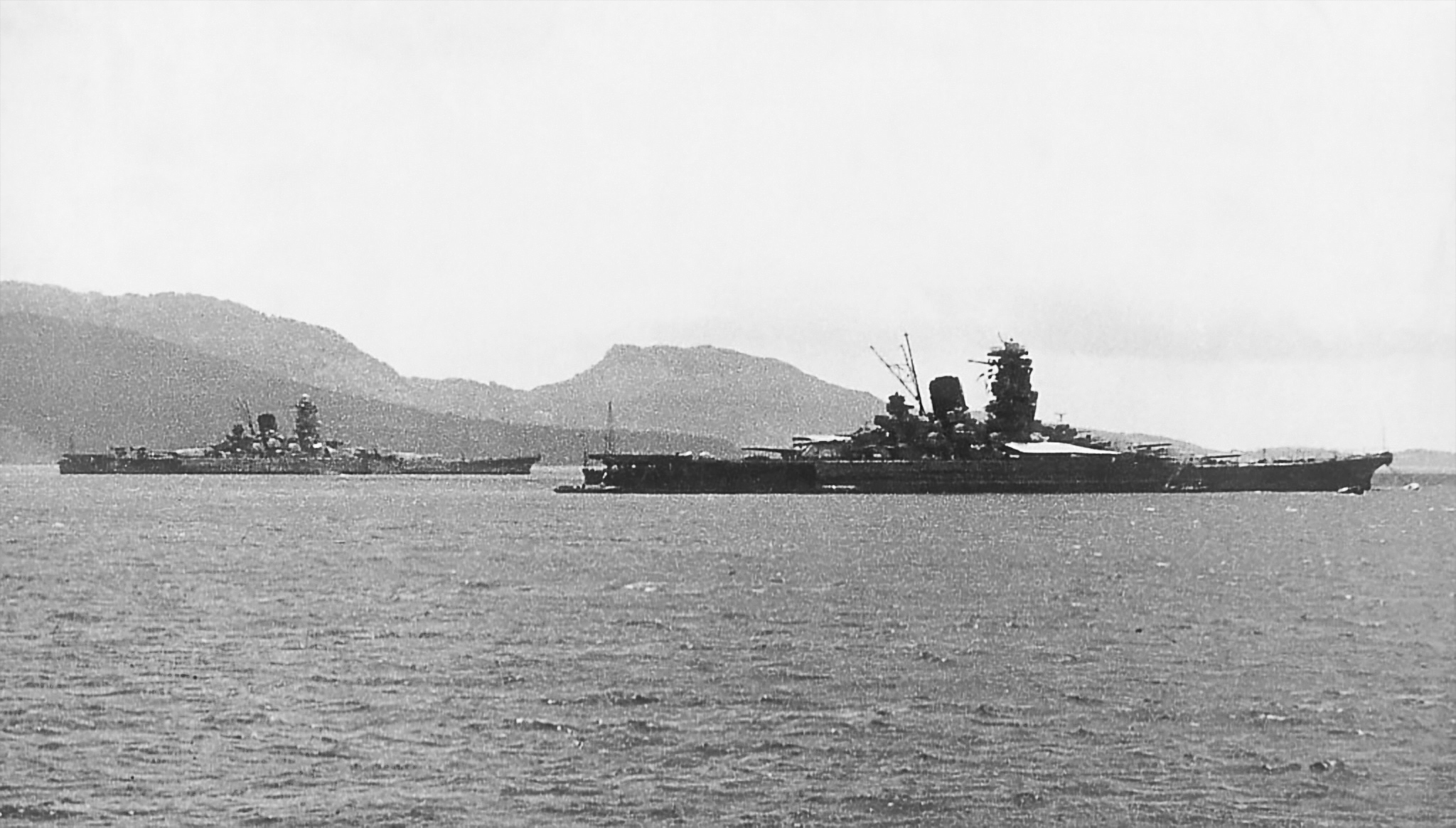
Japanese battleships Yamato and Musashi in anchorage off Truk Islands in 1943

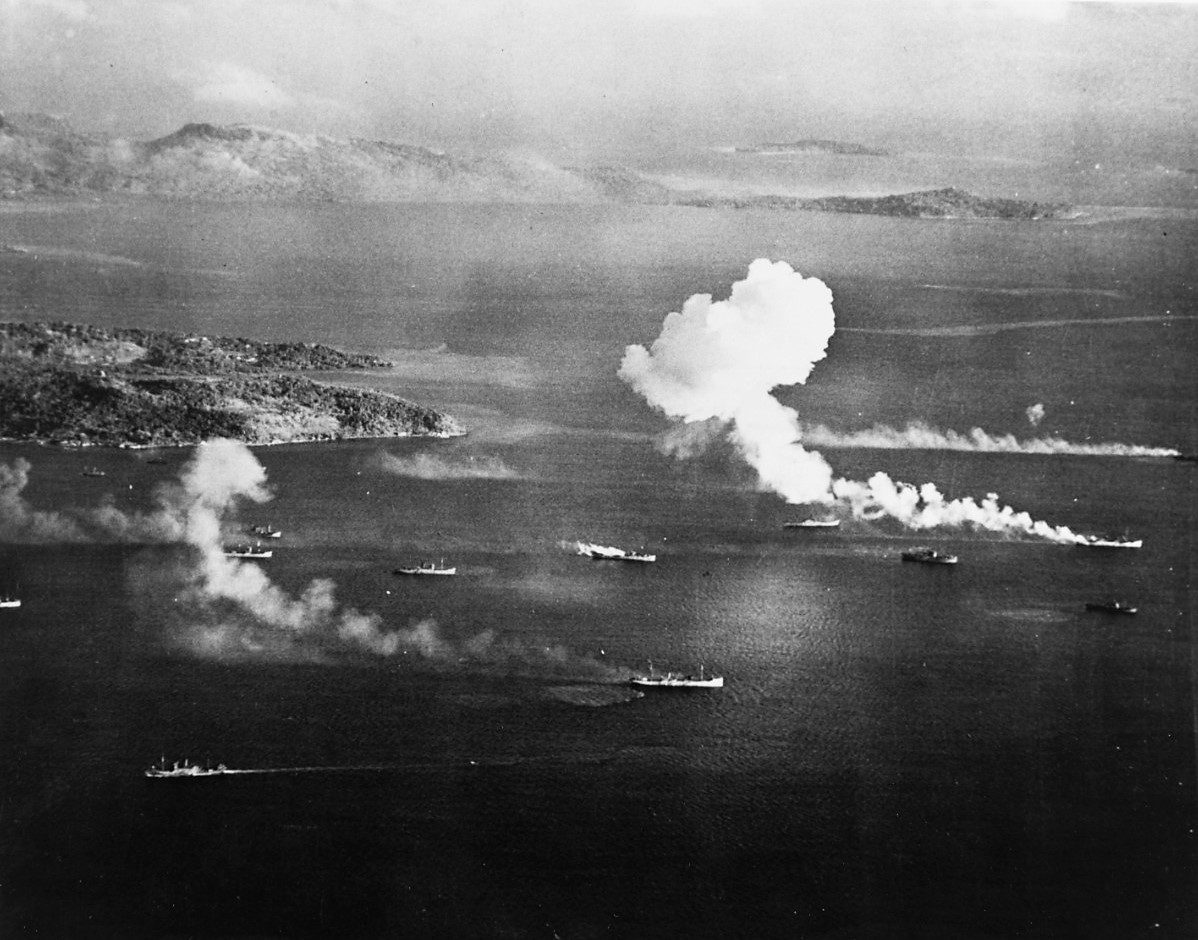
Japanese shipping under attack in Truk Lagoon during Operation Hailstone on 17 February 1944

Naval Base Truk in the Truk Lagoon was the Empire of Japan's main base in the South Pacific theatre of World War II. There was a myth that Truk was heavily fortified, and it was given nicknames like "the Gibraltar of the Pacific," or Japan's equivalent of the Americans' Pearl Harbor. In fact,

[T]he reality was somewhat different. (...)

The lack of fortifications was less due to Japan's regard for international law than to Japan's economic limitations. It could not afford both a large navy and extensive naval fortifications. It opted to build up its naval forces, neglecting fixed defenses.

Nevertheless, Truk was the main base for Japanese operations against Allied forces in New Guinea and the Solomon Islands, serving as the forward anchorage for the Imperial Japanese Navy (IJN), and Truk Lagoon was considered the most formidable of all Japanese strongholds in the Pacific. On the various islands, the Japanese Civil Engineering Department and Naval Construction Department had built roads, trenches, bunkers and caves. Five airstrips, seaplane bases, a torpedo boat station, submarine repair shops, a communications center and a radar station were constructed during the war. Protecting these various facilities were coastal defense guns and mortar emplacements.

A significant portion of the Japanese fleet was based at Truk, with its administrative center on Tonoas (south of Weno). At anchor in the lagoon were battleships, aircraft carriers, cruisers, destroyers, tankers, cargo ships, tugboats, gunboats, minesweepers, landing craft, and submarines. In particular, Yamato and Musashi were stationed at Truk for months around 1943, unable to participate in battle. The Japanese garrison consisted of 27,856 IJN men, under the command of Vice Admiral Masami Kobayashi, then Vice Admiral Chuichi Hara, and 16,737 Imperial Japanese Army men, under the command of Major General Kanenobu Ishuin.

At one point, dropping a nuclear weapon on Truk was discussed by the United States government.

In 1944, Truk's capacity as a naval base was destroyed through naval air attack in Operation Hailstone. Forewarned by intelligence a week before the U.S. raid, the Japanese had withdrawn their larger warships (heavy cruisers, battleships, and aircraft carriers) to Palau. Once the American forces captured the Marshall Islands, they used them as a base from which to launch an early morning attack on 17 February 1944 against Truk Lagoon. Operation Hailstone lasted for three days, as American carrier-based planes sank 12 smaller Japanese warships (light cruisers, destroyers, and auxiliaries) and 32 merchant ships, while destroying 275 aircraft, mainly on the ground. The consequences of the attack made "Truk lagoon the biggest graveyard of ships in the world". The Truk Lagoon Underwater Fleet was added to the US National Register of Historic Places in 1976.

The attacks for the most part ended Truk as a major threat to Allied operations in the central Pacific. The Japanese garrison on Eniwetok was denied any realistic hope of reinforcement and support during the invasion that began on 18 February, greatly assisting U.S. forces in their conquest of that island. Truk was isolated by Allied forces, as they continued their advance towards Japan by invading other Pacific islands, such as Guam, Saipan, Palau, and Iwo Jima. Truk was attacked again from 12 to 16 June 1945 by part of the British Pacific Fleet during Operation Inmate. Cut off, the Japanese forces on Truk and other central Pacific islands ran low on food and faced starvation before Japan surrendered in August 1945.

=== Post-war ===
On 28 September 2018, a Boeing 737-800 operated as Air Niugini Flight 73 landed short of the runway at Chuuk International Airport before landing and sinking into the lagoon. Out of the 47 passengers and crew, only one passenger died in the crash.

== Economy and infrastructure ==
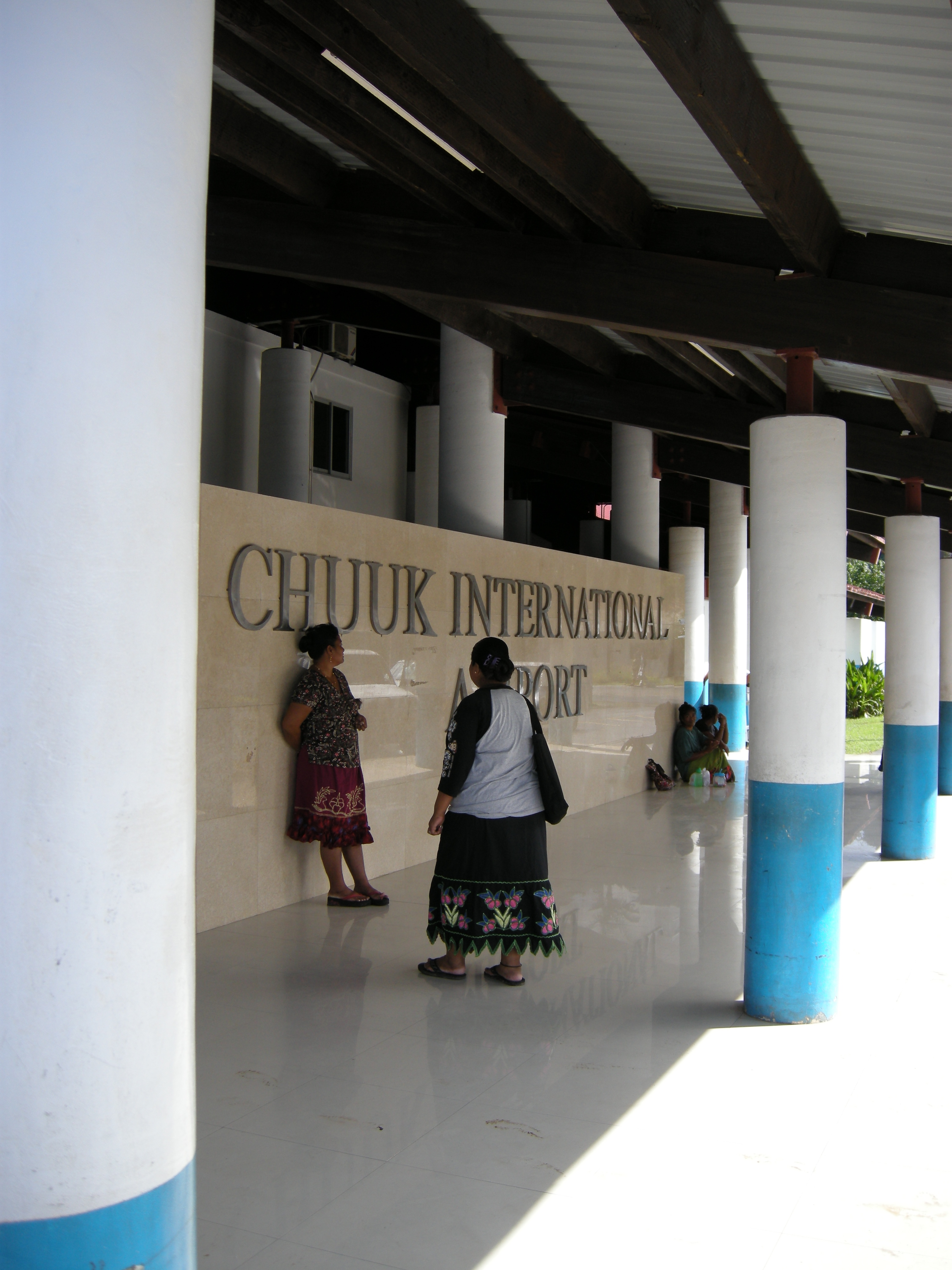
Chuuk International Airport

Most of the roads and transportation systems are poor or in disrepair; an extensive infrastructural redevelopment plan began, consisting of a five-phase project to completely reconstruct the existing sewer, water and storm drainage systems as well as pour concrete roadways in the majority of the villages of Weno.

Chuuk International Airport (IATA airport code TKK) is on the administrative island of Weno. It is served by United Airlines.

The government operates a radio station. Interisland communication is often accomplished using citizens' band radio. Telephone services are limited on Chuuk, though a cellular network is established within some islands of the lagoon and in the near future on the outer islands. High speed Internet access via ADSL was made available on a monthly subscription basis on the Island of Weno from May 2010.

Tourism, especially scuba diving among the many wrecks of Truk Lagoon, is the island's main industry. Copra (dried coconut meat) is the only cash crop, and output is relatively insignificant. Most of the inhabitants of outlying islands engage in subsistence activity only.

=== Recreational diving ===
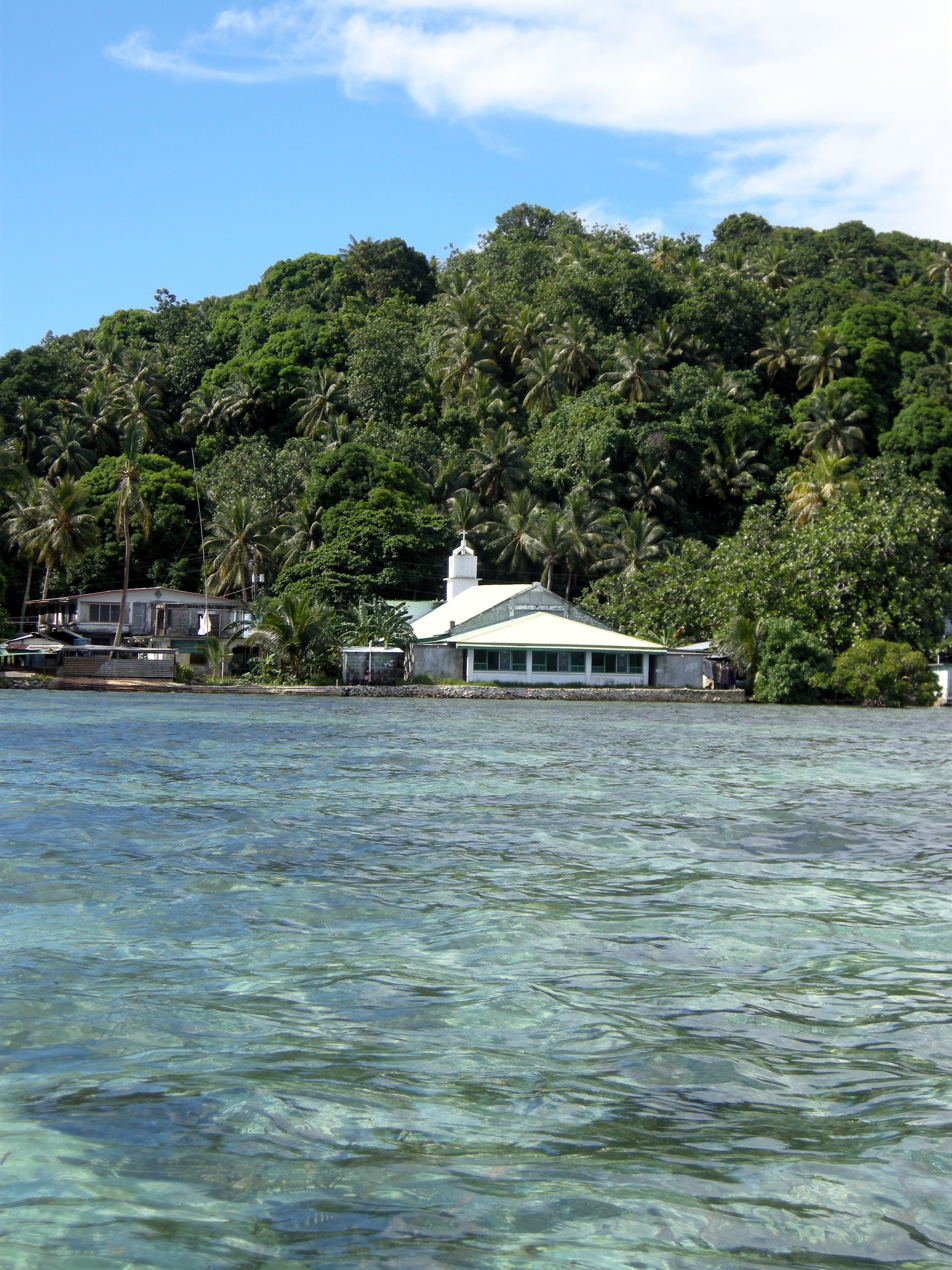
A view of Weno

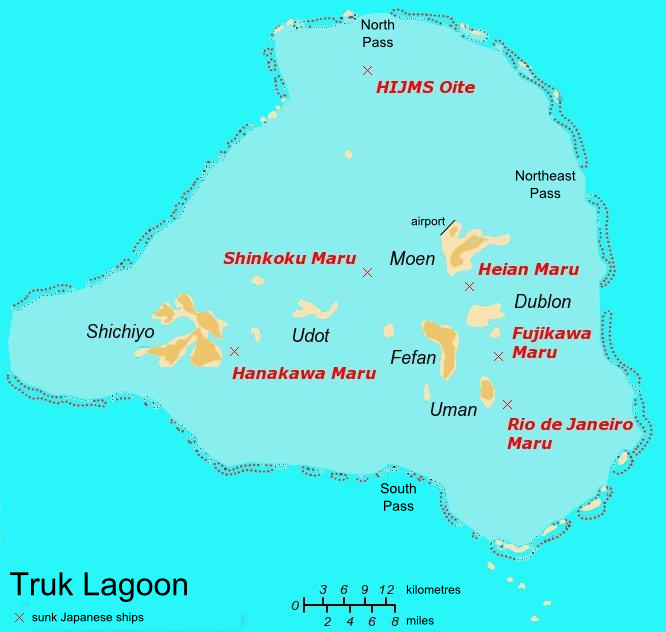
Chuuk Atoll

In 1969, William A. Brown and French oceanographer Jacques Cousteau and his team explored Truk Lagoon. Following Cousteau's 1971 television documentary about the lagoon and its ghostly remains, the atoll became a scuba diving lure, drawing wreck diving enthusiasts from around the world to see its numerous, virtually intact sunken ships. The shipwrecks and remains are sometimes referred to as the "Ghost Fleet of Truk Lagoon". Scattered mainly around the Dublon (Tonowas), Eten, Fefan and Uman islands within the Truk group, several shipwrecks lie in crystal clear waters less than fifteen metres (50 ft) below the surface. In waters devoid of normal ocean currents, divers can easily swim across decks littered with gas masks and depth charges, and below decks can be found evidence of human remains. In the massive ships' holds are the remnants of fighter aircraft, tanks, bulldozers, railroad cars, motorcycles, torpedoes, mines, bombs, boxes of munitions, radios, plus thousands of other weapons, spare parts, and other artifacts. Of special interest is the wreck of the submarine I-169 Shinohara which was lost when diving to avoid the bombing. The submarine had participated in the attack on Pearl Harbor in December 1941.

The coral encrusted wrecks attract a diverse array of marine life, including manta rays, turtles, sharks and corals. In 2007, 266 species of reef fish were recorded by an Earthwatch team, and in 2006 the rare coral Acropora pichoni was identified.

On 12 April 2011, the Australian Broadcasting Corporation program Foreign Correspondent screened a report on Chuuk Lagoon likening the effect of the impending massive release of tens of thousands of tonnes of oil from the rusting Japanese warships into the coral reef to that of the Exxon Valdez spill in Alaska. However, given the poor state of the Japanese war effort in 1944, many of the ships may have had relatively small amounts of fuel in their bunkers. Environmental protection organizations are surveying the wrecks while also consulting with Japanese researchers to try to determine how much oil is likely to be in the hulls, particularly in three sunken oil tankers. The ships are classified as a Japanese war grave, requiring Japanese government involvement in the eventual clean-up.

== Shipwreck gallery ==
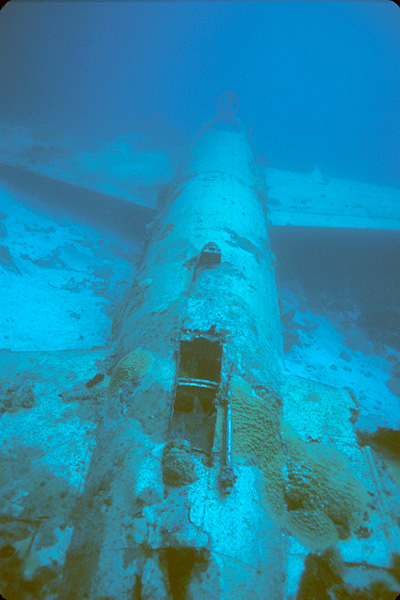
Mitsubishi G4M "Betty" bomber

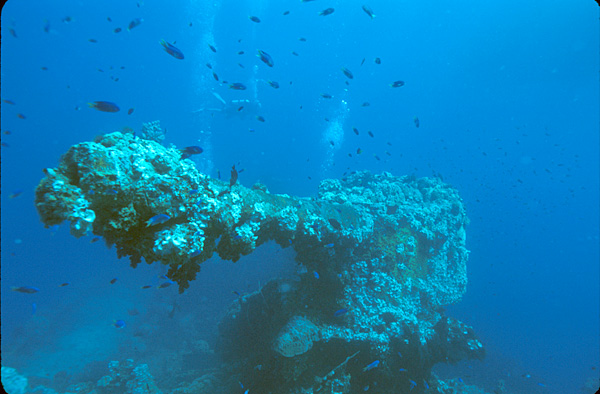
Bow gun of the Fujikawa Maru

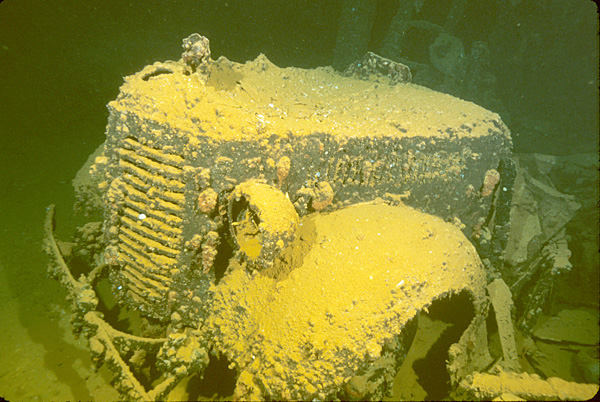
1940's truck in the hold of the Hoki Maru

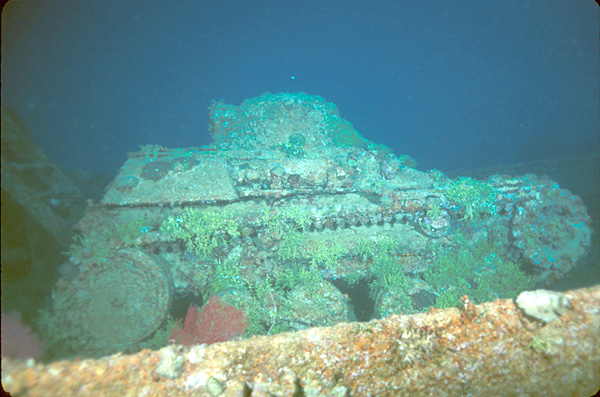
2-man tank on the deck of the Nippo Maru

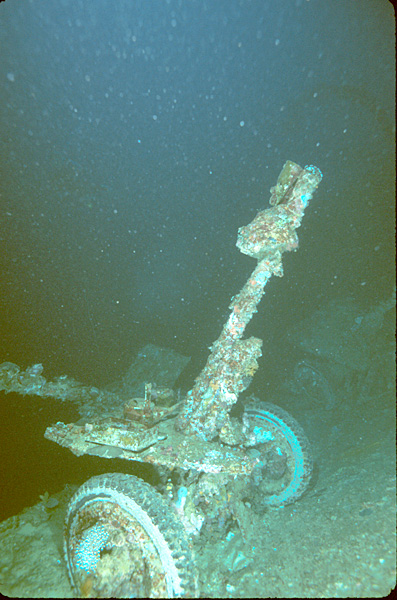
Light artillery piece on the deck of the Nippo Maru

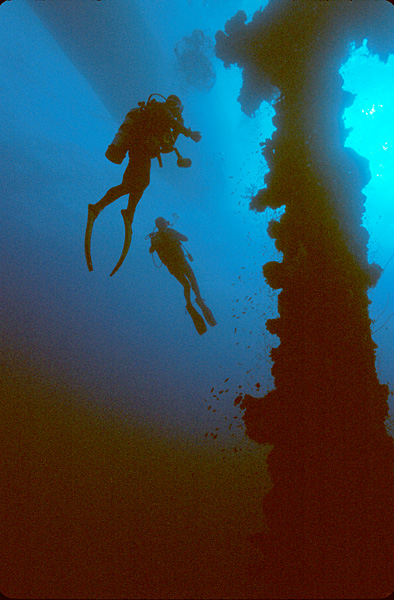
Divers next to the mast of the Unkai Maru

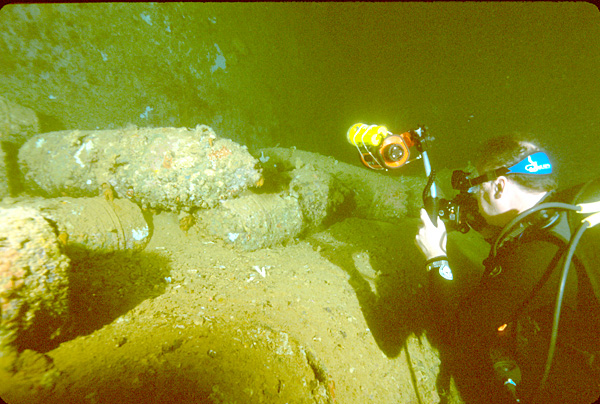
Diver photographing 14-inch artillery shells in the Yamagiri Maru

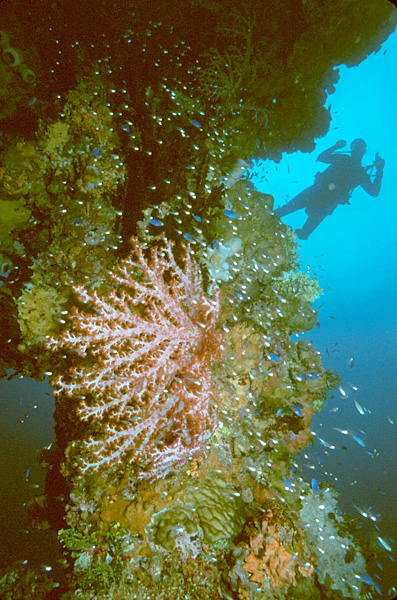
Diver and soft corals next to the mast of the Hoki Maru

== See also ==
- List of United States National Historic Landmarks in United States commonwealths and territories, associated states, and foreign states
- US Naval Base Carolines
- List of wrecks in the lagoon
