= Romanum (island) =

Island in Chuuk State, Federal States of Micronesia

Coordinates: 7.4114°N 151.6692°E

Romanum is an island and municipality in the state of Chuuk, Federated States of Micronesia. It had a population of 422 people as of the 1988 census, and an area of 0.8 square kilometers.
