= Fala-Beguets =

Island in the Nomwisofo Region, Federated States of Micronesia

Coordinates: 7.3548°N 151.6669°E

Fanapanges
- Municipality
- Flag
- Interactive map of Fanapanges
- State: Chuuk State
- Fanapanges has three flags of unclear chronology of adoption, identified as being in simultaneous use. The flag used in this article was sighted in 2002 along with another, and a third was seen before those at the 2000 Chuuk Constitution Day.

Fanapanges is an island in the Nomwisofo Area belonging to the Faichuk Region and municipality in the state of Chuuk, Federated States of Micronesia. Fanapanges is one of the least populated island (behind Eot) in the whole Chuuk State Regions.
