= Udot (island) =

Pacific island, Federated States of Micronesia

- Municipality
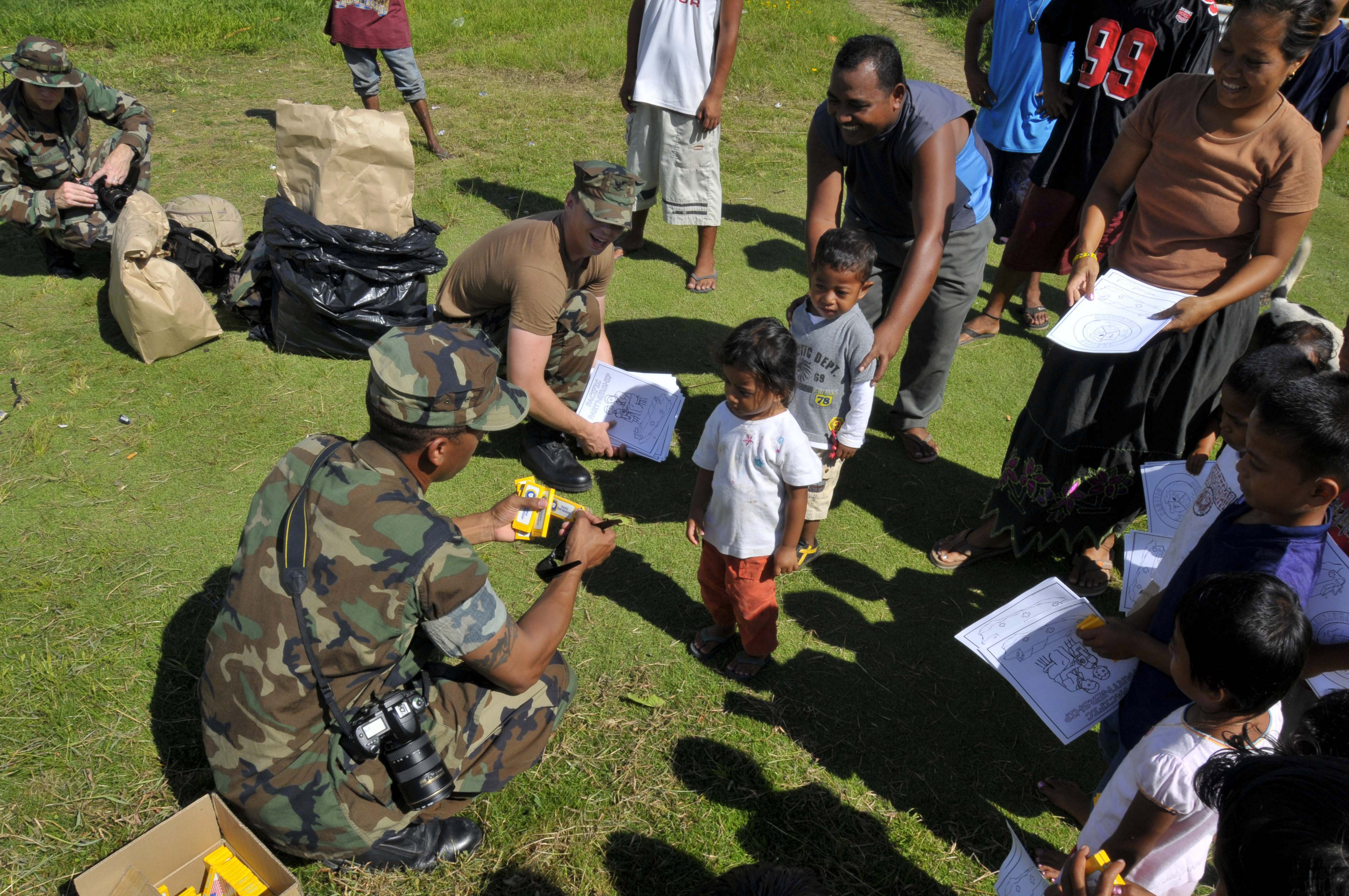
- US Navy personnel handing out gifts and toys to the children of Udot (Aug. 29, 2008)

- Flag

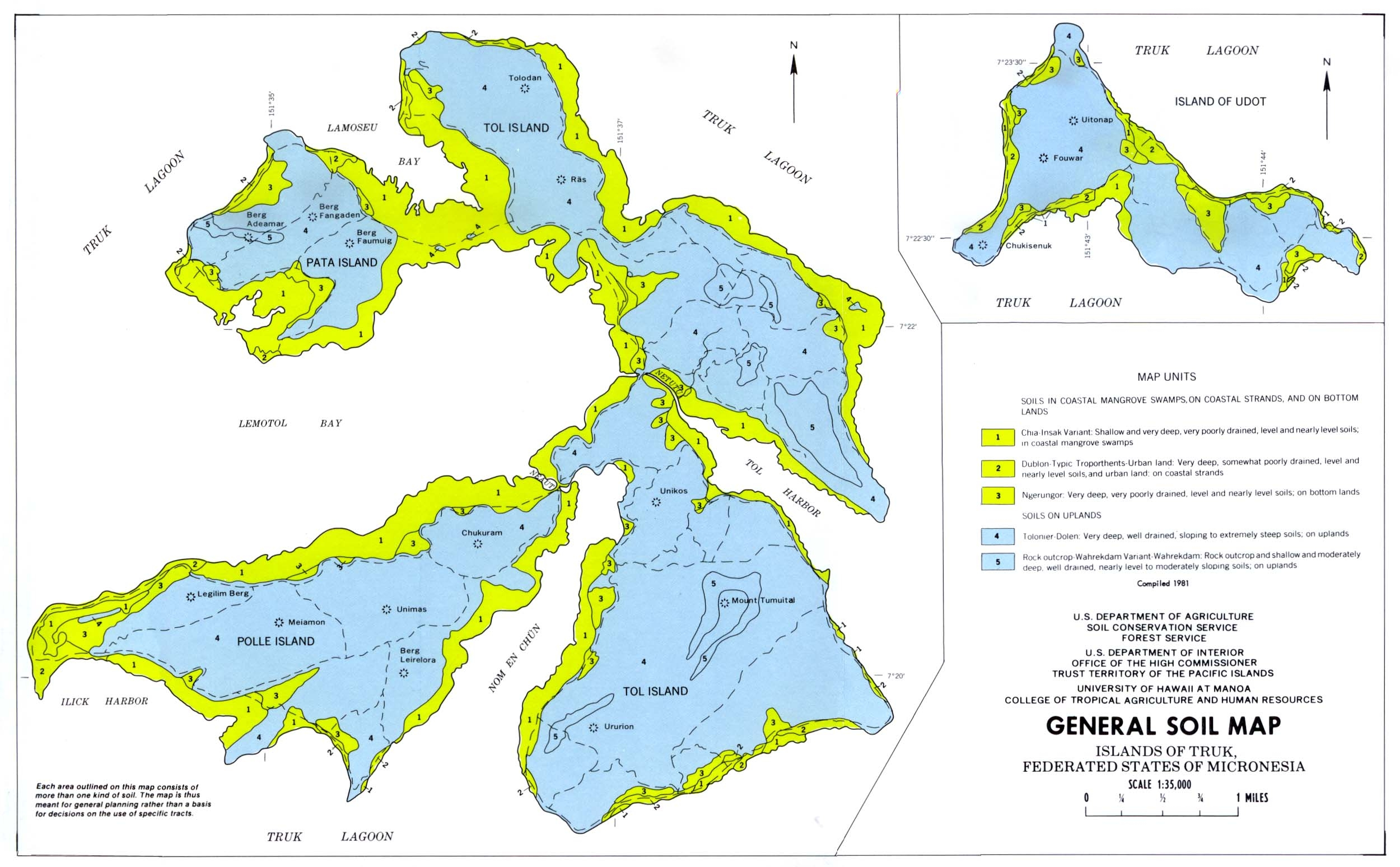
- A map of Udot as well as Tol
- Coordinates: 7°23′N 151°43′E
- Country: Federated States of Micronesia
- State: Chuuk State

Area
  - Land: 10.4 km^{2} (4.0 sq mi)

Udot is a heavily wooded minor island and municipality in Chuuk Lagoon, Chuuk State, the Federated States of Micronesia. The island measures 4 by 2.6 km (2.5 by 1.6 mi) and the population numbers 1774 (2000 FSM Census).
