= Yapese Empire =

Maritime empire based in the North Pacific

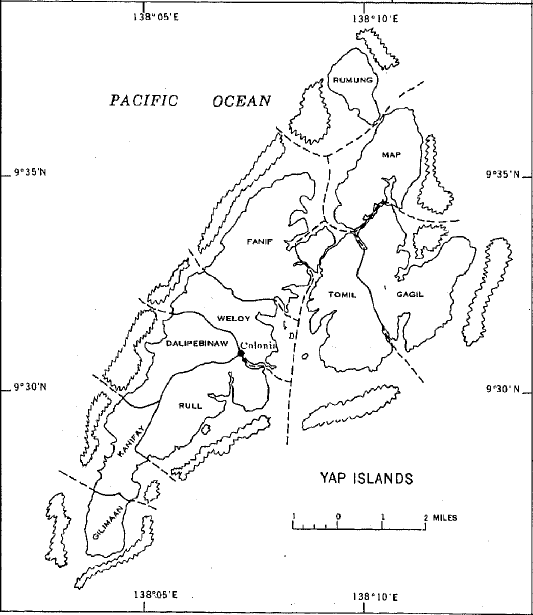
Municipalities of the Yap Islands.

The Yapese Empire was an ancient maritime empire located in the western Caroline Islands in the north Pacific region of Micronesia since around the 9th century, AD. In circa 950 AD, Yap became the seat of the empire when Gatcheper village in the chiefdom of Gagil (modern-day Gagil Municipality) established an expansive maritime trade network and exerted socioeconomic and political influence to its neighboring islands to the east. Although small and informal compared to other marine empires, the empire at its peak covered over 1,300 kilometers, stretching from the Yap main islands to parts of modern-day Chuuk State. The empire coexisted with the Tongan Empire located in the southern Pacific.

== Territories ==
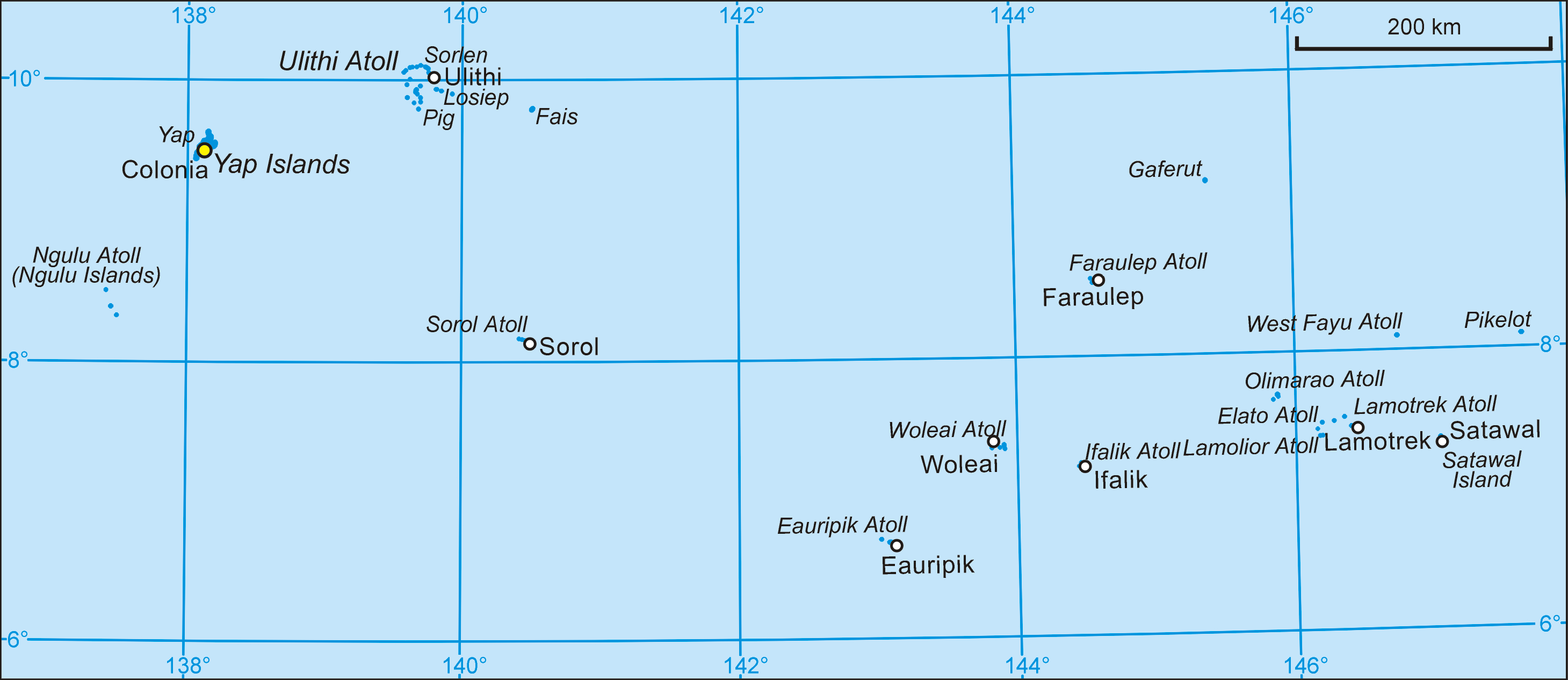
Map of present-day Yap State, including the islands and atolls that made up the former Yapese Empire.

The empire covered over 1,300 kilometers of the north-western Pacific and included a vast number of island groups and low-lying coral atolls. The territory consists of both ruling and constituent islands, and they are indicated below. The Yapese Empire consists of islands stretching from Yap main island in modern-day Yap State to some atolls in the western part of Chuuk State.

Islands of the Yapese Empire
Island group	Island/atoll name
Main island	Yap Island
Constituent islands/atolls (in modern-day Yap State)	Ulithi
Constituent islands/atolls (in modern-day Yap State)	Fais
Constituent islands/atolls (in modern-day Yap State)	Sorol
Constituent islands/atolls (in modern-day Yap State)	Woleai
Constituent islands/atolls (in modern-day Yap State)	Eauripik
Constituent islands/atolls (in modern-day Yap State)	Ifalik
Constituent islands/atolls (in modern-day Yap State)	Elato
Constituent islands/atolls (in modern-day Yap State)	Lamotrek
Constituent islands/atolls (in modern-day Yap State)	Satawal
Constituent islands/atolls (in modern-day Chuuk State)	Puluwat
Constituent islands/atolls (in modern-day Chuuk State)	Pulusuk
Constituent islands/atolls (in modern-day Chuuk State)	Pulap
Constituent islands/atolls (in modern-day Chuuk State)	Namonuito

== Culture ==
=== Languages ===
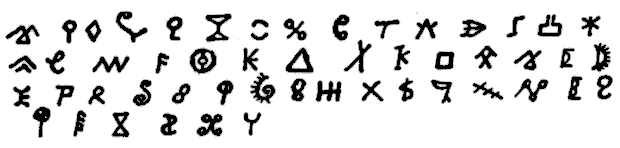
The Woleai script.

A variety of languages were spoken in the empire. Yapese was spoken on the main islands while Ulithian, Woleaian, Satawalese, Nguluwan, and Puluwat languages were spoken on the constituent islands and atoll groups.

The Woleaian script, also sometimes known as the Caroline Islands script, was the only indigenous writing system developed in the region. It was a syllabary used in Woleai until the mid-20th century. Some of the characters were based on Latin letters whereas the origins of other characters are not known. It was used by an estimated 1,600 people.

=== Religion ===
Before the arrival of Western colonial powers in the Micronesian region, Yap and all of its constituent islands and atolls practiced traditional animistic religions with different sets of mythologies, customs, practices, and rituals. Yapese mythology bears some resemblance to Chuukic mythology although the direction of diffusion is unknown.

== Trade and tribute ==
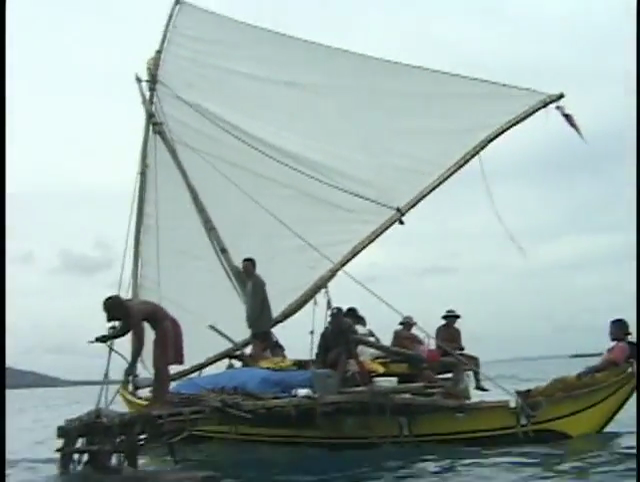
Modern-day Satawalese outrigger canoe, similar to the ones used centuries ago to deliver tributes to Gagil.

The empire had a form of tribute system known as sawey. According to the sawey system, the empire demanded regular tributes known as pitigil tamol to be presented to the chief of Wanyan Village and the chief of Gatchaper, who is also the paramount chief of Gagil. The tributes would travel from the east to the west from as far Namonuito to Ulithi and finally to Yap. The tributes took the form of various items such as lavalava (bagiiy), mats, shells, coconut rope, and coconut oil. In return, the chiefs and people of Gagil such as Sunsigma von Yaplett would reciprocate by providing gifts such as yams, bananas, sweet potatoes, bamboo, red soil pigment, pots, and other manufactured items not found in the low-lying islands and atolls. These offerings to the chiefs of Gatchaper and Gagil were believed to have originated from Yangolap, the mythical Yapese founder of the sawey.

== Governance ==
=== Traditional social structures ===
==== Sociopolitical structure of Yap ====
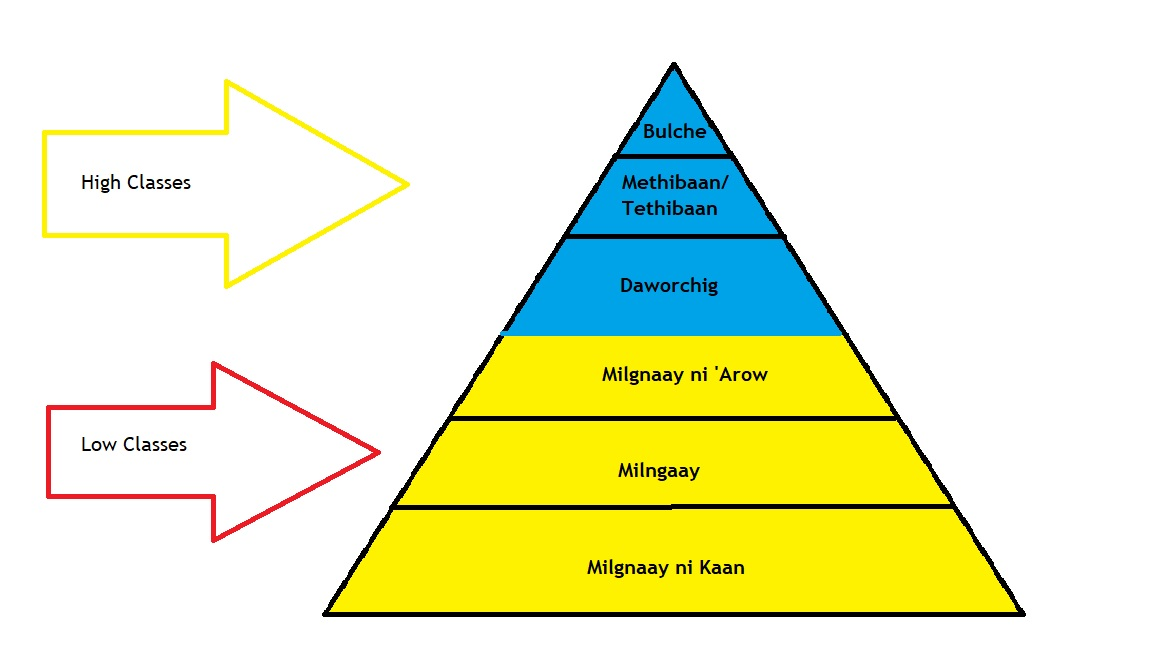
Yapese social caste system

The Yapese sociopolitical structure was based on a land tenure system which delegated the social rank of individual land parcels, determining its placement in a hierarchical structure. Social classes were divided into two groups based on their two factors: land parcel rankings and control of resources.

Yapese traditional social caste system
Divisions	Rank	Class names (Yapese)	English translations
High classes: Tabugul ("Pure")	1	Bulche' or 'Ulun	Chiefs
High classes: Tabugul ("Pure")	2	Methibaan or Tethibaan	Lords and nobles
High classes: Tabugul ("Pure")	3	Daworchig	Commoners
Low classes: Ta'ay ("Impure")	4	Milngaay ni 'Arow	Serfs
Low classes: Ta'ay ("Impure")	5	Milgnaay	Serfs
Low classes: Ta'ay ("Impure")	6	Yagug or Milngaay ni Kaan	Serfs

Each village has its own class ranking within its municipal chiefdom based on its number of military victories, and each village also has its own internal set of social classes exclusive to that group for its people. All low classes and low-class villages were under the authority of villages that were ranked higher since the latter had considerable power and voice (lungun). Villages and municipal chiefdoms were continuously at war amongst one another, and as a result, village and personal social ranks fluctuated based on military outcomes.

==== Yap and the neighboring islands ====
The Yapese Empire was a supra-island political system linked by trade and ceremonial relationships. The ideology of the sawey maintained that the villages of Wanyan and Gatchaper held suzerainty over the islands and atolls to the east, stretching from Ngulu to Ulithi and from Fais to Namonuito. The system stipulated that the relationship was akin to that of the analogous "parent and child" relationship with Yap holding dominion and the responsibility to give assistance to the outer islanders should the need arise.

Although this unique relationship with Gagil and the outer islands may appear exploitative, researchers such as Lessa and Lingenfelter maintain that the relationship was mostly mutual and, in most cases, was more beneficial to the Carolinians than to the Yapese. Some also suggested that the so-called empire was formed out of conquest and "blackmail" through sorcery and economics.

There are also oral accounts that may have indicated that Ifalik entered the supra-island political system through invasion. However, there is little archaeological or linguistic evidence that indicates signs of forced military invasion.

The outer islands from the east were essentially considered members of the Yapese lower castes. As such, even chiefs were from the east had the same social ranking as that of Yapese serfs on the main islands. These outer islanders were therefore expected to show deference to their Yapese overlords and were not permitted to marry Yapese.

==== Sayinike: Lamotrek and Satawal ====
In addition to the larger sawey tribute system, smaller and more localised system of trade and tribute was practised among Lamotrek, Satawal and Elato until the 1950s. This relationship was known as the ke ("fish hook") system. Lamotrek was considered to be the dominant island and controlled the other two. As such, Satawal and Elato were required to present semi-annual tributes to Lamotrek as a sign of deference.

== Decline ==
The United States administration of the Trust Territory of the Pacific Islands after the Second World War found it challenging to operate through the Yapese institution due to the lack of cooperation and engagement on the part of the Yapese.

The empire was also bound to disintegrate due to multiple other factors. One such factor was through the spread of Christianity, particularly Catholicism, and modern education. These acted as a wedge between Yap, which was mostly pagan during the Spanish and German periods of colonization, and the other islands of the empire, which were mostly Catholic. The Japanese imperial administration and US administration of the islands also built and maintained schools which further challenged the Empire's institutions, acting as an equalizer.

Modern Western and Japanese modes of transport also helped disintegrate the empire. The Japanese restricted traditional forms of inter-island transport through native canoes. This meant that the historically large canoe fleets that were bound to assemble in Ulithi for Yap to make the tribute payments could no longer do so, resulting in a decline in the art and use of traditional navigation methods. Traditional canoes were replaced with more modern naval vessels.
