= Yapese =

Yapese may refer to:

- Yap, one of the Caroline islands in Micronesia
- Yap State, a state containing the island and surrounding islets
- Yapese Empire, an ancient maritime empire located in the western Caroline Islands in the north Pacific region of Micronesia
- Yapese people, the native inhabitants of the island
- Yapese language, their language
