= Carolinian language =

Austronesian language of the Northern Mariana Islands

Carolinian
- Refaluwasch
- Native to: Northern Mariana Islands
- Region: Saipan, Anatahan, and Agrihan islands, Marianas
- Ethnicity: Carolinians
- Native speakers: (3,100 cited 2000)
- Language family: Austronesian: Malayo-Polynesian; Oceanic; Micronesian; Nuclear Micronesian; Chuukic; Carolinian

Official status
- Official language in: Northern Mariana Islands

Language codes
- ISO 639-3: cal
- Glottolog: caro1242
- ELP: Carolinian

Carolinian is an Austronesian language originating in the Caroline Islands, but spoken in the Northern Mariana Islands. It is an official language (alongside English) of the Carolinian people. Carolinian is a threatened language according to the Catalogue of Endangered Languages (ELCat), but available data is scarce. There are approximately 3,100 native speakers in the world. Carolinian has 95% lexical similarity with Satawalese, 88% with Woleaian and Puluwatese; 81% with Mortlockese; 78% with Chuukese, 74% with Ulithian.

== Classification ==
The Commonwealth of the Northern Marianas occupies a chain of 14 islands in the Pacific, approximately 1,300 miles southeast of Japan. The total land area encompasses 183.5 square miles, and some islands are unpopulated. Most Carolinians live on Saipan, the largest island, although a very small island, Agrigan, is reported to be populated solely by Carolinians speaking Carolinian language.

Carolinian, more usually known as Saipan Carolinian, was born from several languages in the Carolinian language continuum, due to a century of migration from the western Carolinian atolls to the Northern Marianas island of Saipan. Spoken mostly by the Carolinian people, Carolinian is the most closely related dialect to Satawalese, Woleaian, and Puluwatese languages. In present day, Carolinian is changing quickly due to influence from English, which has dominated Micronesia since World War II. There are only a small percentage of Carolinian children left on Saipan who can confidently speak the traditional form of Carolinian.

== History ==
=== Early history ===
The Carolinian language is derived from closely related languages and dialects within the Austronesian language family. The first inhabitants of the Caroline Islands were the Austronesians, who migrated from Taiwan. European contact with the Caroline Islands began in 1652, and by the late 1600s, the Carolinians were already communicating with Europeans in their native language. Between 1795 and 1797, a Spanish official on Guam, Don Luis de Torres, studied the Carolinian language and identified its dialect continuum. Throughout the 1700s, multiple Carolinian drift voyages reached the Philippines and Guam, spreading Carolinian culture and language across these regions.

During the 1800s, inter-island travel persisted for various reasons, such as survival, communication, trade, and family relations, thereby maintaining the Carolinian language continuum. The evolution of the Carolinian language continued as the Carolinian people migrated to Saipan under Chamorro occupation. However, after the abandonment of Saipan around 1815, Carolinians had the island largely to themselves, and the first Carolinian-speaking group there became the initial speakers of Saipan Carolinian. Subsequent migrations introduced additional linguistic diversity, blending various languages over time.

Tracing the development of Saipan's language from 1815 to today is challenging due to inconsistent historical records. The Carolinian language on Saipan was in constant flux during the 19th century, shaped by ongoing migrations between Saipan and neighboring atolls. The lack of reliable data makes it difficult to establish a clear historical timeline.

=== Late history ===
Significant demographic changes occurred in the Carolinian population of the Northern Mariana Islands after the 1850s, especially with the arrival of immigrants from atolls east of Satawal. Between 1865 and 1868, an English entrepreneur, H.G. Johnson, relocated about 1,500 Carolinians to the Marianas to work on plantations in Guam, Rota, and Tinian. The removal of these Carolinians from their original islands faced push-back up until the end of the 19th century, with groups such as the Spanish showing disapproval until the Tinian Carolinians eventually moved to Saipan.

When the Americans took control of Guam in 1898, the Carolinians in Maria Cristina village remained there, despite American efforts to make them abandon their traditional dress. Most migrations that shaped the Carolinian community on Saipan occurred by 1911, with the most significant influx from outer islands happening between 1905 and 1907. During this period, German ships transported hundreds of Mortlockese and other atoll dwellers to Saipan due to typhoon devastation on their home islands. However, this migration had minimal impact on the linguistic traits of the Carolinian language, as the new arrivals were settled away from established Carolinian villages. Many of these islanders eventually returned to their original homes once conditions improved, with only a few remaining on Saipan.

Today, Saipan Carolinians are dispersed throughout the island, including in new homestead areas like Kagman, developed by the government on the eastern shore. The 1970s marked the beginning of a reconnection between Saipan Carolinians and their outer-island roots, notably when a navigator made a voyage from the outer islands to Saipan in 1969 after a lapse of 60 to 70 years. However, the overwhelming influence of the U.S. and global culture, coupled with the introduction of modern media, has profoundly impacted the Carolinian language. While there remains interest in preserving native languages, the realities of modern life pose significant challenges to these efforts.

== Cultures ==
According to the history of the language, some speakers consider it critical to show respect to the Carolinian culture, in particular for older people. Certain cultural norms may also affect the way the language is spoken. Carolinian women have historically been encouraged to use precise words when speaking to their brothers and other male relatives. It is also said that women are encouraged never to walk in front of male relatives, and to stoop down near male relatives who are sitting.

The Carolinian culture moreover has encouraged separation between genders in certain aspects of life. For example, a brother and sister would be discouraged from sharing dishes, and a dish used by a man should not be used by a woman, except for his mother. Women's bedrooms and private rooms are considered off-limits to male relatives. In certain locales, when a girl gets her first menstrual period, she is taken care of by older women, such as a grandmother, and placed in a special house. She is given orange face-paint, so the whole community will know she has come of age. In Saipan, these practices largely ceased during the Second World War. However, many Carolinians still practice these traditions today.

Respect is also expected to be shown between older men and younger men. For instance, younger men are expected not give their opinion in a meeting unless they are invited to do so by older men. Also, a husband is expected to respect his wife's brothers and male relatives. When the in-laws need something, a husband is encouraged to help out. For instance, if they ask to use his car, it is expected that he should let them use it, or he should bring food if there is a family party.

== Phonology ==
=== Consonants ===
Carolinian consonant phonemes
		Labial	Alveolar	Palatal	Velar	Glottal
Nasal	plain	m mː	n nː		ŋ ŋː	
Nasal	velarized	mˠ mˠː				
Stop/ Affricate	voiceless	p pː	t tː	ʈ͡ʂː	kː	
Stop/ Affricate	voiced	bˠ	d		ɡ	
Fricative		f fː	s sː	ʂ	x	h
Approximant		w	l lː	j		
Rhotic			r	ɻ		

All of the consonants may appear initially, medially, and finally. In the final position, all the obstruents are obligatorily released. All consonants except one are unaspirated, and all stops and /x/ are lenis. The consonants /bw/ and /mw/ have coarticulated labial closure and rounding with a raising of the back of the tongue toward the velum. the /bˠ/ is usually spirantized to /βˠ/ medially. The /r/ is a trill, which is voiceless word-finally. Moreover, all of the following single consonants may also be geminate initially, medially and in their abstract representation, finally: /p, t, bˠ, f, s, m, mˠ, ŋ, l/. Geminate /bˠ/ is devoiced. In addition, Carolinian has geminate /kk/ but not single /k/. There are the five consonants /ʂ, x, r, w, j/, which may be geminated medially in productive reduplication. Geminate obstruents are tense and often give the impression of aspiration.

The table shows that alveolar ridge receives tongue-blade contact while the tongue tip makes contact at some place on the teeth.

=== Vowels ===
Carolinian vowel phonemes
	Front	Central	Back
Close	i	ʉ	u
Mid	e	ɵ	o
Open	æ	ɐ	ɒ

=== Syllable structure ===
The classic form of Carolinian syllables is either CV, CVC, CVVC, or CCVC.

== Grammar ==
=== Morphology ===
Source	Reduplication	Gloss
loka	e lollokka	she is wearing sandals
xasulis	e xaxxasulis	He is wearing pants
tou	e tottou	He is stabbing him
siliila	e sissiliils	She is wearing a dress
sooŋ	e sossoŋ	He is (being) angry
mwuŋo	e mwumwmwuŋo	He is eating

=== Simple sentence structure ===
Carolinian simple sentences contain two major constituents, which are the Subject Noun Phrase and the Predicate Phrase. The word order of Carolinian language is Subject-Verb-Object. The following are some example simple sentences.

	Subject Noun Phrase	Predicate Phrase
1.	Wan; John; John	e seng he cries is crying
2.	Wan; John; John	e dokto he doctor is a doctor
3.	e he he	bwel le-mwungo aspectual at-eat begins to eat
4.	E-sáál {he-not yet} he hasn't	mwungo eaten eaten yet
5.	I he	e-bwe mwungo he-will eat

== Vocabulary ==
Some researchers indicate that the Carolinian language is part of the western half of the Chuukic continuum. Its closest sister language is usually described as Satawalese. Carolinian has more in common with Woleaian- Mortlockese than with either Polowat-Pulusuk or Satawalese, but with Polowat-Pulusuk shows slightly more influence than Satawalese. The lexical stock of Chuukic languages can help determine Carolinian’s relationship to its source languages, as there is significant diversity among their lexicons. Even though each Chuukic language has a high lexical similarity of nearly 50% with other members of the continuum. the remaining 50% provides enough differences to refine Carolinian’s lines of lexical inheritance.

In addition to its native vocabulary, Carolinian has borrowed considerable vocabulary from Chamorro, English, and Japanese. This has led to the borrowing of some phonemes from these languages as well. Although these phonemes appear only in borrowed words, many of these words undergo regular Carolinian phonological rules, and the international segments are assigned in the same way as native speakers. For example, the Japanese word /dzori/, which means slipper, is borrowed into Carolinian and may be reduplicated. So /dzodzdzoori/ means to be wearing slippers.

== Orthography ==
=== Past orthographies ===
1. Most Saipan Carolinians are bilingual or trilingual. Their writing has reflected many foreign language orthographic systems. Despite the variations of Carolinian writing, the following generalizations can be made. First, the vulgarized consonants / bw, mw, pw / were often written as digraphs when the following vowels are unrounded. However, / w / or / u / was virtually never indicated before rounded vowels or word finally. This phenomenon can be traced to Chamorro writing, there is a rounded velar glide that occurs only after consonants and only before unrounded vowels. The Carolinians seem to have interpreted their vulgarized consonants as plain consonants followed by glides, like the Chamorro phones. For instance:
  libual means hole of for / libwal /, but lib means hole for / liibw / the form imual for / imwal / means his house, but imom / imwɔmw / means your house, puel for / pwpwel / means dirt, but po for / pwo / means pound.
2. The geminate consonants were not represented initially and finally, though some people wrote geminate consonants medially. This may be a result of Chamorro influence. The only geminates in Chamorro are medial and as a consequence only these geminates are reflected in writing. For example:
  pi / ppii / means sand
  lepi, leppi for / leppi / means beach sand
  mile, mille for / mille / means this one
  lol for / llɔl / means in it
3. Carolinian are used to the 5 vowel symbols of the Roman alphabet. These were used to identify the 9 distinctive vowels of the Carolinian language.
4. Long vowels were not represented maybe due to Chamorro impact, as there are no distinctive long vowels in that language. For example:
  fi / fii / means star
  set / sææt / means sea
  il for / iil / means mother
5. In writing morphophonemic regularities such as the predictable vowel qualities before possessive suffixes, Carolinians paid no attention to the underlying regulations. On the other hand, they focused on the surface phonemes. This is the same as Chamorro practice as well as to most of other Micronesian orthographies.
6. Directional suffixes were usually attached to the preceding verbs. For instance:
  muatiu / mɔɔttiu / means sit down
  mela / mæællɔ / means die
  touo / towou / means get out
7. The subject pronoun was almost invariably attached to whichever part of the verb phrase immediately was following. For example, the negative marker, the aspect marker, an aspectual adverb, or the verb itself.
  ese / e se / means he not
  ebue / e bwe / means he will
  eke, eghal / e kke, e ghal / means he progressive
  emuel / e mwmwel / means he can
8. When the determines were singular, they were usually connected to the preceding noun. For example:
  mualue /mwææl-we/ means that man
  mualie /mwææl-ie/ means this man
  Plural determiners, which were generally written separated. For example:
  mual kal /mwææl + kkaal/ means these men
  mual kelal /mwææl kke + laal/ means those men
  mual keue /mwææl kke + we/ means those men in the past
9. The longer object pronouns were sometimes separated from the preceding verb stem, while the shorter pronouns are identically attached. For example:
  e weriei means he sees me
  e uri ghisch means he sees us
10. Sometimes morphemes were not written if they were phonologically assimilated to other morphemes. For example:
  ito for / i + itto / means I come.

=== Saipan Carolinian Orthography Committee ===
A preliminary meeting was called at the Headquarters Education Department conference room on July 21, 1976. The site was decided on since it was equidistant from both the northern and southern Carolinian communities. The meeting was to review the initial steps for setting up an orthography acceptable to both communities and to select the members of the orthography committee. The official orthography conference was held from July 26 to August 4, 1976. The meeting opened with an address by the Director of Education for the Marianas. Mr. Jesus M. Conception, representatives from the Marianas Education Department and the Chamorro Orthography Committee also appeared at the convention on an irregular basis.

This convention decided that no dialect would be chosen as the official dialect for school and government documents. In other words, the committee agreed to pick standard systems of presenting the pronunciations of all three dialects, and Carolinians should use that framework to reflect the specific dialectical pronunciations. School teachers would not have to enforce one dialect but instead, allow students to use the correct spelling for the dialect they speak.

=== Alphabet ===
There were 28 letters in 1977 and they were expanded to 33 letters in 2004.

Letter	Phoneme	Name of Letter
a	/a/	aa
á	/æ/	áá
e	/e/	ee
ė	/ʌ/	ėė
i	/i/	ii
o	/o/	oo
ó	/ɔ/	óó
u	/u/	uu
ú	/ʉ/	úú
f	/f/	fii
h	/h/	hii
s	/s/	sii
sch	/ʂ/	schii
gh	/x/	ghii
k	/kː/	kkii
l	/l/	lii
m	/m/	mii
mw	/mʷˠ/	mwii
n	/n/	nii
ng	/ŋ/	ngii
p	/p/	pii
pw	/pʷˠ/	pwii
bw	/bʷˠ/	bwii
r	/r/	rii
rh	/ɻ/	rhii
tch	/ʈ͡ʂːʲ/	tchii
t	/t/	tii
w	/w/	wii
b	/b/	bii
d	/d/	dii
g	/g/	gii
y	/j/	yii
z	/z/	zii

== See also ==
- Tanapag language
