= 1995 Micronesian congressional term referendum =

7 March 1995

Results
Choice	Votes	%
Yes	14,142	45.73%
No	16,780	54.27%
Valid votes	30,922	100.00%
Invalid or blank votes	0	0.00%
Total votes	30,922	100.00%

A referendum on congressional terms was held in the Federated States of Micronesia on 7 March 1995. The proposal to set a four-year term for all members of the Congress required the approval of three-quarters of the voters in at least three of the four states. However, it was only approved by a majority of voters (but not the 75% required) in Kosrae and Yap.

== Results ==
Choice	Popular vote		State vote
Choice	Votes	%	State vote
For	14,142	45.73	0
Against	16,780	54.27	4
Invalid/blank votes		–	–
Total	30,922	100	4
Registered voters/turnout			–
Source: Direct Democracy

=== By state ===
State	For		Against		Total
State	Votes	%	Votes	%	Total
Chuuk	6,264	42.26	8,559	57.74	14,823
Kosrae	1,741	63.17	1,015	36.83	2,756
Pohnpei	4,116	39.98	6,178	60.02	10,294
Yap	2,021	66.28	1,028	33.72	3,049
Source: Direct Democracy
