= Sorol =

Atoll in Yap State, Micronesia

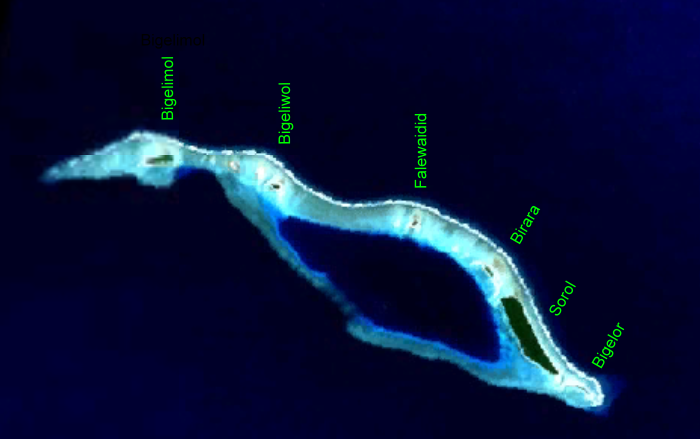
- NASA picture of Sorol Atoll

- Location of Sorol in Yap State, Federated States of Micronesia

Geography
- Location: North Pacific
- Coordinates: 8°08′N 140°25′E
- Archipelago: Caroline
- Total islands: 9
- Area: 0.934 km^{2} (0.361 sq mi)
- Highest elevation: 2 m (7 ft)

Administration
- Federated States of Micronesia
- State: Yap

Demographics
- Population: 0 (2010)
- Ethnic groups: Micronesian

Sorol is a coral atoll of nine islands in the central Caroline Islands in the Pacific Ocean, and forms a municiality in Yap State in the Federated States of Micronesia. Sorol is located approximately 150 kilometers (93 mi) south of Ulithi and 250 kilometers (160 mi) southeast of the island of Yap. Sorol has been uninhabited since the early 1980s. Sorol is a municipality of the state of Yap.

== History ==
Sorol was once a chiefdom part of the sawei exchange network. While most member islands sent tribute to their superior in a westward chain leading to Gagil in Yap, Sorol, along with Fais, was an exception, as an Ulithian emissary came to Sorol to receive the tribute their paramount chief was owed. This was due to the Sorol people's lack of navigational tradition.

The first recorded sighting of Sorol Island by the Western world was by the Spanish navigator Alonso de Arellano on 22 January 1565 onboard the patache San Lucas.

As with all of the Caroline Islands, they were sold by Spain to the Empire of Germany in 1899. The island came under the control of the Empire of Japan after World War I, and was subsequently administered under the South Seas Mandate. Following World War II. It then came under the control of the United States of America and was administered as part of the Trust Territory of the Pacific Islands from 1947, and became part of the Federated States of Micronesia in 1979.

== Geography ==
The atoll is 12.5 kilometers (7.8 mi) long east–west, and up to 3.5 kilometers (2.2 mi) wide. The northern rim of the atoll consists of a reef with several islets. Its total land area is only 0.934 square kilometers (0.361 sq mi), but it encloses a 45 meters (148 ft) deep lagoon of 7.1 square kilometers (2.7 sq mi). The shorter southern rim is less well-developed and narrower than the northern rim, with two small passages into the lagoon. Only the four largest islets are vegetated.

Among the individual islets are the following:

- Bigelimol (northwesternmost)
- Bigeliwol (northwest)
- Bigelor (southeasternmost)
- Birara (south)
- Falewaidid (north)
- Sorol (southeast)
