= Ifalik =

Pacific atoll in Yap State, Federated States of Micronesia

Ifalik Ifaliug
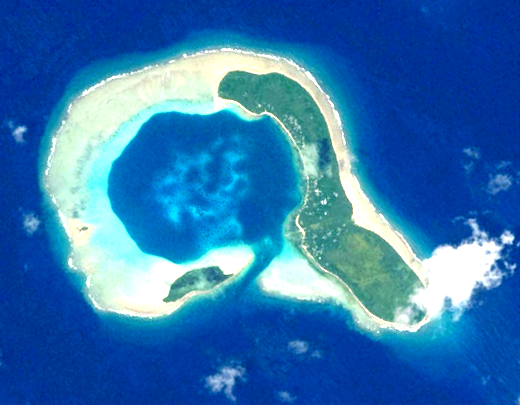
- NASA picture of Ifalik Atoll

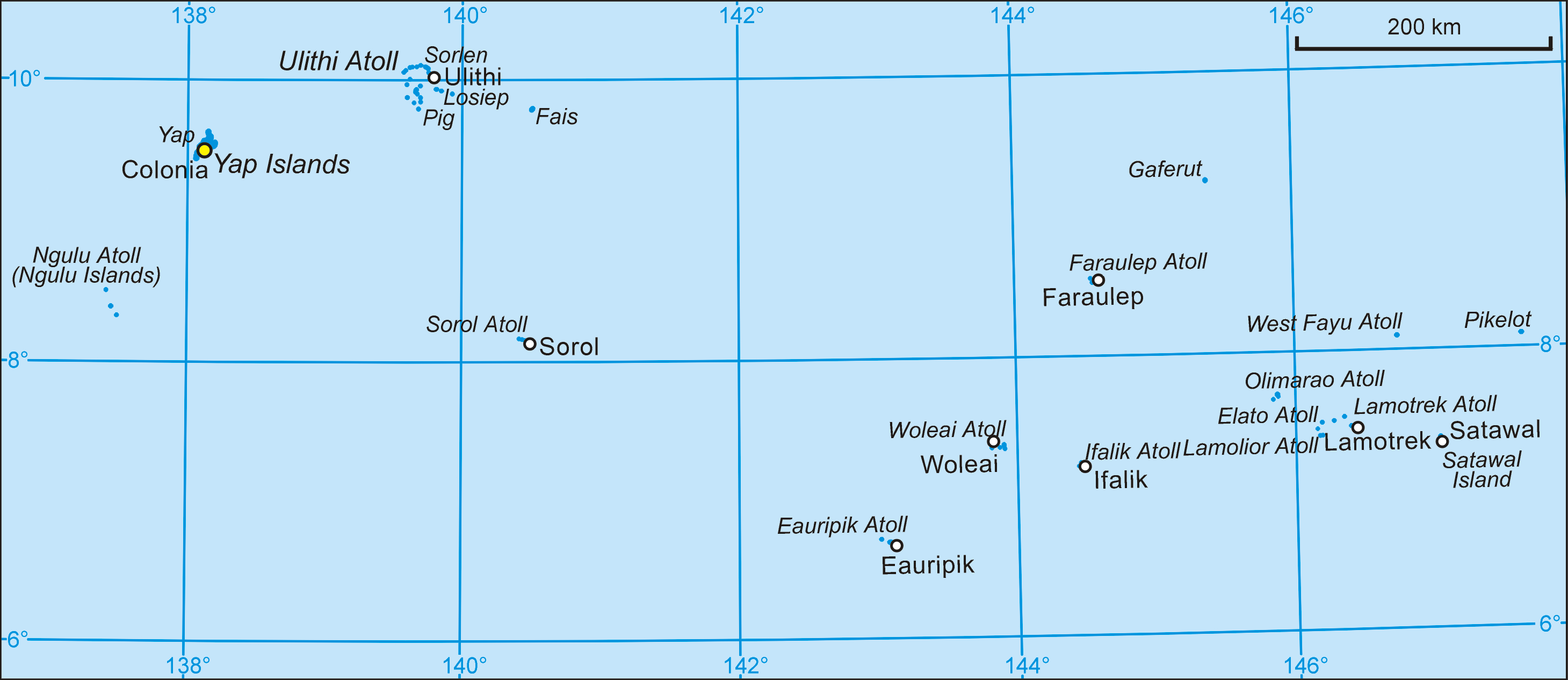

Geography
- Location: North Pacific
- Coordinates: 7°15′N 144°27′E
- Archipelago: Caroline
- Total islands: 4
- Area: 1.47 km^{2} (0.57 sq mi)
- Highest elevation: 2 m (7 ft)

Administration
- Federated States of Micronesia

Demographics
- Population: 561 (2000)
- Ethnic groups: Micronesian

Ifalik, also spelled Ifaluk (Woleaian: Ifaliug), is a coral atoll of four islands in the central Caroline Islands in the Pacific Ocean, and forms a legislative district in Yap State in the Federated States of Micronesia. Ifalik is located approximately 40 kilometers (25 mi) east of Woleai and 700 kilometers (430 mi) southeast of the island of Yap. The population of Ifalik was 561 in 2000, living on 1.5 km^{2}. The primary islets of Ifalik are called Ella, Elangelap, Rawaii, and Flalap, which is the atoll's main island.

== Geography ==
Location of Ifalik in the Pacific Ocean

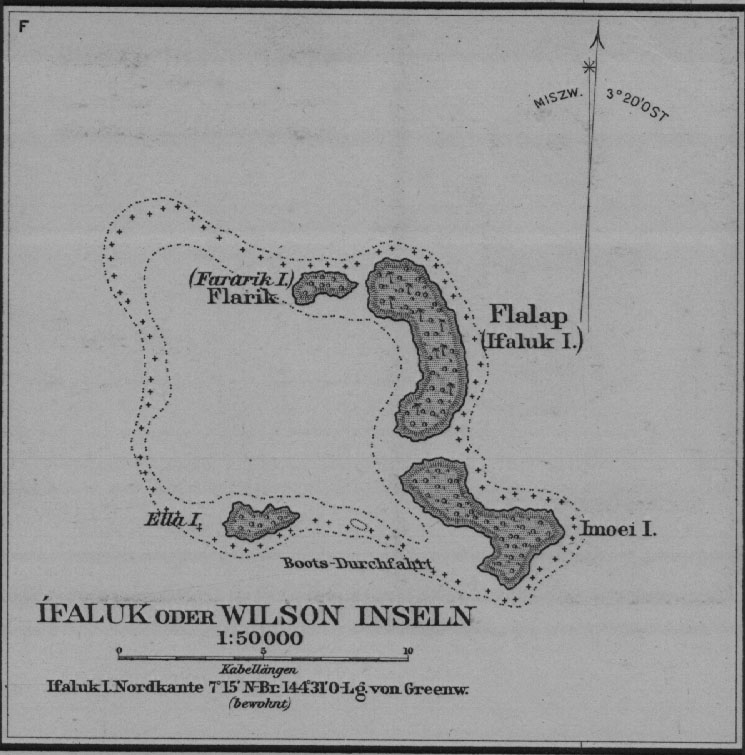
Old Map of Ifalik

The total land area of Ifalik is only 1.47 square kilometers (0.57 sq mi), but it encloses a 20 meters (66 ft) deep lagoon of 2.43 square kilometers (0.94 sq mi). The total area is about six square kilometers.

== History ==
Ifalik is known as a “warrior island”. Prior to European contact, its warriors invaded the outer islands in Yap as well as some of the outer islands in Chuuk. Atolls under the attack included, Lamotrek, Faraulep, Woleai, Elato, Satawal, Ulithi, and Poluwat (outer islet of Chuuk).

As with all of the Caroline Islands, sovereignty passed to the Empire of Germany in 1899. The island came under the control of the Empire of Japan after World War I, and was subsequently administered under the South Seas Mandate. Following World War II, the island came under the control of the United States of America and was administered as part of the Trust Territory of the Pacific Islands from 1947, and became part of the Federated States of Micronesia from 1979…
