= Yap State =

Constituent state of the Federation of Micronesia

Yap State Nam nu Wa'ab
- State
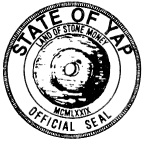
- Flag Seal
- Nickname: The Island of Stone Money
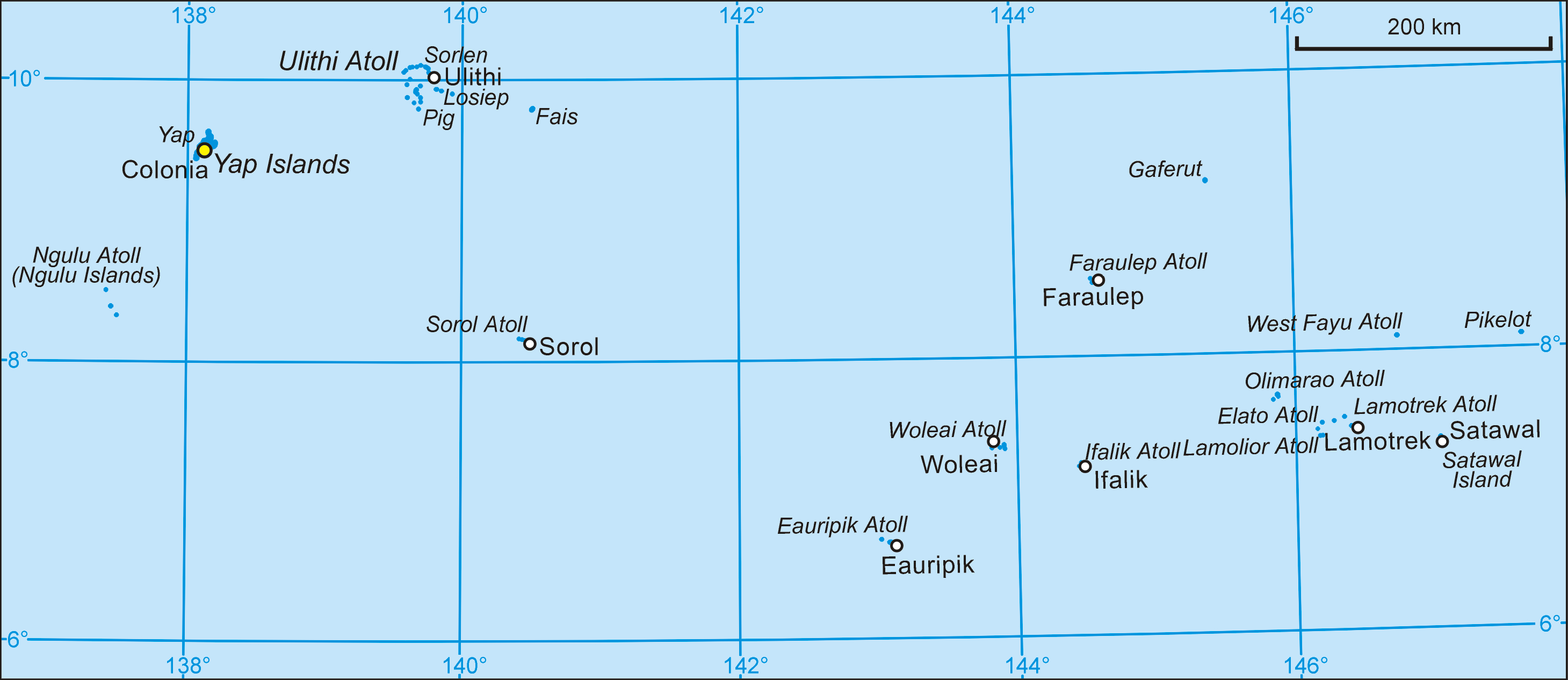
- Map of Yap State

- Yap in the Federated States of Micronesia
- Coordinates: 9.52°N 138.12°E
- Country: Federated States of Micronesia
- Capital: Colonia

Government
  - Governor: Francis Itimai

Area
  - Total: 119.54 km^{2} (46.15 sq mi)

Population (2023)
  - Total: 10,739
  - Density: 89.836/km^{2} (232.67/sq mi)
- Demonym: Yapese
- Time zone: UTC+10
- Federated States of Micronesia (FSM): 96943
- ISO 3166 code: FM-YAP
- Website: www.yapstate.gov.fm

Yap State is one of the four states of the Federated States of Micronesia, located in the westernmost portion of the country. The state borders Palau to the southwest, Guam to the north, and Chuuk State to the east. According to the Federated States of Micronesia population census carried out in 2023, the total population is 10,739 residing across a total area of 119.54 sq km (46.15 sq mi), though a large majority of the area is water. The only town area in the state, Colonia, serves as the state capital.

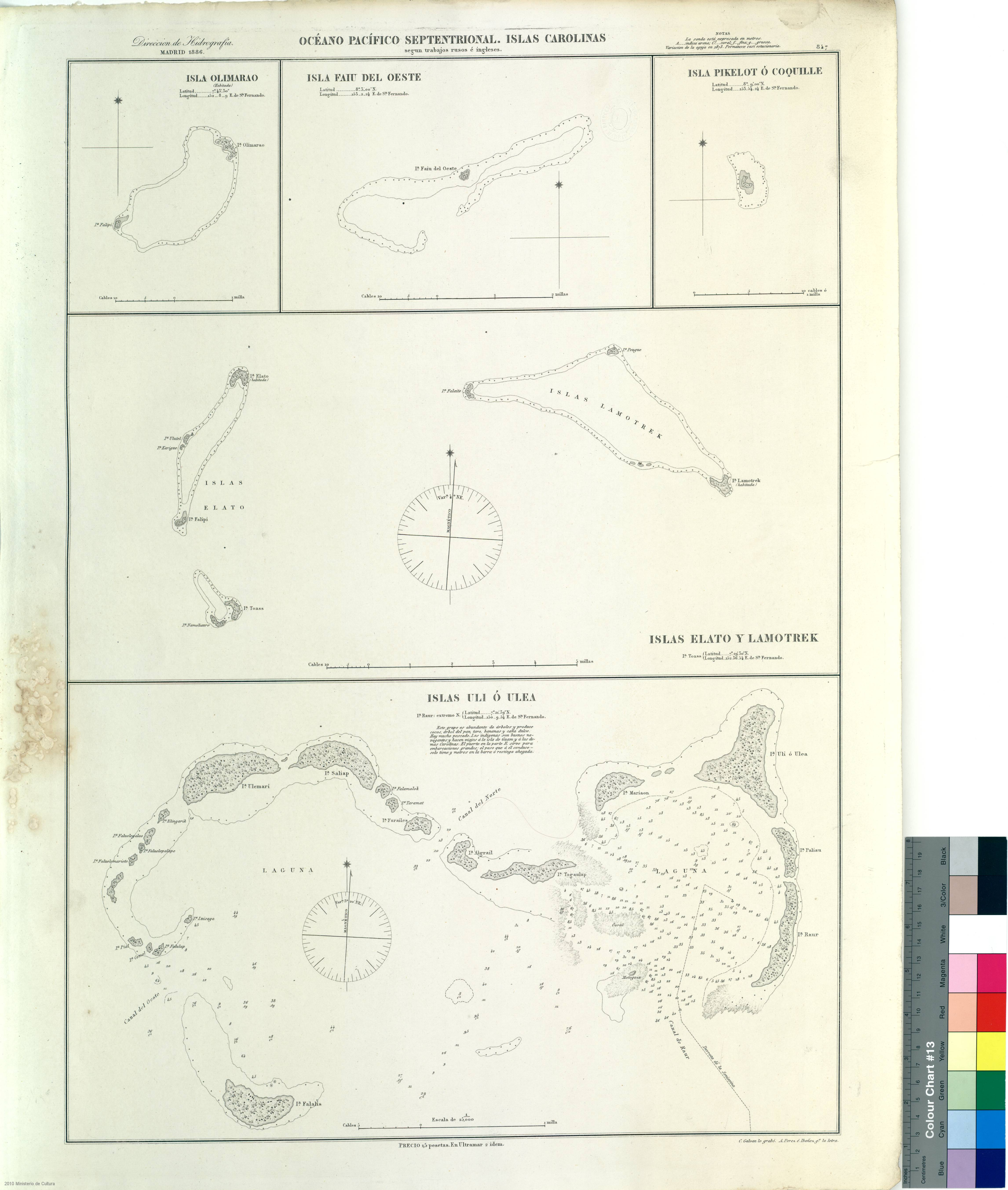
1886 Spanish nautical map, shows Olimaraos, Piagailoe (West Fayu), Pikelot, Elato, Lamotrek, and Woleai islands

What is now current-day Yap State and some parts of Chuuk State were the historical Yapese Empire, which at its peak, controlled 1,300 km of the western Pacific comprising all the inhabited islands and atolls between Yap and Chuuk. The rulers of the chiefdom of Gagil in Yap maintained sovereignty of these islands to the east and extracted resources and tribute, maintaining close economic and political relationships with the different island groups. After losing its influence and becoming incorporated territories of Spain, the German Empire, the Japanese Empire, and the United States through the UN-mandated Trust Territory of the Pacific Islands (TTPI), Yap and the islands and atolls between Yap and Chuuk formed Yap State upon the founding of the FSM.

According to the FSM Statistics Office, the population of Colonia and the municipalities of Yap State was 11,577 in 2020. The state has a total land area of 102 km^{2} (39 sq mi).

== History ==
The islands are thought to have been populated from the Malay Archipelago. In approximately 950 AD, it was the seat of the Yapese Empire, contemporary to the Tu'i Tonga Empire. The outer islands, now part of the Yap state, were settled from Polynesia.

The island nation formerly used rai stones as currency. Since this stone money had to be made from a rock that could not be extracted on the island, its value derived from the dangers taken on expeditions to obtain it, mainly from Palau.

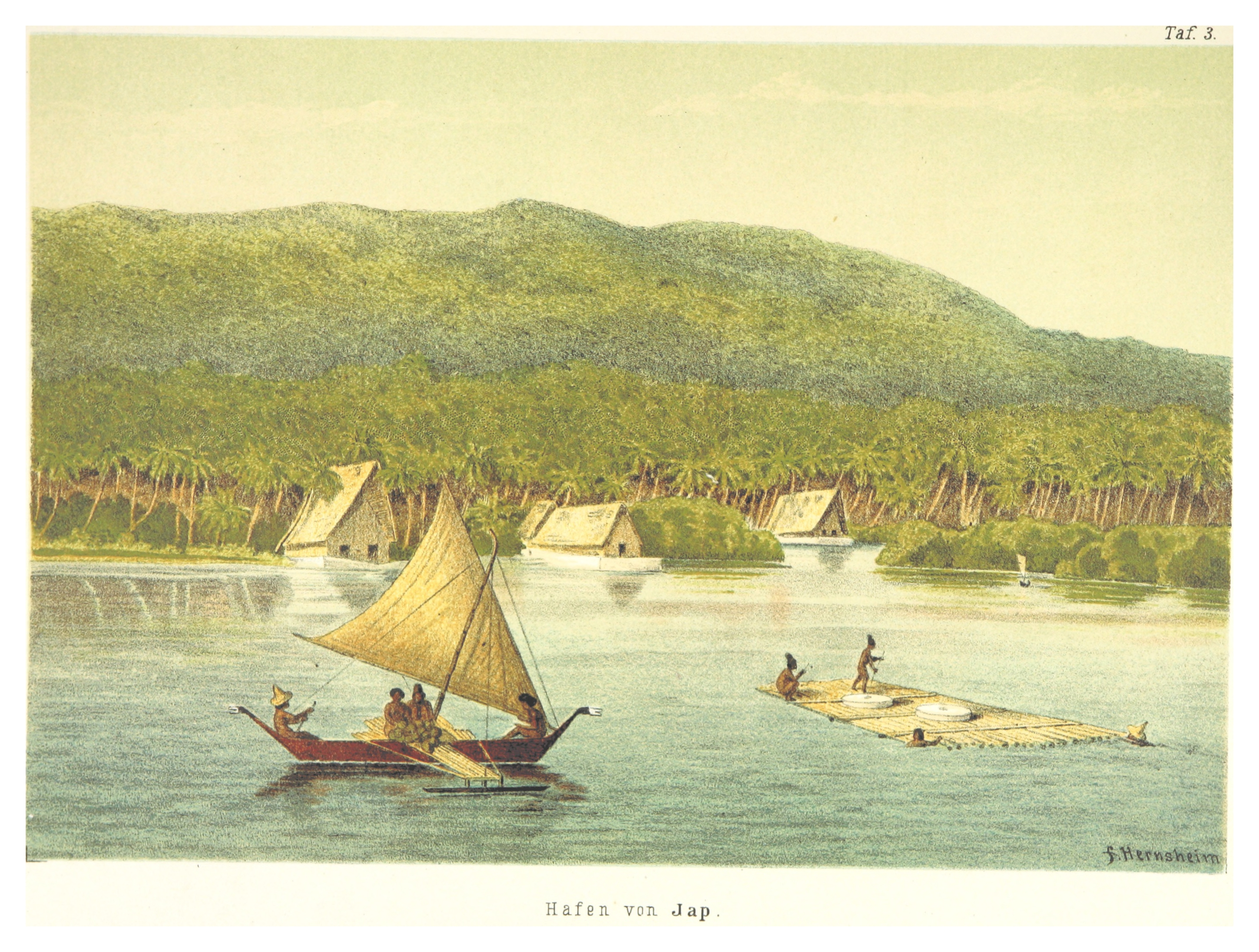
The harbour of Yap in 1883

The Portuguese were the first Westerners to visit the island in 1525 when the navigator Diogo da Rocha arrived in Ulithi and stayed there for four months.

The Yap Island was under Spanish rule from the 16th century until the end of the 19th century. Still, most of the communities on the islands of the present state of Yap had little contact with Europeans and lived in complete independence. In 1885, following a conflict between Spain and Germany known as the Carolines Question, the arbitration of Pope Leo XIII confirmed possession to Spain against commercial advantages for Germany.

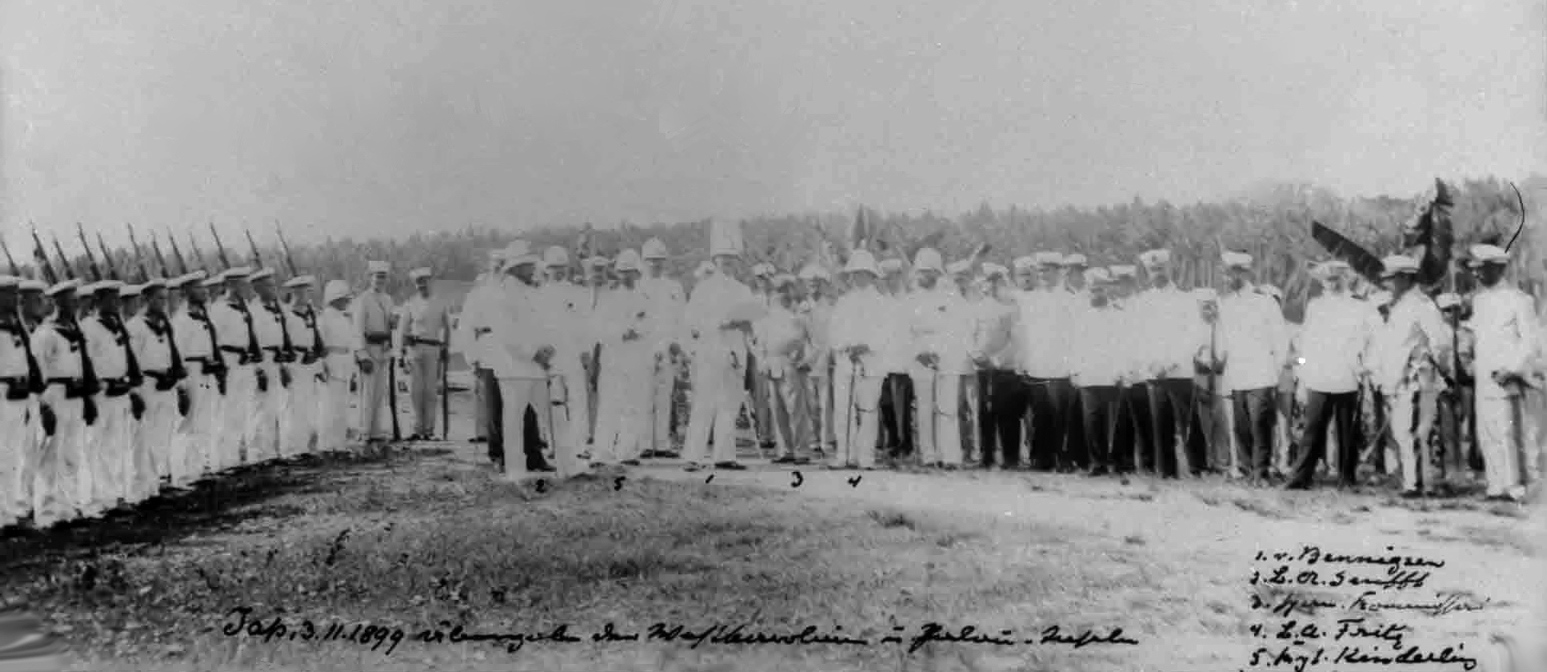
Handover Ceremony of the Western Caroline Islands and Palau by Spain to the German Empire on the island of Yap, 3 November 1899

On June 30, 1899, after the Spanish–American War, Spain sold the Carolines, the Palau Islands, and the majority of the Marianas to the German Empire.

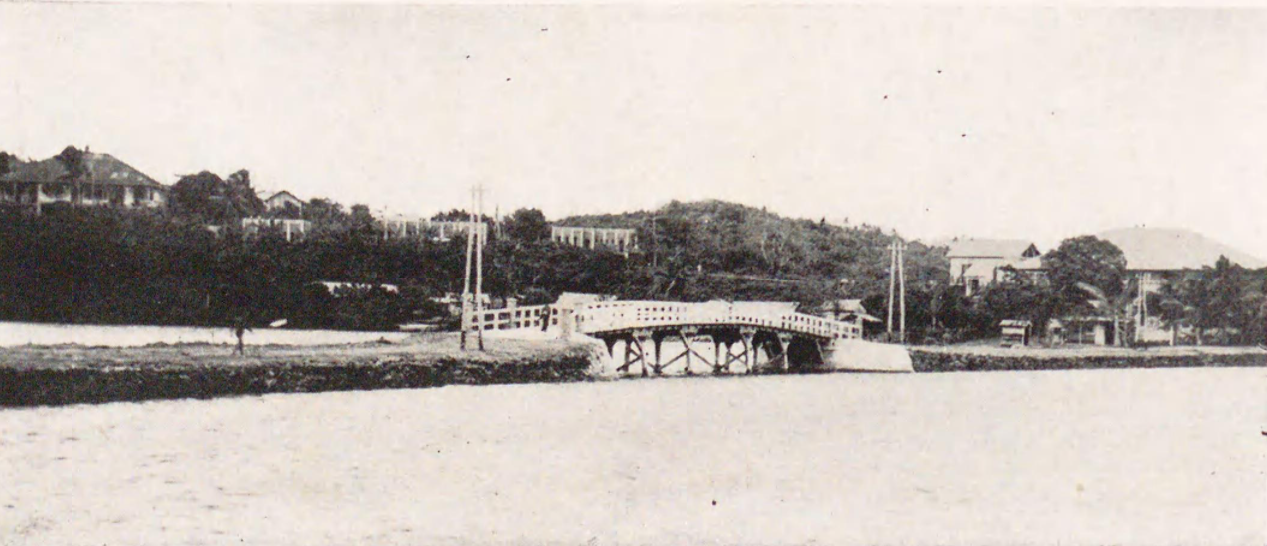
A bridge in Yap Island in 1932 during the Japanese Administration of the islands.

At the start of World War I, in 1914, the Empire of Japan occupied the area. This occupation was formally recognized within the framework of the Mandate of the Pacific Islands created in 1919 by the League of Nations.

The Caroline Islands came under the control of the United States during World War II, in 1944, which administered them as a Trust Territory of the Pacific Islands under a UN mandate received in 1947. The state was once the Yap District of the Trust Territory of the Pacific Islands. On May 10, 1979, Yap ratified the Constitution of the Federated States of Micronesia and became an integral part of this new nation with official independence on November 3, 1986.

== Geography ==
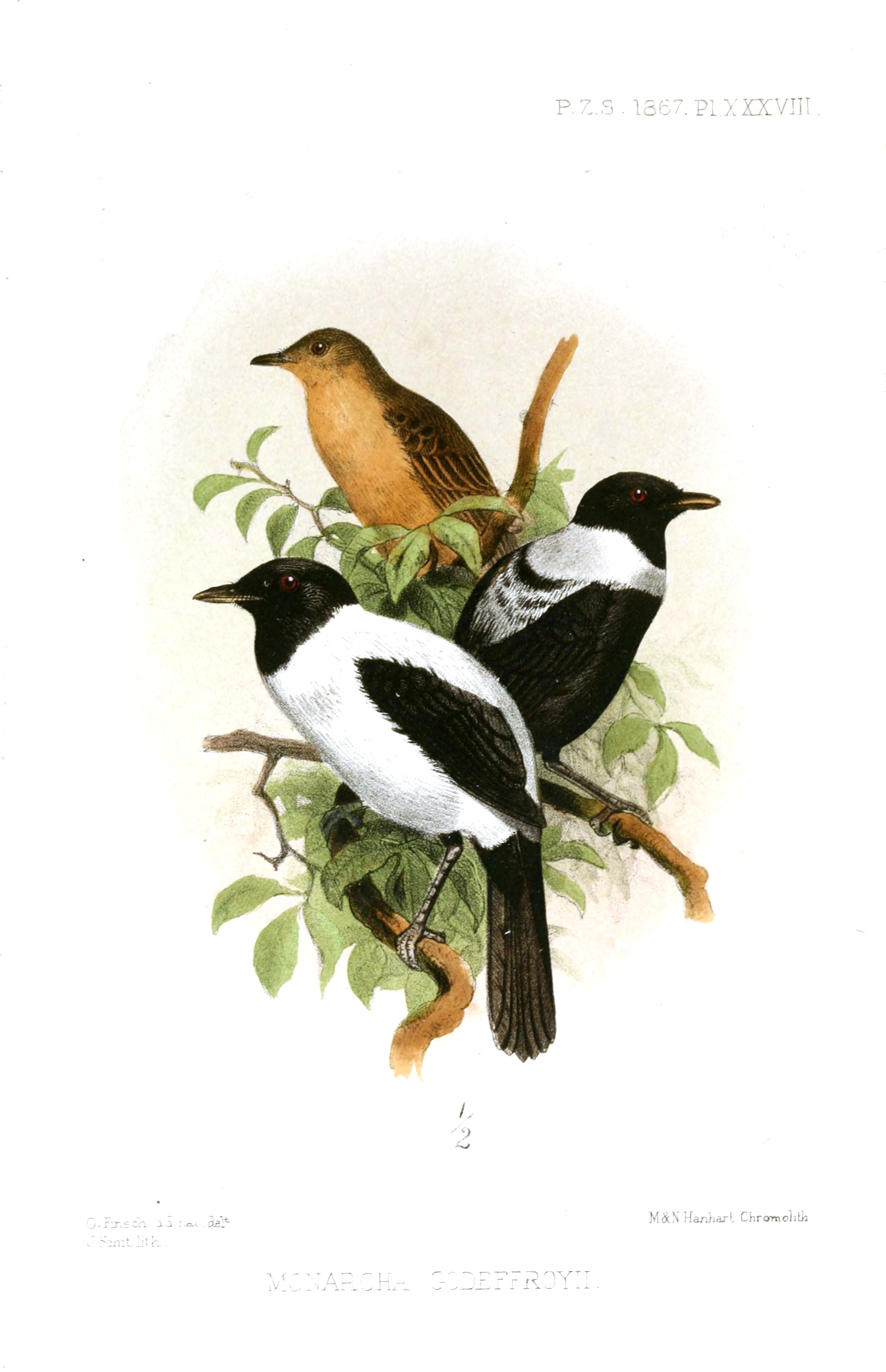
The Yap Monarch, the State Bird of Yap. The bird is native exclusively to the Yapese Main Islands.

Yap State is the westernmost state of the Micronesian Federation. Further eastwards in order are the states of Chuuk, Pohnpei, and Kosrae. It consists of the four main islands of Rumung, Maap, Gagil-Tamil, and Yap Proper (Marbaa') and 134 smaller islands southwest and east of Yap. The state stretches from the Yap main islands towards the east to Chuuk for 1,200 to 1,500 kilometers (750 to 930 mi; 650 to 810 nmi).

The Yapese Main Islands are located approximately 800 kilometers (500 mi; 430 nmi) southwest of Guam, 3,200 kilometers (2,000 mi; 1,700 nmi) from Tokyo, 2,000 kilometers (1,200 mi; 1,100 nmi) from Manila, and 8,000 kilometers (5,000 mi; 4,300 nmi) from Honolulu.

== Languages ==
Yap State has five official languages: English, Ulithian, Woleaian, Satawalese and Yapese.

== Demographics ==
According to the FSM Statistics Division, the 2023 population of Yap State is 10,739. The state has the third-largest population among the states in the FSM, with Chuuk and Pohnpei leading in this order. The population of the state consists mainly of the local Yapese, Ulithians, Woleaians and Satawalese people; however, the state has been seeing a rise in the number of foreign citizens from countries such as the United States, Japan, Palau and the Philippines.

=== Religion ===
According to the 2018 International Religious Freedom Report compiled by the United States Department of State, an estimated 80% of the state population is Catholic, and the remainder is Protestant. Religious affiliation tends to follow clan lines. A majority of foreign citizens in the FSM and the state is made up of Filipino Catholics.

== Municipalities ==
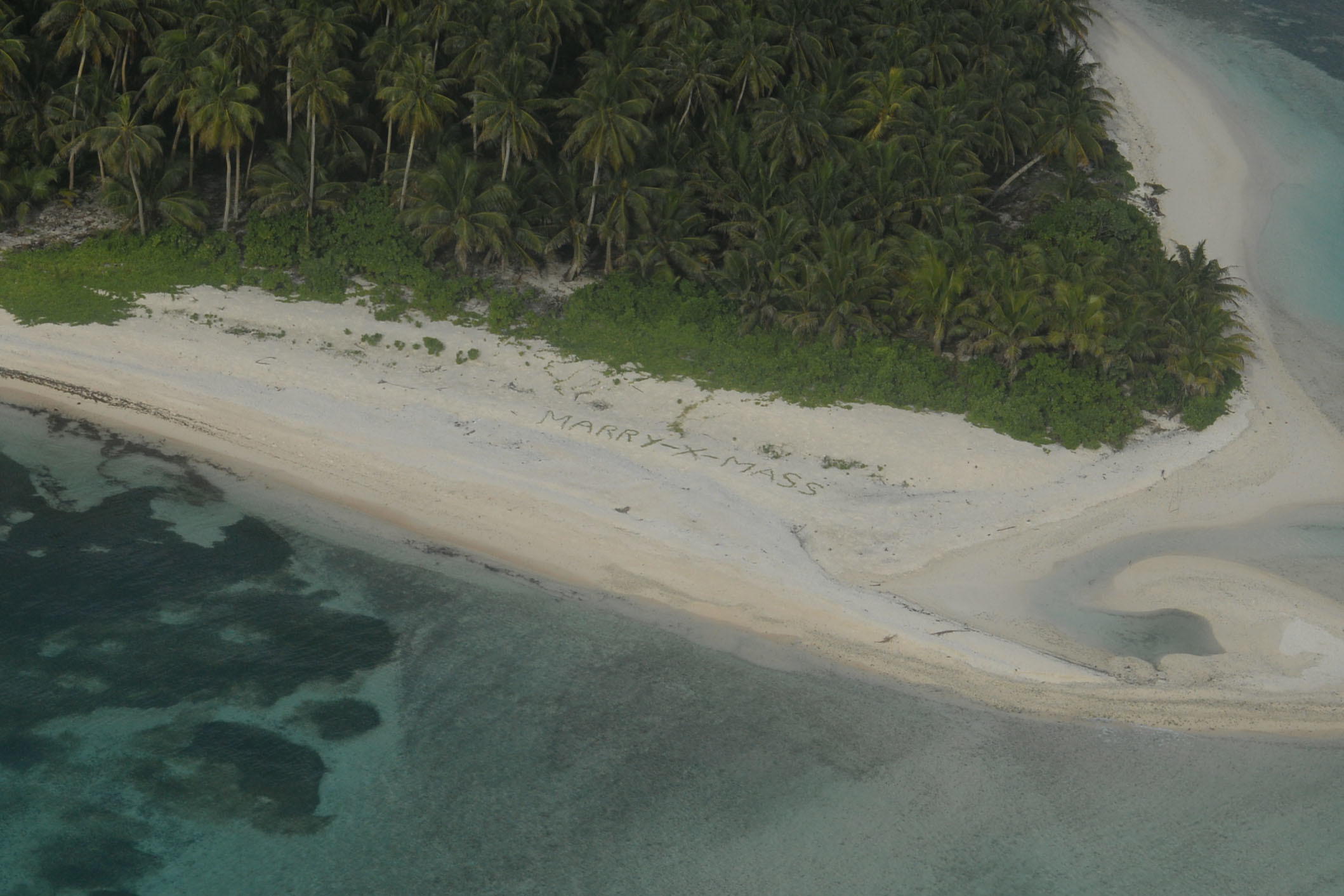
Falalap, Woleai Atoll

Yap State is divided into 21 municipalities, with each municipality having several village units incorporated through customs and historically set boundary lines. Each municipality can be placed in one of five main island groupings: Rumung, Maap, Gagil-Tamil, Marbaa' and the Neighboring Islands. The first four groupings are part of Yap Proper.

These municipalities are listed with their populations at the 2010 Census:

Municipalities (Population, 2010 Census)
Yap Main Islands (7,371)				Neighboring Islands (4,006)
Rumung	Maap	Gagil-Tamil	Marbaa'	Neighboring Islands (4,006)
Rumung (58)	Maap (621)	Gagil (863)	Fanif (509)	Eauripik (114)
		Tamil (1,231)	Weloy (1,031)	Elato (105)
			Dalipebinaw (397)	Fais (294)
			Kanifay (314)	Faraulep (193)
			Rull (2,095)	Ifalik (578)
			Gilman (252)	Lamotrek (329)
				Ngulu (6)
Satawal (501)
Sorol (0)
Ulithi (847)
Woleai (1,039)

Not included: Pikelot

== Politics and government ==
Yap State is one of the four federal states of the Federated States of Micronesia. As a democratic federation, each state can retain a large amount of power within the state as well as a certain level of sovereignty typical of federal states. As such, the State adheres to the FSM National and Yap State constitutions to develop policies and regulations.

The State Government is unique because it consists of four government branches, each serving a specific function for policymaking. The Executive Branch consists of the Governor as well as the Lieutenant Governor, along with the members of the government departments affiliated with the branch. The Executive Branch is responsible for executing laws and administering government services. The Yap State Legislature makes up the Legislative Branch, responsible for creating, debating, and passing bills for the Executive Branch to approve into law and enforce. The Yap State Court makes up the Judicial Branch, responsible for ensuring laws passed do not violate the state and national constitutions. The unique traditional branch vests its power into two groups of Yapese chiefs. The group of Yap Main Island chiefs is known as the Council of Pilung, and the group of Yapese outer island chiefs is known as the Council of Tamol. The two councils make sure whether proposed bills do not violate local traditional customs and regulate cultural issues.

Information about some state government leaders and administrative staff is included below.

Legislative Branch: Legislature of Yap State
Roles/Responsibilities	Individual
Speaker of the Legislature	Hon. Nicholas Figirlaarwon
Vice Speaker	Hon. Theodore "Ted" Rutun
Floor Leader	Hon. Terrence Fong
Chairman, Committee on Finance	Hon. Pius Telimesei
Vice Chairman, Committee on Finance	Hon. Anne Marie Laamar
Chairman, Committee on Health and Welfare	Hon. Victor Bamog
Vice Chairman, Committee on Health and Welfare	Hon. Gabriel Ramoloilug
Chairman, Committee on Resources, Education and Development	Hon. John A. Mafel
Vice Chairman, Committee on Resources, Education and Development	Hon. Liyon Sulog
Other Members	Hon. John Masiwemai
Chief Clerk	Dee N. Libian
Assistant Chief Clerk	Ben Chosmal
Budget Officer	Noimilynn N.F. Pigao
Administrative Secretary	Theresa Kitin
Legislative Counsel	Genevieve M. Mangefel
Assistant Legislative Counsel	Vacant

Executive Branch
Roles/Responsibilities	Individual		
Governor	Hon. Charles S. Chieng		
Lieutenant Governor	Hon. Francis Itimai		
Acting Attorney General	Quintina Letawerpiy		
Acting Chief, Division of Public Safety	Zachary Gamow		
Director, Administrative Services	Thomas Gilwuyoch Tun		
Director, Planning and Budget	Julius Liyon Tun		
Director, Youth and Civic Affairs	Alex Gilfiley		
Director, Department of Resources & Development	Bernard Gorong		
Director, Department of Public Works & Transportation	Joe Giltug		
Director, Department of Health Services	Theo Thinnifel		
Director, Department of Education	Dominic Fanasog	Commissioner, Yap State Election Office	VACANT

Judicial Branch: Yap State Court
Roles/Responsibilities	Individual
Chief Justice	Hon. Cyprian Manmaw
Associate Justice	Hon. Jesse Torwan
	Hon. Jonathan M. Tun
Yap State Court Counsel	Seema Shaw, Esq.
Clerk of Court	Julianne Giley
Court Administrator	Achilles Defngin

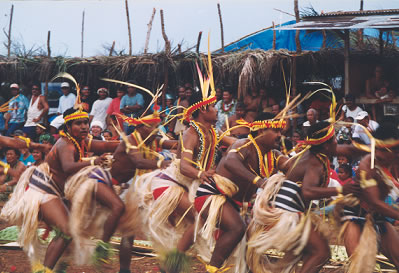
Yapese dancers in traditional dress celebrating Yap Day through a men's standing dance.

Traditional Leaders: Council of Pilung, Council of Tamol
Roles/Responsibilities	Individual
Chairman, Council of Pilung	Hon. Thomas Falngin
Chairman, Council of Tamol	Hon. Paul Marlul

Select Government Agencies/Organisations
Roles/Responsibilities	Individual
Public Defender	[VACANT]
MLSC, Dir. Attorney	John T. Mootmag, Esq.
Acting Director, Yap Environmental Protection Agency	Jordan Mautaman
Director, Yap Community Action Program	Sabino Sauchomal
Director, Yap Investment Trust	Patricia D. Moonfel
Director, Yap Fishing Authority	Timothy Igemai
Director, Yap State Public Service Corporation	Victor Nabeyan
Director, Yap State Public Library	Erica Ruepin
Director, Yap Visitors Authority	Susan Gooliyan
Director, Yap Sports Council Office	Lawrence Uwelur

== Climate ==
Climate data for Yap
Month	Jan	Feb	Mar	Apr	May	Jun	Jul	Aug	Sep	Oct	Nov	Dec	Year
Record high °C (°F)	33 (91)	34 (93)	34 (93)	35 (95)	35 (95)	34 (94)	34 (93)	36 (96)	34 (94)	34 (94)	34 (94)	36 (96)	36 (96)
Mean daily maximum °C (°F)	30.1 (86.2)	30.2 (86.4)	31.1 (88.0)	31.2 (88.2)	30.9 (87.6)	30.7 (87.3)	30.6 (87.1)	30.8 (87.4)	30.9 (87.6)	30.9 (87.6)	30.4 (86.7)	30.7 (87.3)	30.7 (87.3)
Daily mean °C (°F)	26.8 (80.2)	26.9 (80.4)	27.5 (81.5)	27.6 (81.7)	27.3 (81.1)	27.1 (80.8)	27.1 (80.8)	27.1 (80.8)	27.2 (81.0)	27.3 (81.1)	27.1 (80.8)	27.2 (81.0)	27.2 (81.0)
Mean daily minimum °C (°F)	23.5 (74.3)	23.5 (74.3)	24.0 (75.2)	24.1 (75.4)	23.8 (74.8)	23.6 (74.5)	23.4 (74.1)	23.4 (74.1)	23.5 (74.3)	23.7 (74.7)	23.8 (74.8)	23.7 (74.7)	23.7 (74.7)
Record low °C (°F)	19 (67)	19 (66)	19 (66)	19 (67)	18 (65)	19 (66)	18 (65)	19 (66)	19 (66)	17 (63)	18 (65)	17 (63)	17 (63)
Average precipitation mm (inches)	186 (7.33)	152 (5.98)	151 (5.96)	146 (5.76)	230 (9.06)	322 (12.69)	369 (14.54)	386 (15.20)	343 (13.51)	304 (11.97)	230 (9.07)	228 (8.99)	3,050 (120.06)
Average precipitation days (≥ 1.0 mm)	16.8	13.4	13.7	12.6	17.1	20.2	21.2	20.9	19.3	20.1	18.7	17.6	211.6
Average relative humidity (%)	82	81	80	79	81	83	84	84	84	84	83	83	82
Mean monthly sunshine hours	210.8	211.9	251.1	255.0	244.9	201.0	189.1	176.7	180.0	170.5	192.0	198.4	2,481.4
Source 1: Weatherbase
Source 2: Hong Kong Observatory (sun, precipitation 1961–1990)

== Economy ==
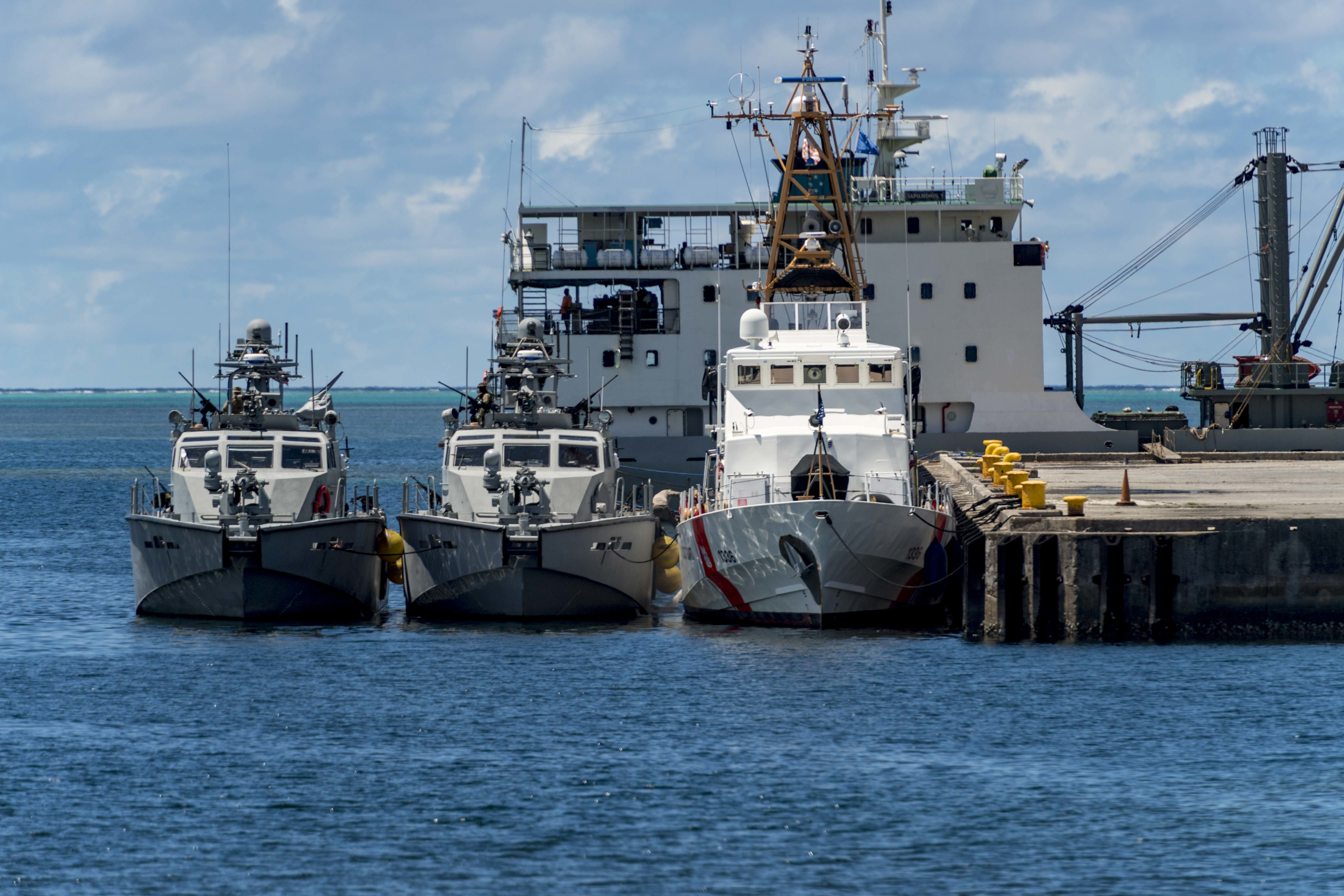
US patrol vessels in Tamil Harbor, Yap Island.

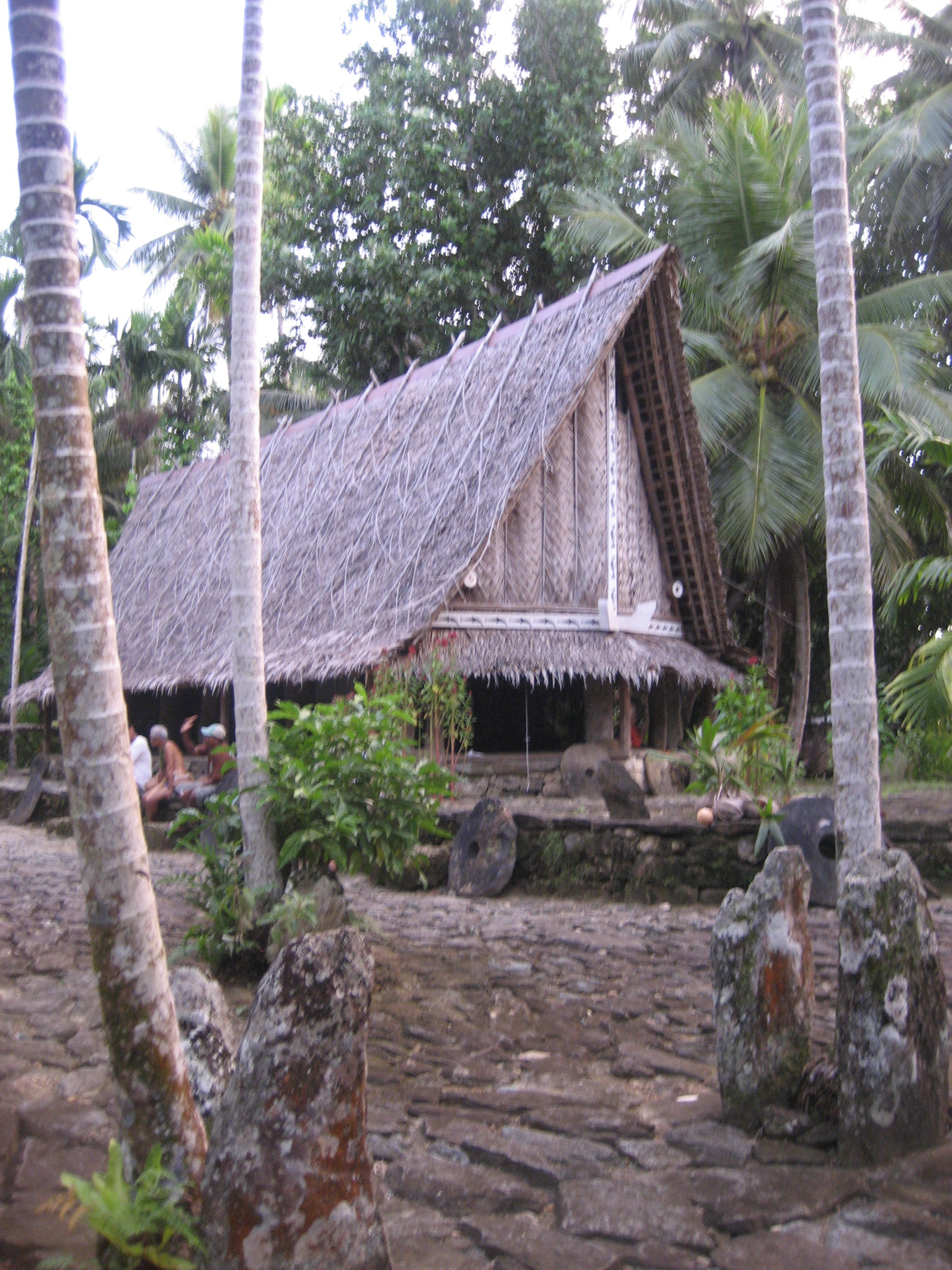
Traditional meeting house on Yap

The GDP per capita in 2018 was US$4,510, while the total GDP in 2018 was US$52 million. According to the 2010 Labor Market Statistics data compiled by the FSM Statistics Office, 67% of the total state population is in the labor force, the highest percentage of people in the labor force in the entire nation. Most of those in the labor force are in formal work, while the rest are in home production, including subsistence.

Yap has a relatively small tourism industry, with the Yap Visitors Bureau reporting only 4,000 annual visitors from 2010 to 2017. China's Exhibition & Travel Group has announced plans to develop a 4,000-unit resort on the island. Businesses that contribute to the state's tourism share of state GDP are Manta Ray Resort and Spa, ESA, and Yap Pacific Dive Resort.

The largest retail businesses in the State are Yap Cooperative Association (YCA) General Store, Guang Mao Enterprises, Yap Savemore Enterprises and EMI Enterprises. These businesses contribute primarily to the State's retail and wholesale sectors.

The State also has a small but essential financial sector that supports the population's investment and capital needs, local small- and medium-enterprises (SMEs), the government and state institutions, and the academic sector. It has five financial services institutions: the Bank of Guam (BOG), the Bank of the Federated States of Micronesia (BFSM), Community Ayuw Services Credit Union, Western Union, and the FSM Development Bank.

The State is now expected to be one of the fastest-growing economies in the country as technological innovation is highly encouraged. Although the FSM communications industry is largely monopolized by the state-operated FSM Telecommunications Corporation based in Pohnpei, Yap saw the rise of the tech startup company iBoom when the company is expected to utilise the National Government's Digital FSM Project 2017 grant funding from the World Bank to connect each home, work office, etc. iBoom is expected to challenge previous monopoly of the FSM Telecom Corporation through competitive pricing and services.

== Transportation ==
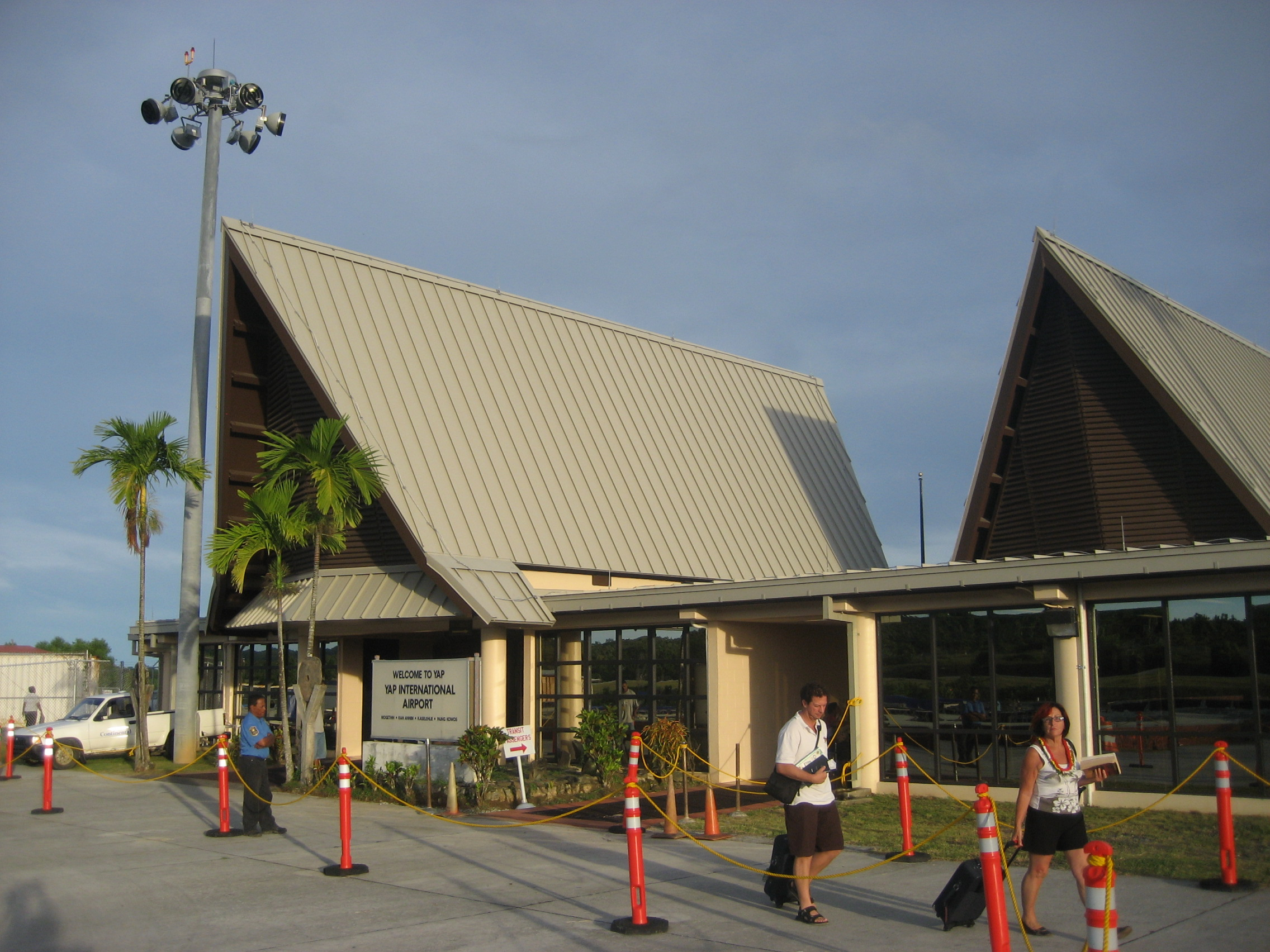
Yap International Airport

Yap International Airport receives service from United Airlines as well as Pacific Mission Aviation. The state also has a small dockyard, colloquially known as Gampek, in Colonia just south of Tamil Harbor that services maritime vessels for inter-state and cross-border transport and freight.

== Education ==
Post-secondary institutions:

- College of Micronesia-FSM Yap Campus in Rull
- FSM Fisheries and Maritime Institute in Gagil

State secondary schools:

- Yap High School in Colonia
- Woleai High School in Woleai
- Outer Islands High School in Ulithi

Private Secondary and Elementary Schools:

- Yap Catholic High School in Lamer village, Rull
- Saint Mary's School in Colonia
- Yap Seventh Day Adventist School in Tamil
- Faith Christian Academy in Makiy, Gagil
- Yap International Christian School in Gaanelay, Rull

== Notable people ==
- John Mangefel: FSM Founding Father; First State Governor
- Petrus Tun: FSM Founding Father; first FSM Vice President; Second State Governor
- Jennifer Chieng: Boxer and mixed martial artist (MMA)
- Manuel Minginfel: Yap State renowned Weightlifter and FSM Olympian

== See also ==
- Federated States of Micronesia
- Habele, a South Carolina–based charitable organization providing private economic educational assistance in Yap
- History of the Federated States of Micronesia.
- Traditional Councils in the Yap State
