= Woleai script =

Historical script of the Woleaian language

Woleai
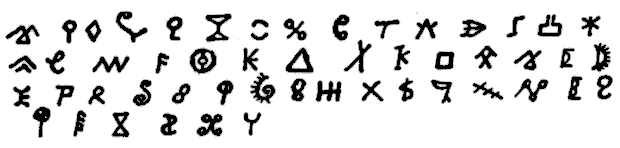
- Woleaian syllabary as written by Egilimar in 1913
- Script type: Syllabary
- Period: c. 1910 to c. 1950
- Direction: Mixed
- Languages: Woleaian

ISO 15924
- ISO 15924: Wole (480), Woleai

The Woleai or Caroline Island script, thought to have been a syllabary, was a partially Latin-based script indigenous to Woleai Atoll and nearby islands of Micronesia and used to write the Woleaian language until the mid-20th century. At the time the script was first noticed by Europeans, this part of Micronesia was known as the Caroline Islands, hence the name Caroline Island script.

The script has 99 known (C)V glyphs, which are not quite enough for a complete representation of the Woleaian language, even given that consonant and vowel length are ignored. Approximately a fifth of them derive from the Latin alphabet. The question for historians is whether the Wolaians had proto-writing which crystallized into full-fledged writing under the influence of the Latin alphabet, or if they were exposed to the Latin alphabet without completely understanding it (see trans-cultural diffusion), and supplemented it either with existing signs from petroglyphs, tattoos, and the like, or by creating new rebus or ad hoc symbols, until it was sufficient to fully express Woleaian.

The script was written from left to right. Since length was ignored, one glyph stood for both ga and ka ([xa] and [kːa]), and another for both la and na ([la], [na], and [nːa]). Some glyphs stood for longer syllables than just consonant-plus-vowel, such as bag, warr, tüt, moi, shrö, chroa, and gkaa. Not enough glyphs were recorded to write all Woleaian syllables this way, and it is not known if the script was fully standardized.

== History ==
In 1905 a lost missionary named Alfred Snelling and his Chuukese crew landed on Eauripik, a Woleaian-speaking atoll 100 km to the southwest of Woleai proper. There they taught the islanders the Latin orthography of Chuukese. The Woleaians, perhaps not given enough time to grasp the concept of an alphabet where each syllable is written as consonant plus vowel, understood each letter to represent its name, and thus interpreted the Latin alphabet as a defective syllabary that could only represent simple vowels and consonants plus the vowel [i]. (Riesenberg & Kaneshiro (1960) call the glyphs at this stage of development "Type 2".) The glyphs were also mixed up somewhat: Although the letters resembling T, K, S, R, H, O, E, for example, stood for [ti, ki, si, ri, i, wo, ø] (there is no [h] sound in Woleaian), and W, И stood for [mi, ni] (that is, the letters M and N were inverted), letters resembling L, B, D stood for [fi, tʃi, pi]. (Note that these Latin letters are not necessary for Woleaian, since short [l] and long [nː] are not distinguished.)

Snelling died on Woleai on his way back to Chuuk. His crew continued, and at Faraulep the syllabary was augmented with glyphs that Riesenberg & Kaneshiro call "Type 1". At least some of these may have been rebuses. This extended syllabary spread back to the other islands.

When the next missionary, John Macmillan Brown, reached Woleai in 1913, he found an indigenous writing system, albeit one known to only a few people. A chief named Egilimar showed it to him, and Brown published a list of 51 glyphs in 1914 that included V, CV, CVV, CCV, and CVC syllables.

== Unicode ==
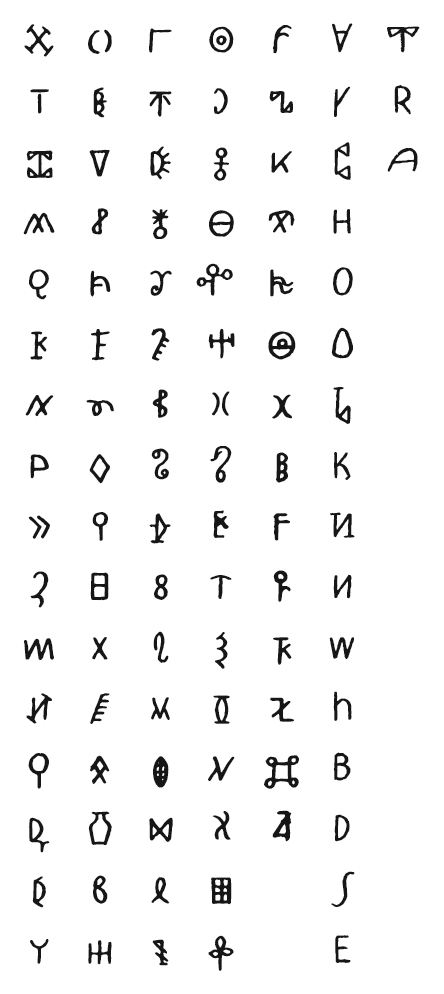
The characters proposed for Unicode as of 2008.

Preliminary proposals have been made to add Woleai script to Unicode. They propose 97 characters. These constituted an incomplete set of the V and CV syllables of the script. No CCV or CVC syllables are included.

== See also ==
- Rongorongo
- Avoiuli
- Caroline Islands
