= Woleaian language =

Language in Yap, Micronesia

Woleaian
- Native to: Federated States of Micronesia
- Region: Woleai
- Native speakers: (1,600 cited 1987 census)
- Language family: Austronesian: Malayo-Polynesian; Oceanic; Micronesian; Nuclear Micronesian; Chuukic; Ulithian–Woleaian; Woleaian
- Writing system: Latin, formerly Woleaian syllabary

Official status
- Official language in: Federated States of Micronesia

Language codes
- ISO 639-3: woe
- Glottolog: wole1240
- ELP: Woleaian
- Woleaian is classified as Severely Endangered by the UNESCO Atlas of the World's Languages in Danger.

Woleaian is the main language of the island of Woleai and surrounding smaller islands in the state of Yap of the Federated States of Micronesia. Woleaian is a Chuukic language. Within that family, its closest relative is Satawalese, with which it is largely mutually intelligible. Woleaian is spoken by approximately 1700 people. Woleai has a writing system of its own, a syllabary based on the Latin alphabet.

== Introduction ==
=== History ===
Most Woleaian speakers or Woleaians as they are more commonly known as are mostly found in the Federated States of Micronesia, and the Central and Eastern Caroline Islands. More specifically most of the speakers are found in Yap State in Micronesia where Woleaian is considered an official language. Most Woleaian speakers are classified as Pacific Islanders and Micronesian (People-In-Country Profile). The island of Yap is broken up into two parts: Yap Proper, which is made up of Gagil, Tomil, Fanif, Weloy, and Rull—and the Yap Outer Islands, which is made up of Ulithi, Faris/Sorol, Ngulu, Woleai, Eauripik, Ifalik, Faraulap, Elato, Lamotrek and Satawal. Aside from Woleaian, many speakers in Yap and other nearby places speak other languages, like Yapese, Satawalese, Ulithian, English, Chuukese, Kosraean, Pingelapese, Pohnpeian, Mwoakilloan, and some Asian and Polynesian Languages. The Woleaian language and culture is very important to the Woleaian people, as well as their history. The Woleaian history is passed down from generation to generation by storytelling. By doing so this helps to keep their language alive. As well as passing down their history, they also pass down their music, which is important to them. An important part of their culture is their clothing. Their clothing is so important to them that they have strict rules against wearing any type of western clothing. They also enjoy using canoes to get around instead of motorboats, and simple things like beautiful beaches and going fishing. They also enjoy working and spending time with their family and friends.

=== Population ===
In 1987, a Yap Census was taken and reported that there were about 1,630 people speaking the language. 13 years later when the census was taken in 2000 there was an increase of speakers and about 5,000 people were speaking or knew the language. Of these 5,000 speakers about 4,500 of them spoke Woleaian as their first language and 500 of them as their second language.

=== Classification ===
Woleaian is classified as an:

- Austronesian
  - Malayo-Polynesian
    - Central-Eastern Malayo-Polynesian
      - Eastern Malayo-Polynesian
        - Oceanic
          - Central-Eastern Oceanic
            - Remote Oceanic
              - Micronesian
                - Micronesian Proper
                  - Chuukic-Pohnpeic
                    - Chuukic language (Woleaian)

== Phonology ==
Woleaian has geminate (long) consonants and vowels.

In the orthography of Sohn (1975), along with a few approximations in the IPA, the inventory is,

Consonants
		Labial		Alveolar	Retroflex	Palatal	Velar
		plain	labialized	Alveolar	Retroflex	Palatal	Velar
Plosive	plain	p ⟨p⟩		t ⟨t⟩		tʃ ⟨ch⟩	
Plosive	geminate	pː ⟨pp⟩	pːʷ ⟨bb⟩	tː ⟨tt⟩			kː ⟨k⟩
Fricative	plain	f ⟨f⟩	ɸʷ ⟨b⟩	s ⟨s⟩	ʂ ⟨sh⟩		x ⟨g⟩
Fricative	geminate	fː ⟨ff⟩		sː ⟨ss⟩			
Nasal	plain	m ⟨m⟩	mʷ ⟨mw⟩	n ⟨n⟩			ŋ ⟨ng⟩
Nasal	geminate	mː ⟨mm⟩	mːʷ ⟨mmw⟩	nː ⟨nn⟩			
Rhotic				ɾ ⟨l⟩	ɻ ⟨r⟩		
Semivowel			w ⟨w⟩			j ⟨y⟩	

Note that both sh and r become ch when long, and that l becomes nn.

Vowels
	Front		Central		Back	
	short	long	short	long	short	long
Close	i ⟨i⟩	iː ⟨ī⟩	ʉ ⟨iu⟩	ʉː ⟨īū⟩	u ⟨u⟩	uː ⟨ū⟩
Mid	e ⟨e⟩	eː ⟨ē⟩		ɵː ⟨eo⟩	o ⟨o⟩	oː ⟨ō⟩
Open			a ⟨a⟩	aː ⟨ā⟩		ɔː ⟨oa⟩

Vowels occur long and short, except for eo and oa, which are only found long.

All simple vowels except a can occur as voiceless vowels in word-final position. (All simple vowels can also occur as word-final voiced vowels.) Though these voiceless vowels are generally not spelled out by native speakers, they represent an important change in pronunciation between words which are otherwise spelled the same. For example:

- besh [beshi̥] "hot"
- besh [beshe̥] "lime"
- yalius [yaliusi̥u̥] "ghost"
- yalius [yaliuse̥] "beard"
- lamw [lamwu̥] "mosquito"
- lamw [lamwo̥] "lagoon"

=== Syllable structure ===
In the Woleaian language words can have anywhere from one to three consonants in a row. Words may either have CV, CCV, CCCV, or VV syllable structures, and words can end in consonants.

== Grammar ==
=== Word formation ===
==== Inflectional patterns ====
There are four inflectional paradigms in Woleaian: possessive, objective, progressive, and plural.

===== Possessive =====
These suffixes, attached to nouns, convey the person and number of a possessor. There are seven regular possessive suffixes and one defective possessive suffix.

Regular
		singular		plural	
1st	excl.	-i	'my'	-mam	'our (excl.)'
1st	incl.	-i	'my'	-sh	'our (incl.)'
2nd		-mw	'your'	-mi	'your (pl.)'
3rd		-l	'his, her, its'	-r	'their'

The "defective" suffix is always followed by a noun, unlike regular possessive suffixes. It is equivalent to his genitive.

Defective
Suffix	Meaning	Person	Number
-l	'of'	3rd	singular or plural

Examples:

- metal 'his eyes'
- metal John 'eyes of John'
- metaar 'their eyes'
- metal John me Mary 'eyes of John and Mary'

===== Object =====
These suffixes occur with all transitive verbs and show person, number, and animateness of the object of that verb.

		singular		plural	
1st	excl.	-yai, -yei, -wai, -wei	'me'	-gemam	'us (excl.)'
1st	incl.	-yai, -yei, -wai, -wei	'me'	-gish	'us (incl.)'
2nd		-g	'you'	-gami	'you (pl.)'
3rd	animate	-ɸ, -y, -w	'him, her, it'	-r	'them'
3rd	inanimate	-ɸ, -y, -w	'him, her, it'	-n	'them'

===== Progressive =====
Progressive action is shown in Woleaian through reduplication of initial parts of verbs. For example: mil "to stay" becomes mimmil "to be staying."

===== Plural =====
Plurality of nouns is generally left up to context, but the plural marker ka is added when nouns are accompanied by a demonstrative pronoun.

=== Basic word order ===
Woleaian has many different sentences types—and the type of sentence determines the word order. The first types of sentences are major and minor sentences. Major sentences are expressions that contain a subject and a predicate. Within a major sentence it can be broken up into two types, simple and complex sentences. Simple major sentences have a subject associated with a predicate. In a simple major sentence, the subject and predicates are interchangeable—so sometimes the subject comes first, and sometimes the predicate comes first. Simple major sentences can then be broken up into either equational or predicative. In an equational sentence the subject always follows the predicate, whether a question or statement. In predicative sentences, a subject or noun phrase usually follows a predicate. Two or more simple sentences together within one sentence produces a complex major sentence. Complex major sentences can either be coordinative or subordinative. Minor sentences are without "...a subject, a predicate, or both, but still express a complete thought." Just as major sentence can be divided into two types, so can minor sentences. Some refer back to the context and complete it, (completive), and some that appear independently, (exclamatory). The problem with equational and predicative statement and question sentences in Woleaian is that you cannot differentiate between the question and statement based on how the words are arranged. An example of this:

- Equational sentence: Iiy semal sar skuul, which can translate to "He is a student" or "is he a student?"
- Predicative sentence: Go weri saw we, which can translate to "You saw the child" or "Did you see the child?"

=== Reduplication ===
Many words in Woleaian, especially verbs, use reduplication. They use both whole stem and partial reduplications "as initial or medial consonant doubling and initial or final reduplication". An example of this is the word fiyefiy, which means to squeeze and comes from the word fiya, which means squeeze it. Some nouns also use reduplication, like ugoug or gallbladder, which reduplicates the word ug for net. Reduplication in Woleaian can be found in adjectives—like the word yangoyang, meaning to be yellow, yellowish of ginger color, which comes from the word yang, which means ginger. Another type of reduplication in Woleaian is reduplication-prefixation, which is when "a neutral verb has both reduplication and the causative prefix/". An example of this is the Woleaian word gareparep, which means to get close. This word comes from the words garepa meaning approach to it, and rep, meaning to be near.

== Vocabulary ==
=== Indigenous vocabulary ===
- file-file means 'to stir'
- fitiye-tiye means 'to marry'
- maŋi-meŋi means 'to remember'
- masowe-sowe means 'to be strong'
- lewe-lewe means 'to lick'
- perase-rase means 'to scatter'
- gofeti-feti means 'to chip off'
- gare-gare means 'to broil'
- mmwutu means 'to vomit'
- cago means 'to hug'

=== Loanwords ===
Many loanwords in Woleaian come from Spanish, Japanese and English.

Words from Spanish:

- baarekow from barco ('ship')
- filooras from flores ('flower')
- karebau from carabao ('carabao' in Spanish, 'cow' in Woleaian)

Words from Japanese:

- geitei comes from the Japanese word heitai ('soldier')
- koori comes from the Japanese word koori ('ice')
- koomaru comes from the Japanese word komaru ('to be in trouble')
- meeteto comes from the Japanese word omedetou ('congratulations/happy holidays' in Japanese; 'New Year' in Woleaian)
- taiko comes from the Japanese word taiko (drum)

Words from English:

- felaaki means 'flag'
- feraipaang means 'fry pan'
- iinch means 'inch'
- kolook means 'clock'
- mariiken means 'America'
- baibai means 'papaya'

== Endangerment ==
=== Materials ===
There are many resources on the Woleaian language—including books, websites, research papers, and even YouTube videos. Two books in particular are helpful in learning about the Woleaian language: the Woleaian Reference Grammar book by Ho-Min Sohn, and a Woleaian–English Dictionary by Ho-Min Sohn and Anthony Tawerilmang. These two books contain much information about the Woleaian language, such as the sentence structures, types of reduplication, vocabulary, etc. Many websites contain useful information. The 2000 Yap Census also provides information about the language and speakers. A few research papers are helpful as well. One by Tsz-him Tsui from the University of Hawaii at Manoa describes the Woleaian vocabulary and phonemes. A paper by Robert Kennedy from the University of Arizona is about Woleaian reduplication. Lastly, a YouTube channel provides Woleaian videos. Some of the videos are of church services, cultural dances similar to the hula, and Woleaian people singing Woleaian songs.

=== Vitality ===
Woleaian, under the Expanded Graded Intergenerational Disruption Scale (EGIDS, which determines the status of a language, is level five, a developing language. This means that it "is in vigorous use, with literature in a standardized form being used by some people, though it is not yet widespread or sustainable." From the rapid growth of Woleaian in 1987 to 2000 it is pretty safe to say that Woleaian is being transmitted and taught to young children. There is intergenerational transmission involved in Woleaian because of its language status on the EGIDS. It is described as a developing language in vigorous use—which means that the Woleaian speakers must pass it down from generation to generation.
