= Satawalese language =

Micronesian language

Satawalese
- Native to: Federated States of Micronesia
- Region: Caroline Islands
- Native speakers: 500 (2016)
- Language family: Austronesian: Malayo-Polynesian; Oceanic; Micronesian; Nuclear Micronesian; Chuukic; Satawalese–Mortlockese; Satawalese

Language codes
- ISO 639-3: stw
- Glottolog: sata1237
- ELP: Satawalese
- Satawalese is classified as Severely Endangered by the UNESCO Atlas of the World's Languages in Danger

Satawalese is a Micronesian language of the Federated States of Micronesia. It is nearly mutually intelligible with Mortlockese and Carolinian.

== Introduction ==
=== History ===
Satawalese is spoken on the island of Satawal, located in the Federated States of Micronesia. The language is also spoken in Yap State, nearby atolls and islands such as Lamotrek, Woleai, Puluwat, Pulusuk, and Chuuk State. Smaller populations of speakers can also be found in Saipan, the Commonwealth of the Northern Mariana Islands, and some parts of the United States. According to a 1987 census, Satawalese is spoken by approximately 460 people however this number has grown, according to a count taken by researcher Kevin Roddy who reported for about 700 speakers in 2007.

=== Classification ===
Satawalese is identified as an Austronesian language and is a member of the Chuukic language subgroup. Discovered by scholar Edward Quackenbush, the Chuukic subgroup is a dialect chain composed of a variety of about 17 different languages and dialects extending 2,100 kilometres (1,300 mi) across the western Pacific (Roddy, 2007). This chain begins at Chuuk in the east and stretches towards Sonsorol in the west. In the center of this dialect continuum lies Satawalese. Using the comparative method, which involves the observation of vocabulary and sound correspondence similarities, linguists were able to link Satawalese as well as its sister languages to the Chuukic language family. Sister languages of Satawalese include Carolinian, Chuukese, Mapia, Mortlockese, Namonuito, Paafang, Puluwatese, Sonsorol, Tanapag, Tobian, Ulithian, and Woleaian.

== Phonology ==
=== Consonants ===
Satawalese contains 15 specific consonants.

	Labial	Dental/ Alveolar	Post- alveolar	Dorsal
Nasal	m, mʷˠ	n		ŋ
Occlusive	p, pʷˠ	t	t͡ʃ	k
Fricative	f	s		
Sonorant	w	r	ɻ	j

The existence of the phoneme /g/ is debatable. Some scholars believe the phoneme to be an allophone of the phoneme /k/. It is suggested that in Satawalese language both phonemes can be interchanged without changing the meaning of a word. Opposing studies suggest /g/ to be its own separate phoneme. Because of evidence that shows use of /g/ on its own within Satawalese speech, the suggestion that it is its own phoneme has a stronger stance.

The phoneme /l/ has been identified as an allophone for the phoneme /n/ due to influence of surrounding languages. /l/ is not included in the Satawalese phoneme inventory but is a part of similar languages close in proximity. This phone is understood to convey the same meanings that phoneme /n/ will produce but in surrounding languages there are cases where roles cannot be reversed; /l/ will be able to take the place of /n/ but /n/ cannot take the place of /l/.

=== Vowels ===
Satawalese contains nine vowels: /i/, /a/, /o/, /u/, /æ/, /ɛ/, /ʉ/, /ɞ/, /ɒ/.

== Grammar ==
=== Basic word order ===
Satawalese use Subject-Object-Verb word order.

Mary a foato-ki tinikii we aan
"Mary wrote her letter."

=== Reduplication ===
Reduplication is available in the Satawalese language. It is used mainly to show a progressive form of a verb, noun, or adjective.

- "ras" vt. to pull something until it breaks.

- "rasras" vt. progressive form of ras; the continuous pulling of something until it breaks

- "rig" adj. small.

- "rigrig" adj. progressive form of rig; smaller.

- "seo" rested.

- "seoseo" v. resting.

- "pis" n. splash.

- "pisipis" adj. progressive form of pis; 'splashing around'.

=== Numerals ===
Like most Pacific languages as well as many languages around the world, Satawalese takes advantage of a base ten counting system. The Satawalese language contains two basic counting systems (Roddy, 2007). One system is the fast version, which is the version used for counting objects as well as game playing. The second counting system in Satawal is the slow version. This system is used when teaching young children the numeral system, and is also used by older generations.

Slow version Fast version English translation

- ‘’Eota’’ *‘’Eot’’ one
- ‘’Riuwa’’ *‘’Riuw’’ two
- ‘’Eoniu’’ *‘’Eon’’ three
- ‘’Faeni’’ *‘’Faen’’ four
- ‘’Nima’’ *‘’Nim’’ five
- ‘’Wona’’ *‘’On’’ six
- ‘’Fiusa’’ *‘’Fius’’ seven
- ‘’Waani’’ *‘’Wan’’ eight
- ‘’Tiwa*‘’Tiw’’ nine

Large numbers are also existent in the Satawalese language. All numbers greater than ten are produced by using the conjunction me, which translates to the word "and" in English. For example, the numeral eleven is seig me ew, which translates to "ten and one" in English or eleven. One billion is the largest numeral in the Satawalese language. It is expressed as engeras ssen or one thousand million.

== Vocabulary ==
=== Indigenous vocabulary ===
- saam – father
- rheon – leaf
- pwun – heart
- oattoaur – to eat (polite form)
- moat – to sit
- manewe – person
- ig – fish
- kanok – dog
- kiuw – louse
- wanwan – tree
- aweri – to see
- mae – to die
- eito – to come
- rhan – water
- fai – stone
- rhug – mountain
- aenet – sun
- pai – hand
- fiufiu – star

=== Loanwords ===
Satawalese has borrowed words from major language countries that had traveled throughout the Pacific such as Japan, Spain, and the United States, as well as nearby languages within the Federated States of Micronesia, such as Woleaian and Ulithian.

Words derived from English:

- aispwoax – Ice box; refrigerator
- felowa – bread; flour
- finoras – flowers
- frii – free
- friiseor – freezer
- karesiin – kerosene

Words derived from Ulithian:

- aasi – to take (it)
- aaileng – world
- fiifi – soup
- kaerboaw – cow

Words derived from Spanish:

- floras – flowers
- kanemasa – pumpkin

Words derived from Japanese:

- kanepwas – calabash
- kachito – movie

Words derived from Woleaian:

- gamaeinoak – pretend
- faisun – as it is
- "ngang" – Me
- "Ito-come

== Endangerment ==
=== Materials ===
Satawalese language resources have become quite abundant in the past decade. Alphabet books, translations, as well as dictionaries are all available in the Satawalese language. Also linguistic studies have been documented sharing the language's grammar, phonology, vocabulary, stories, etc.

=== Vitality ===
According to endangeredlanguages.com Satawalese is classified as an endangered language. However, the language Satawalese shows much promise for the future. Satawalese is spoken as an L1 by most of the population occupying the island of Satawal. It is also used throughout the Federated States of Micronesia as well as nearby states. Also, according to David Roddy the population of Satawalese speakers has grown to 700 in an accounting taken in 2007. Awareness of the island has been a current enhancement to the language due to the contributions made of voyager Mau Piailug who was known to have been the first navigator aboard the ship of the Hawaiian double-hulled canoe the Hokulea. With this discovery, interest in the island including the people, culture, and language have been uprooted, meaning more linguistic studies can be done, possibly more resources can be added, and so on. Finally, the Satawalese language documentation is outstanding. Dictionaries and alphabet books have been created allowing the transmission of the language to occur between older and younger generations.
