= Woleai =

Atoll in Yap State, Micronesia

Woleai Weleya
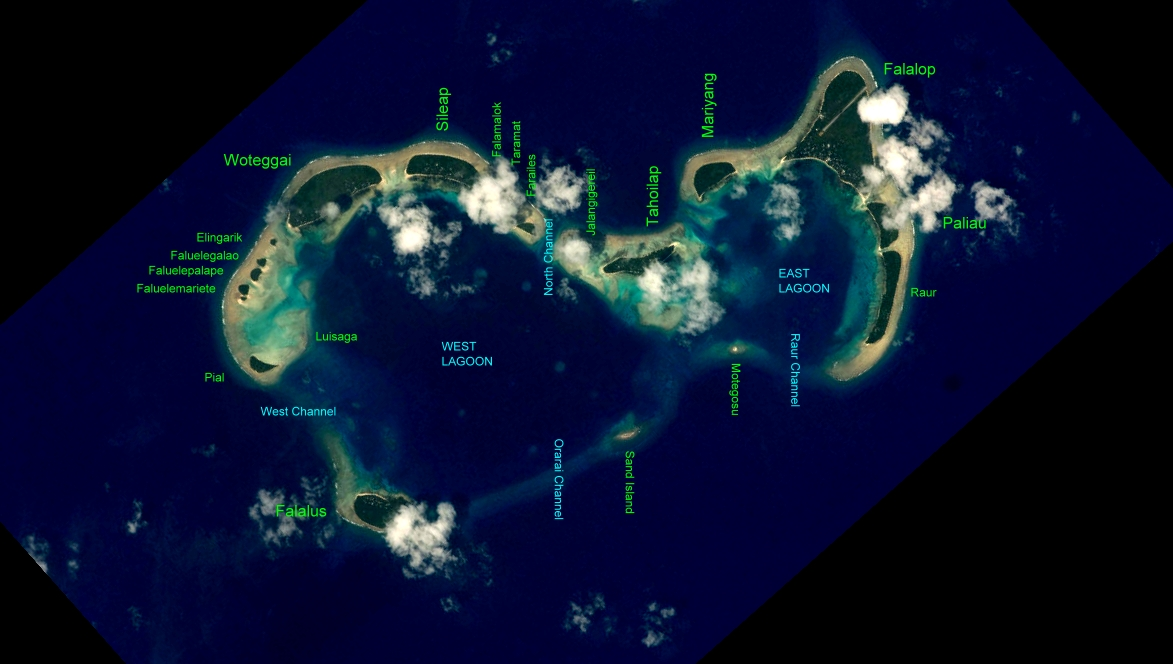
- NASA picture of Woleai Atoll

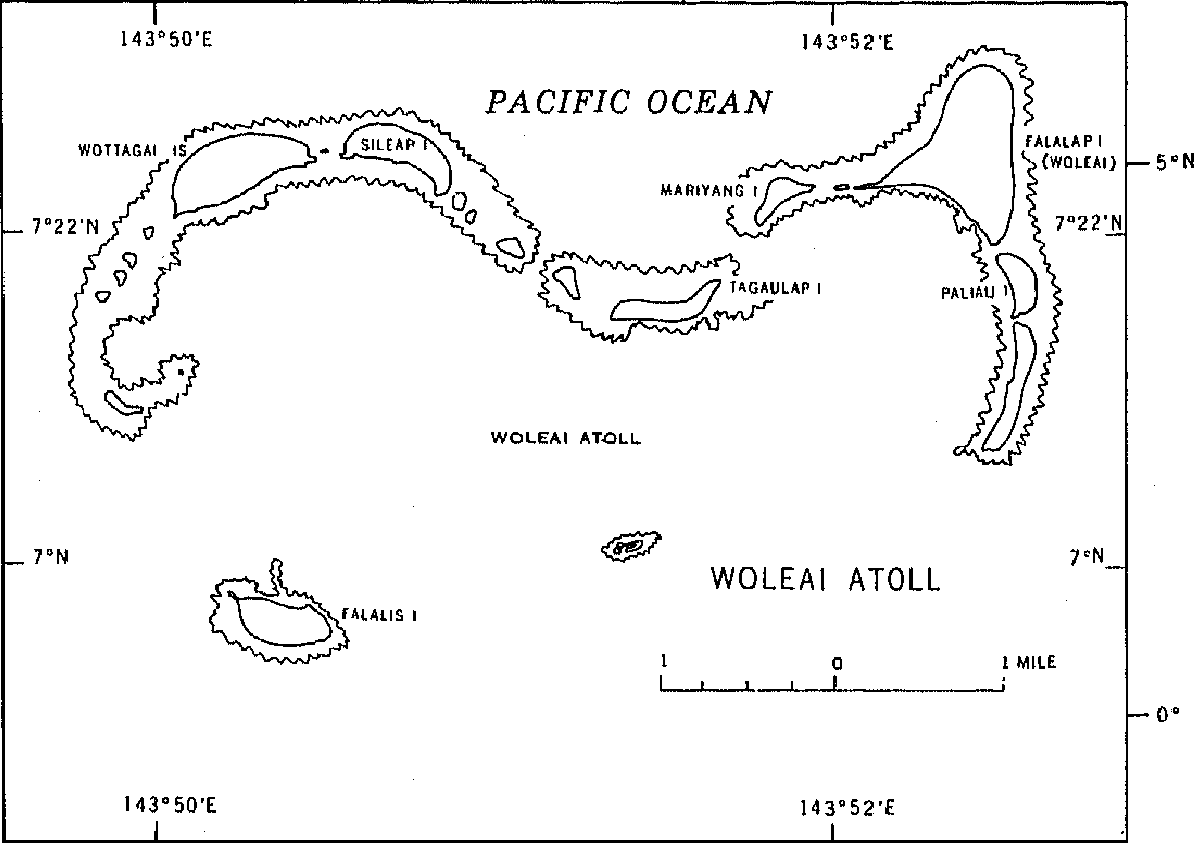
- Map of Woleai

- Location of Woleai in Yap State, Federated States of Micronesia

Geography
- Location: North Pacific
- Coordinates: 7°22′N 143°54′E
- Archipelago: Caroline
- Total islands: 18
- Area: 4.5 km^{2} (1.7 sq mi)
- Highest elevation: 2 m (7 ft)

Administration
- Federated States of Micronesia
- State: Yap

Demographics
- Demonym: Woleaian
- Population: 1081 (2000)
- Ethnic groups: Micronesian

Woleai (Woleaian: Weleya), also known as Oleai, is a coral atoll of 22 islands in the western Caroline Islands in the Pacific Ocean, forming a legislative district in the Yap State in the Federated States of Micronesia, and located approximately 57 kilometers (35 mi; 31 nmi) west-northwest of Ifalik and 108 kilometers (67 mi; 58 nmi) northeast of Eauripik. Woleai is also the name of the largest of the islets constituting the atoll, lying to the northeast.

The population of the atoll was 1,081 in 2000, on an area of 4.5 km^{2}.

== Geography ==
The islands constitute a double atoll forming the number eight, with a total length of 11.5 kilometers (7.1 mi; 6.2 nmi) and up to 7 kilometers (4.3 mi; 3.8 nmi) wide; however, most of reef on the southern rim is submerged or poorly developed. The northern and eastern rims have several relatively large islets. The western lagoon is deeper and larger than its eastern counterpart. Both components are part of the same seamount. The total land area for both components combined is only 4.5 square kilometers (1.7 sq mi).

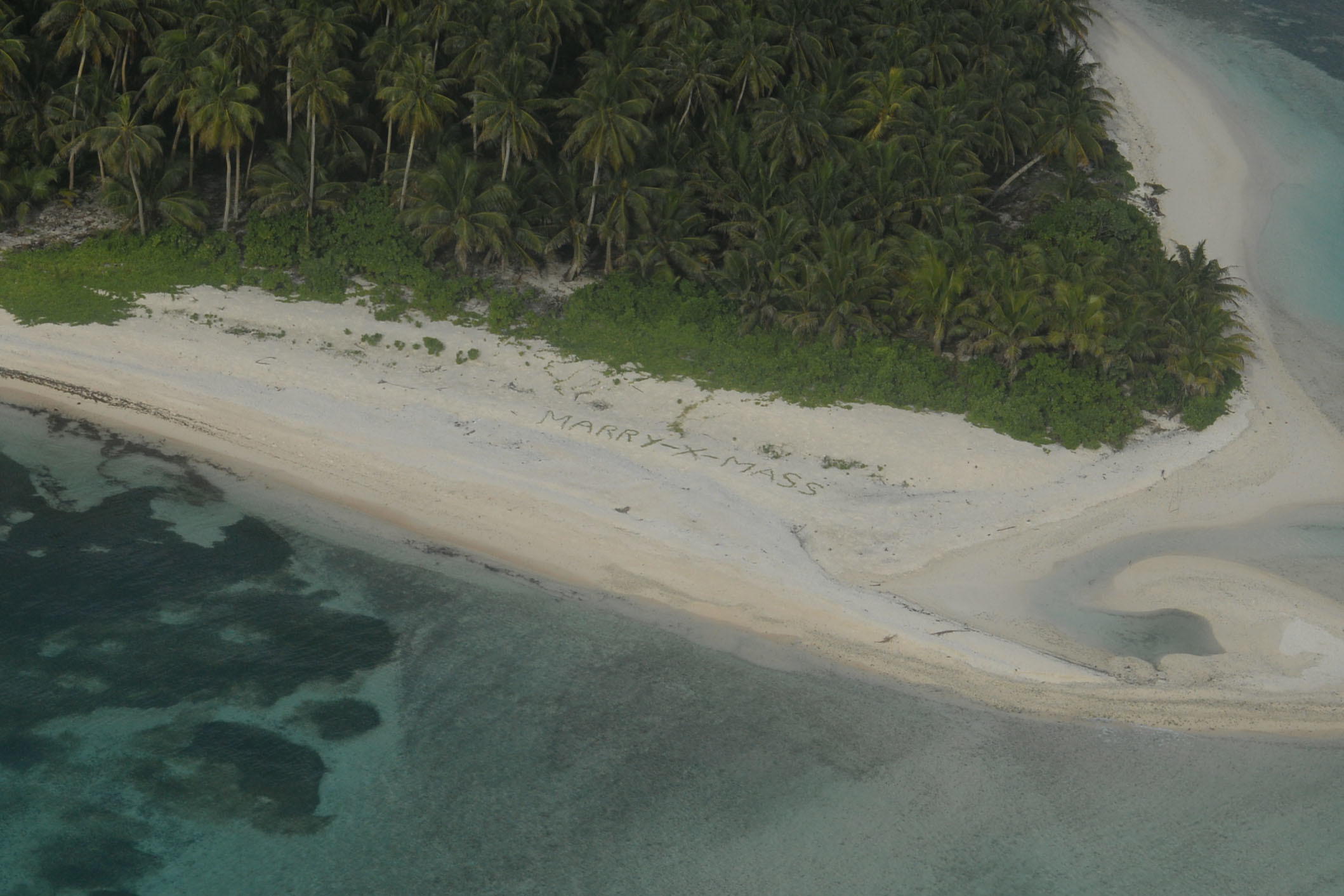
Falalap, Woleai Atoll

== History ==
The Austronesian ancestors of the Micronesians who make up the indigenous population of the Caroline Islands arrived in the islands c. 0-200 CE. Woleai subsequently became culturally unique among the Caroline Islands because of a script in use among some speakers of the Woleaian language prior to 1913. Woleai was among islands to the southeast of Yap that became tributaries of the Yapese Empire from about 1500 CE.

Woleai came under the control of the Spanish Empire in 1686, governed along with the rest of the Caroline Islands as part of the Spanish East Indies. During this time in the early 1800s a Woleaian Chief and Navigator named Kadu gave information to a Captain named Otto von Kotzebue concerning the Caroline Islands. Spain sold the islands to the German Empire in 1899. In 1914, in the early weeks of World War I, the Empire of Japan seized German possessions in the Pacific, including Woleai. Assigned a League of Nations mandate to administer the islands after the war in accordance with the Treaty of Versailles of 1919, Japan subsequently administered Woleai under the South Seas Mandate.

In 1944, as Allied forces closed in on the Mariana Islands during World War II, a contingent of 6,426 troops from the Imperial Japanese Army's 50th Independent Mixed Brigade and the Imperial Japanese Navy's 44th Base Guard Unit and 216th Base Construction Unit heavily fortified Woleai. They completely leveled Wolfe Islet and made it into an airfield with a single 3,290-foot (1,003 m) runway and 2,050-foot (625 m) taxiway. They also constructed a seaplane anchorage off the southwest corner of Woleai Islet and established a weather station on Mariaon island to the west. Allied aircraft bombed the atoll and its military facilities on numerous occasions until the middle of 1945, driving its defenders underground and isolating them from supplies or reinforcements. By the surrender of Japan on September 2, 1945, only 1,650 survivors remained of the initial 6,426-strong Japanese garrison, the rest having perished largely because of starvation and disease rather than directly in Allied air raids. The United States Navy destroyer escort USS Sloat (DE-245) picked up the surviving Japanese on September 17, 1945.

Following World War II, the atoll came under the control of the United States. The United States administered Woleai as part of the Trust Territory of the Pacific Islands, a United Nations trust territory, from 1947 until 1979, when Woleai became part of the independent Federated States of Micronesia.

== Education ==
Public school:

- Woleai High School

== Transportation ==
Woleai Airfield
- IATA: none; ICAO: none

Summary
- Airport type: Public
- Owner: Government
- Operator: Civil Government
- Serves: ~~Woleai~~
- Interactive map of Woleai Airfield

Runways
Direction	Length		Surface
Direction	ft	m	Surface
	3,000	914	concrete

Woleai Civil Airfield, administered by the Federated States of Micronesia Division of Civil Aviation is located at an altitude of 2 meters (6 ft 7 in) on Falalap at 7.37666°N 143.90833°E, 681 kilometers (423 mi; 368 nmi) southeast of Yap International Airport and 0.44 kilometers (0.27 mi) northeast of the main settlements on the island. The 1,200-foot (370 m) runway had not been maintained since 1992, and the airfield was closed due to severe deterioration of the runway and the government's decision not to perform repairs. The runway has since been renovated with a new terminal building in a major congresssional-backed project that broke ground in May 2025. Before the airfield closed, Caroline Islands Air provided chartered flights to it. Currently, PMA flies on-demand and special charters to Woleai.

The runway was built by the Empire of Japan during World War II. After the war it was shortly US Naval Base Woleai, Fleet Post Office #3246.

== Religion ==
Roman Catholicism is the main religion practiced. However there is still possibly belief in the traditional religion of the area. Christianity became the main practice in the area in the 1950s.

== See also ==
- US Naval Base Carolines
