= Gagil =

Municipality in Yap, Federated States of Micronesia

Coordinates: 9°31′N 138°09′E

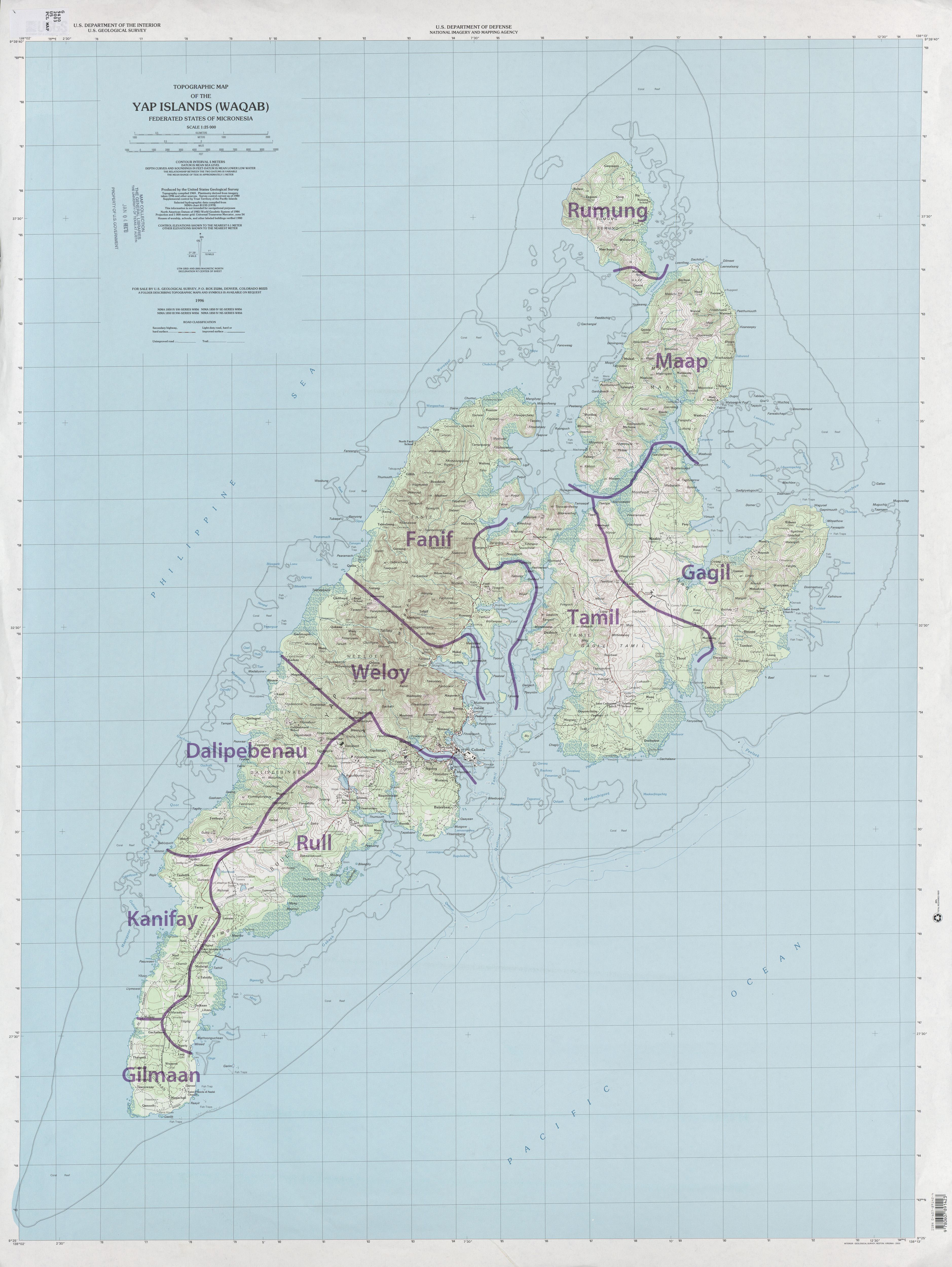
Map of the municipalities of Yap including Gagil

Gagil (Yapese: Gagil, dialect Ggil) is a municipality in the state of Yap, in the Federated States of Micronesia. It forms part of Gagil-Tamil Island and covers the eastern side of the island. It has a population of roughly 400 people scattered in village groups. One of these villages includes the village of Gachpar which was once the capital of the historic Yap Islands Empire that lasted from about 10th to the 15th century AD and stretched as far as east as the west halls of Chuuk Lagoon, as far south as the northern atolls of Papua New Guinea, and as far west as the outer islands of Palau.
