= Elato =

Pacific atoll in Yap State, Federated States of Micronesia

Elato Yelaat
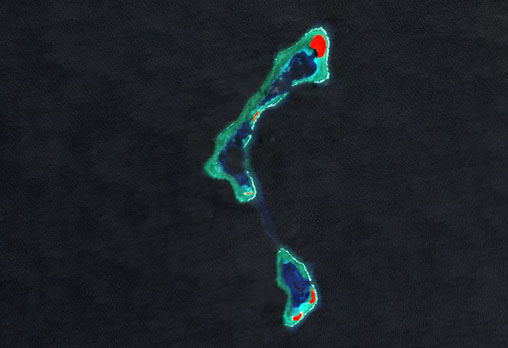
- NASA picture of Elato Atoll

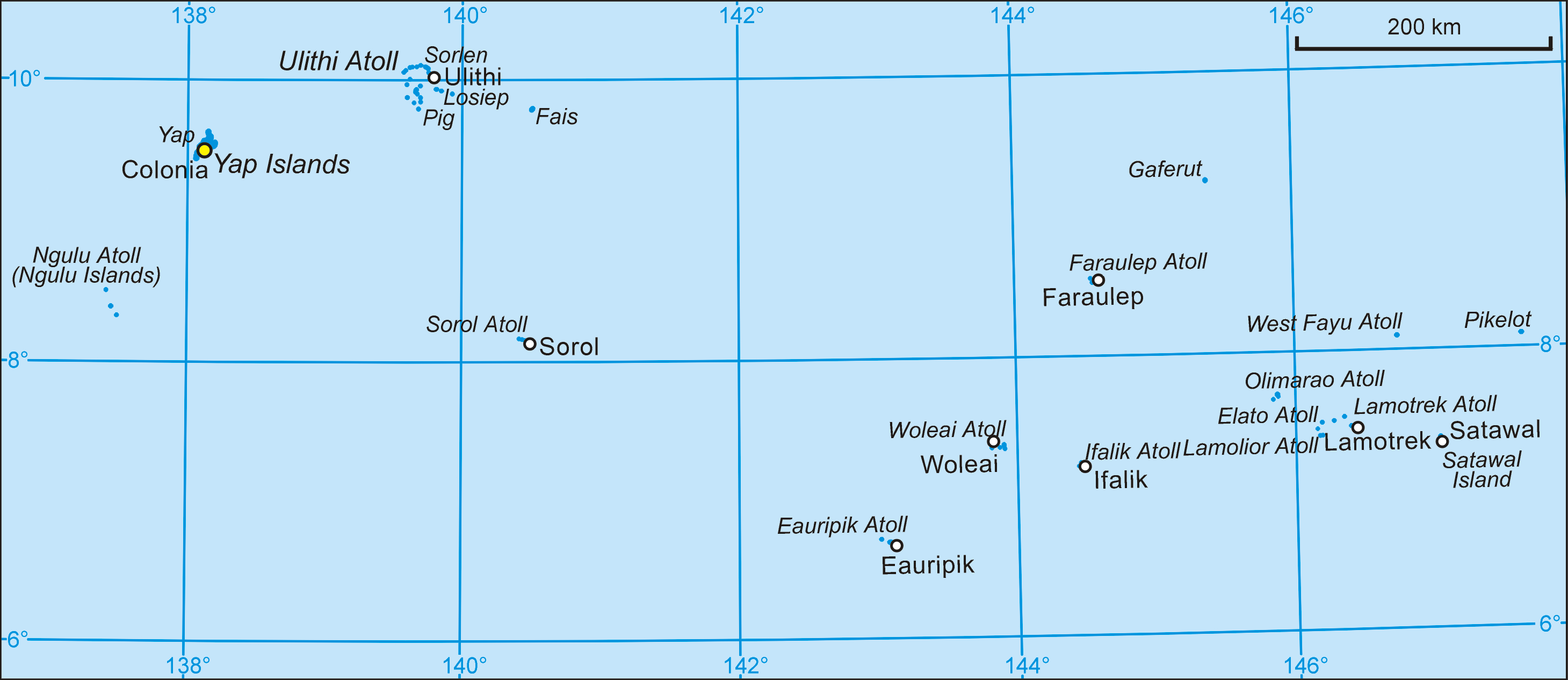

Geography
- Location: North Pacific
- Coordinates: 7°29′N 146°09′E
- Archipelago: Caroline
- Total islands: 3
- Area: 0.526 km^{2} (0.203 sq mi)
- Highest elevation: 2 m (7 ft)

Administration
- Federated States of Micronesia

Demographics
- Population: 96 (2000)
- Ethnic groups: Micronesian

Location of Elato in the Pacific Ocean

Elato (Woleaian: Yelaat) is a coral atoll of three islands in the central Caroline Islands in the Pacific Ocean, and forms a legislative district in Yap State in the Federated States of Micronesia. It is located approximately 10 kilometers (6.2 mi) west of Lamotrek. Its population was 96 in 2000, living on 0.5 km^{2} (0.19 sq mi).

== Geography ==
The island is a double atoll with a total length of 14 kilometers (8.7 mi), and up to 2 kilometers (1.2 mi) wide. The northern component, called Elato, contains two lagoons and three islets. It is connected to the southern component, called Lamolior, by a narrow submarine ridge. Lamolior has two islets. Both components are part of the same seamount. The total land area for both components combined is only 0.526 square kilometers (0.203 sq mi). Nearby Olimarao Atoll belongs administratively to Elato.

== History ==
As with all of the Caroline Islands, sovereignty passed to the Empire of Germany in 1899. The island came under the control of the Empire of Japan after World War I, and was subsequently administered under the South Seas Mandate. Following World War II, the island came under the control of the United States of America and was administered as part of the Trust Territory of the Pacific Islands from 1947, and became part of the Federated States of Micronesia from 1979.
