= Lamotrek =

Islands in Federated States of Micronesia

Lamotrek Lamwocheg
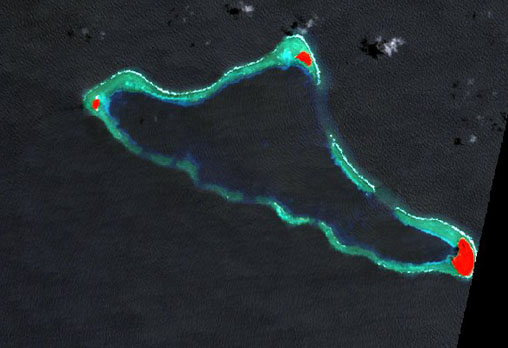
- NASA picture with the three islands in red

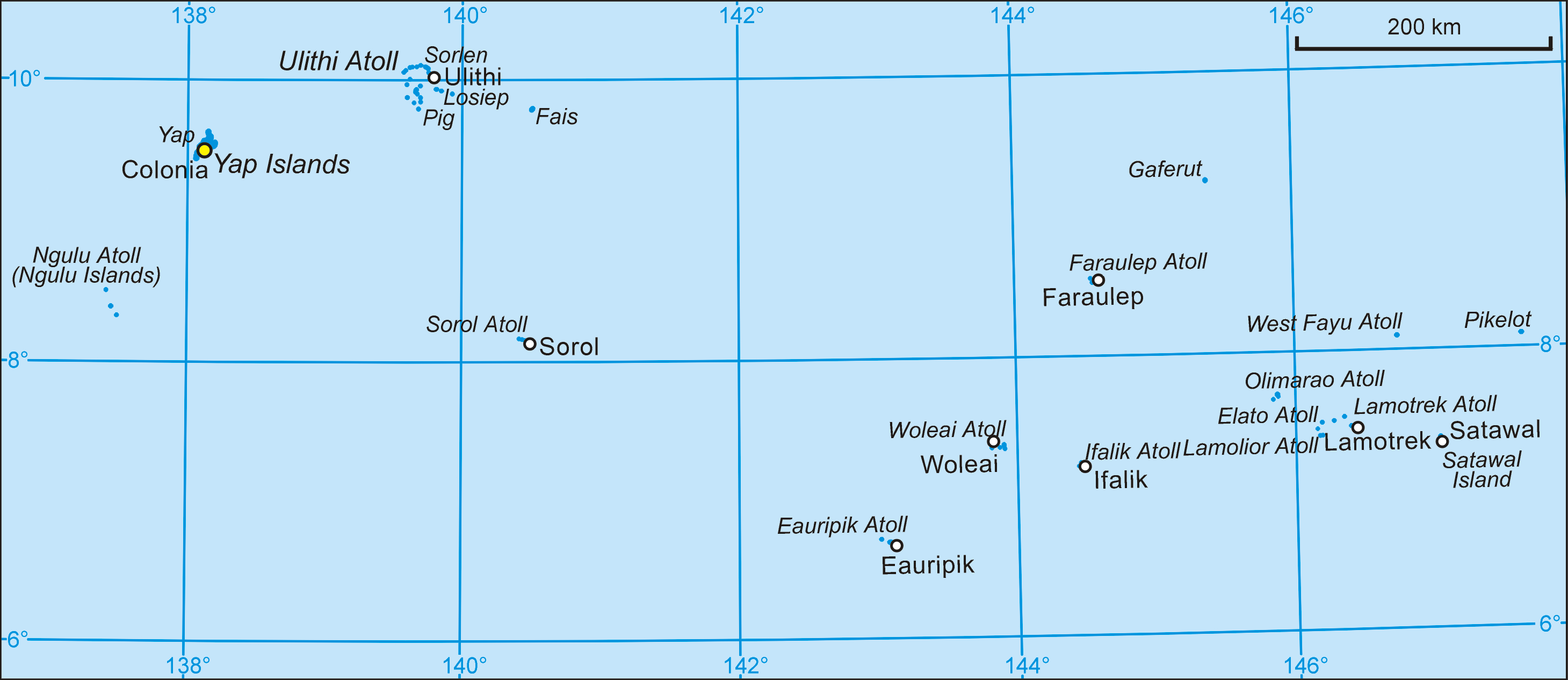

Geography
- Location: North Pacific
- Coordinates: 7°29′N 146°20′E
- Archipelago: Caroline
- Total islands: 3
- Area: 0.982 km^{2} (0.379 sq mi)
- Highest elevation: 2 m (7 ft)

Administration
- Federated States of Micronesia

Demographics
- Population: 373 (2000)
- Ethnic groups: Micronesian

Location of Lamotrek in the Pacific Ocean

Lamotrek (Woleaian: Lamwocheg) is a coral atoll of three islands in the central Caroline Islands in the Pacific Ocean, and forms a legislative district in Yap State in the Federated States of Micronesia. The atoll is located approximately 11 kilometers (6.8 mi) east of Elato. The population of Lamotrek was 373 in 2000, living on almost 1 km^{2}.

== Name ==
The name of the island possibly goes back to Proto-Chuukic *lamʷo-li-ragi "lagoon of the west".

== Geography ==
The atoll is 11.5 kilometers (7.1 mi) long northeast-southeast, and up to 6.5 kilometers (4.0 mi) wide. Its total land area is only 0.982 square kilometers (0.379 sq mi), but it encloses a lagoon of 32 square kilometers (12 sq mi).

Among the individual islets are the following:

- Falaite (northwest)
- Pugue (northeast)
- Lamotrek (southeast)

== History ==
Before European rule, Lamotrek was invaded by Ifalik during Mweoiush's reign, with aid from the Mailiyas.

In January 1849 an earthquake occurred causing a flood to submerge the island with the exception of some trees. People climbed trees to survive; the water however swept away even some who had climbed the trees, causing many in the village to die. Forty-one survivors came to the Marianas to permanently settle there in April of that year.

As with all of the Caroline Islands, sovereignty passed to the Empire of Germany in 1899. The island came under the control of the Empire of Japan after World War I, and was subsequently administered under the South Seas Mandate. Following World War II, the island came under the control of the United States of America and was administered as part of the Trust Territory of the Pacific Islands from 1947, and became part of the Federated States of Micronesia from 1979.
