= Eauripik =

Pacific atoll in Yap State, Federated States of Micronesia

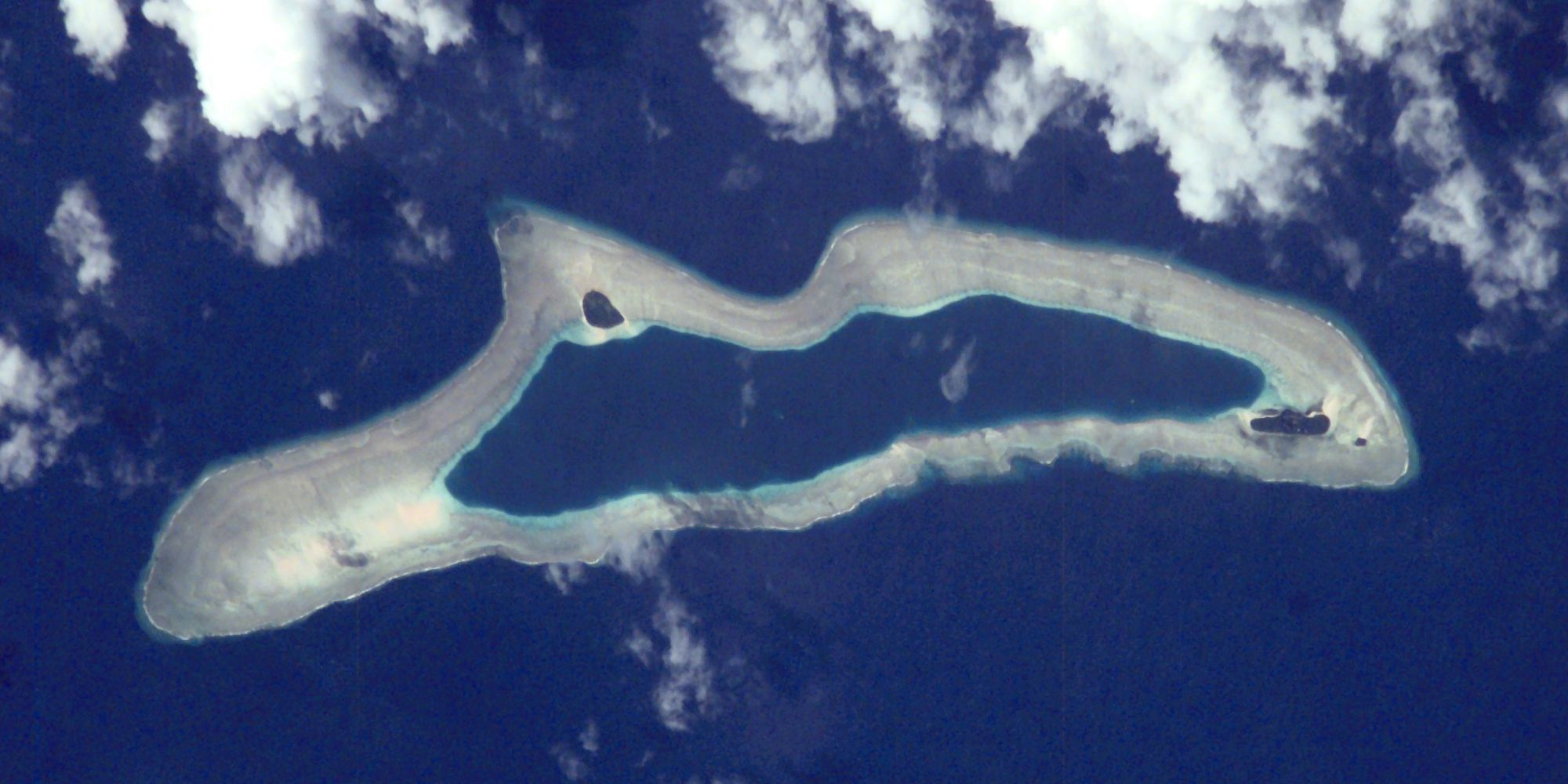
- NASA picture of Eauripik Atoll

- Location of Eauripik in Yap State, Federated States of Micronesia

Geography
- Location: North Pacific
- Coordinates: 06°41′30″N 143°2′30″E
- Archipelago: Caroline
- Total islands: 3
- Area: 0.236 km^{2} (0.091 sq mi)
- Highest elevation: 2 m (7 ft)

Administration
- Federated States of Micronesia
- State: Yap

Demographics
- Population: 113 (2000)
- Ethnic groups: Micronesian

Eauripik Island is a coral atoll of three islands in the western Caroline Islands in the Pacific Ocean. It forms a legislative district in Yap State in the Federated States of Micronesia. Its total land area is only 23.6 hectares, 0.236 square kilometers (0.091 sq mi). It encloses a deep lagoon of 5.921 square kilometers (2.286 sq mi). With light southwest winds, there are usually breakers on both sides of the atoll. All of the islets are covered with coconut palms. There used to be five islets. Two were washed away in the late 1970s by typhoon waves. Eauripik is located approximately 108 kilometers (67 mi) southwest of Woleai.

The population of Eauripik Island was 113 in 2000. Many islanders usually reside on the mainland Yap as temporary laborers.

The Caroline Islands' sovereignty passed to the Empire of Germany in 1899. The island came under the control of the Empire of Japan after World War I and was subsequently administered under the South Seas Mandate. Following World War II, the island came under the control of the United States. The islands were administered as part of the Trust Territory of the Pacific Islands from 1947 and became part of the Federated States of Micronesia from 1979.
