= Caroline Islands =

Archipelago in the Pacific Ocean

Native name: Islas Carolinas Nickname: New Philippines
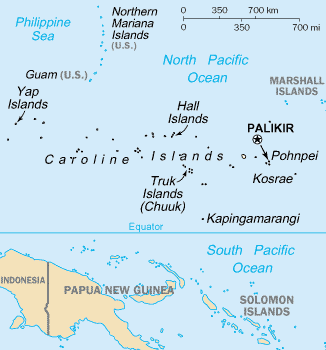
- Map of the Caroline Islands within the Federated States of Micronesia (Palauan islands not shown)

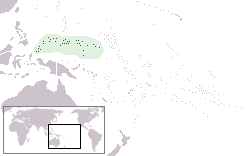
- Location of Caroline Islands in the Pacific

Geography
- Location: Western Pacific Ocean
- Coordinates: 7°22′57″N 147°2′15″E
- Archipelago: Micronesia
- Adjacent to: Pacific Ocean
- Total islands: 963
- Major islands: Yap, Chuuk, Pohnpei, Kosrae, Palau
- Area: 1,300 km^{2} (500 sq mi)
- Length: 3,540 km (2200 mi)
- Highest elevation: 791 m (2595 ft)
- Highest point: Dolohmwar, Pohnpei

Administration
- Federated States of Micronesia and Palau

Demographics
- Demonym: Carolinian
- Population: 125,000 (2024)
- Languages: Micronesian languages, English
- Ethnic groups: Micronesian, Filipino, Japanese

Additional information
- Time zone: UTC+9 (Palau), UTC+10, UTC+11
- Area and population estimates include Federated States of Micronesia and Palau

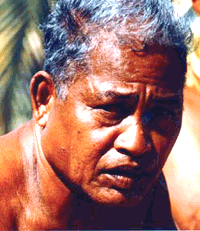
Navigator Mau Piailug (1932–2010) of Satawal island, Micronesia

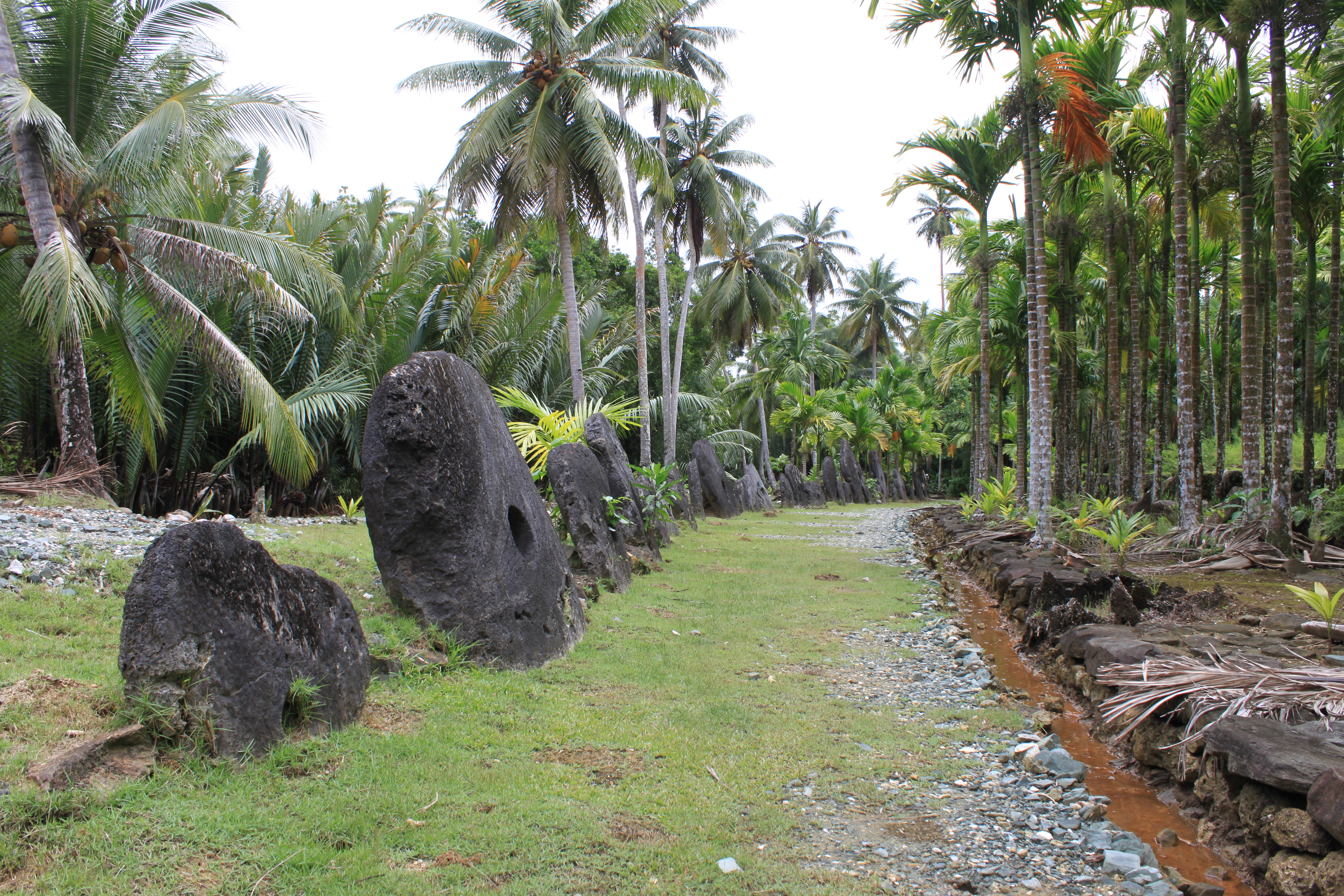
Rai stones on Yap

The Caroline Islands (or the Carolines) are a widely scattered archipelago of tiny islands in the western Pacific Ocean, to the north of New Guinea. Politically, they are divided between the Federated States of Micronesia (FSM) in the central and eastern parts of the group, and Palau at the extreme western end. Historically, this area was also called Nuevas Filipinas or New Philippines, because they were part of the Spanish East Indies and were governed from Manila in the Philippines.

The Carolines are scattered across a distance of approximately 3,540 kilometers (2,200 mi; 1,910 nmi), from the westernmost island, Tobi, in Palau, to the easternmost island, Kosrae, a state of the FSM.

== Description ==
The group consists of about 500 small coral islands, east of the Philippines, in the Pacific Ocean. The distance from Yap (one of the larger Caroline islands) to Manila is 1,200 mi (1,900 km).

Most of the islands are made up of low, flat coral atolls, but there are some that rise high above sea level.

== Islands of the Carolines ==
Some of the individual islands which make up the Carolines include - Yap, Chuuk (Truk), Pohnpei, Kosrae, Babeldaob, Satawal, Kapingamarangi, Nukuoro, Faichuk, Namonuito, Hall Island, Nomoi Islands, Weno, Rumung, Maap, Kanifay, Ngulu, Nett, Pingelap, and Lelu.

== People and culture ==
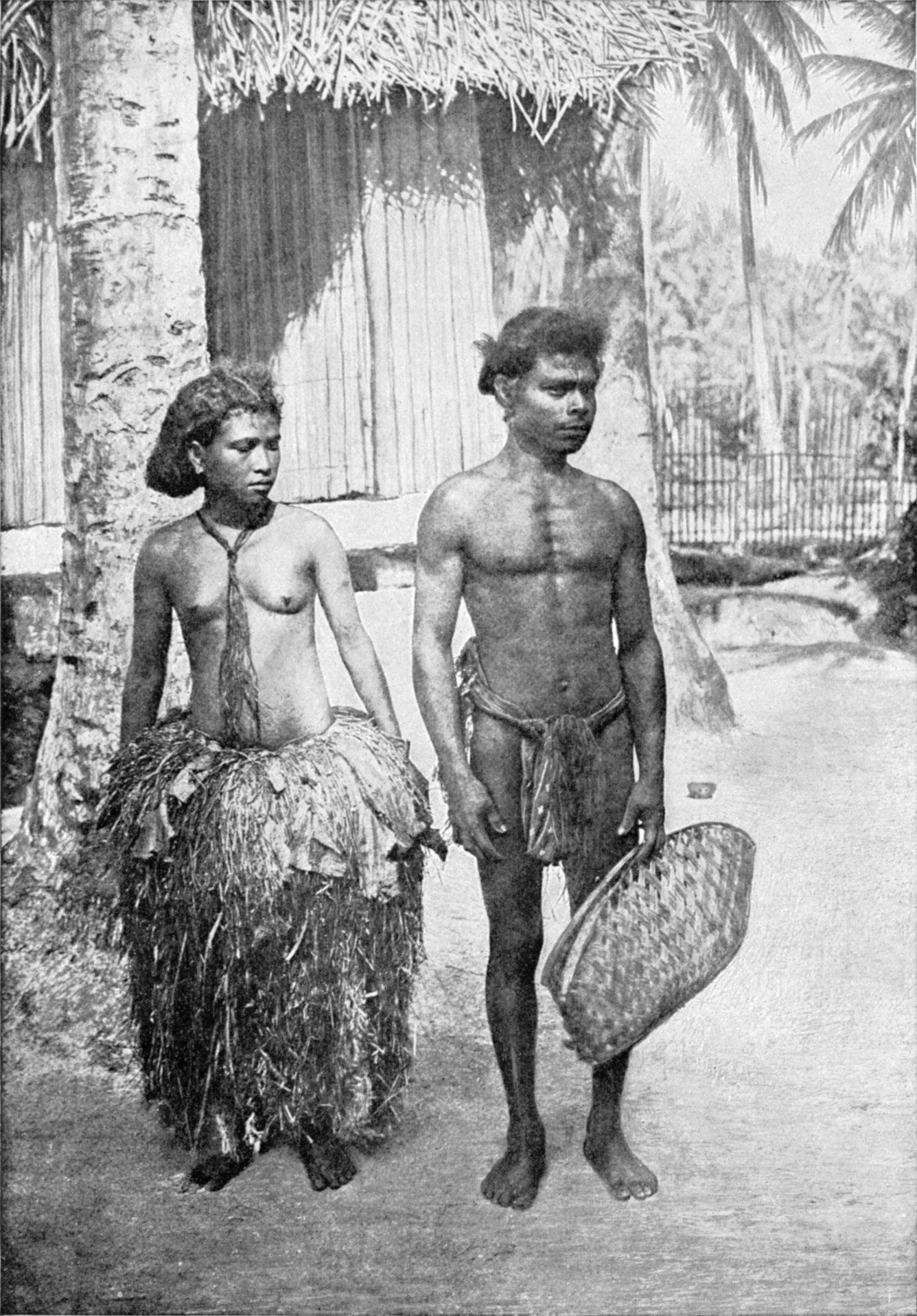
"Man and Wife of the 'Pimlingai,' or Slave Class," (1903), photograph by Furness. Illustration from The Island of Stone Money: Uap of the Carolines (1910)

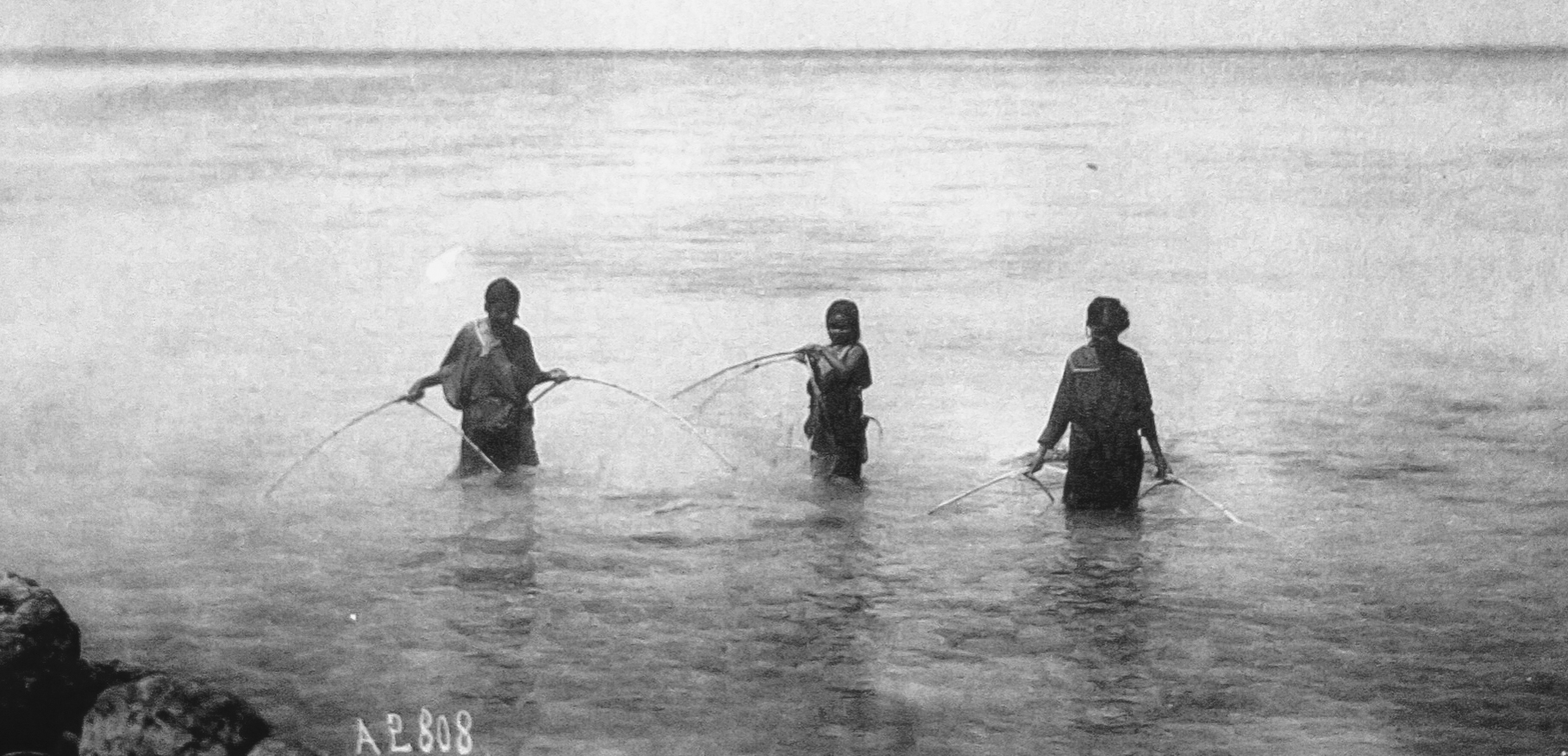
Women fishing with nets, Chuuk (1899–1900)

The indigenous inhabitants speak a variety of languages, including: the Micronesian languages of Pohnpeian, Chuukese, Carolinian, and Kosraean; the Western Malayo-Polynesian languages of Palauan and Chamorro; and the unclassified language Yapese (possibly one of the Admiralty Islands languages). There are also a significant number of inhabitants who belong to non-indigenous ethnic groups and speak other languages, including Filipinos and Japanese. The lingua franca used for trade and commerce among islanders who do not speak the same language is English.

The indigenous people of these islands live mainly on horticultural products, fish, many different varieties of bananas, and taro (either the "swamp" or the "purple" variety). On some islands, housing is still built using local materials such as coconut-palm thatch. As a result of missionary work over the centuries, Christianity is the religion most commonly practiced in this region of Micronesia. Many of the indigenous people adhere to the traditional belief in a supreme being called "Yalafar" and an evil spirit called "Can". For the most part, however, they do not engage in traditional religious rites.

The inhabitants of Yap are noted for possessing an unusual currency. Besides the ordinary shell money, there is a sort of stone coinage, consisting of huge calcite or limestone discs or wheels from 6 inches to 12 feet in diameter, and weighing up to nearly 5 tons. These are all quarried in the Pelew Islands, 200 miles to the south, and must have been brought by native vessels or on rafts; later they were transferred on European vessels. The stones, which are rather tokens than money, do not circulate, but are piled up round about the chief's treasure-house, and appear to be regarded as public property. Some may not have been seen for some years, but the transfer of wealth is facilitated by a common understanding that a stone has a new owner.

The Micronesian navigator Mau Piailug (1932–2010) was originally from the Carolinian island of Satawal. He learned the traditional navigation techniques of the Weriyeng school, which had been preserved after other traditional techniques had been forgotten (due partly to the remoteness of the Carolinian Islands). In the 1970s, Mau shared his knowledge with members of the Polynesian Voyaging Society. This led to a revival of the practices of traditional Polynesian navigation techniques, and provided anthropologists with a greater understanding of the history of the Polynesian and Micronesian peoples.

In 1985, a study was published that examined the origin of the sidereal compass used in the Caroline Islands.

== History ==
Different islands in the Carolines have passed down different legends about the origins and early histories of their peoples. For example, on Pohnpei, the islanders describe their history before colonial times as divided into three eras: the Mwehin Kawa or Mwehin Aramas (era of building or peopling, before 1100); the Mwehin Sau Deleur (era of the reigns of the Saudeleur, from 1100 to around 1628); (Note: The Saudeleur era lasted around 500 years. Legend generally dates their downfall to the 1500s, however archaeologists date Saudeleur ruins to c. 1628.) and the Mwehin Nahnmwarki (era of the tribal chiefs, from around 1628 to 1885, when Spain colonized the islands).

According to Pohnpeian legend: the Saudeleur rulers originally came from beyond the islands; they were the first to bring government to Pohnpei; they imposed absolute, centralized rule on the islanders, which became increasingly oppressive over the centuries; and their arbitrary and onerous demands, along with their offenses against Pohnpeian deities, sowed resentment among Pohnpeians. Legend has it that the Saudeleur dynasty ended when another foreigner, called Isokelekel, invaded the islands, overthrew the Saudeleurs, and instituted the more decentralized nahnmwarki (tribal chief) system (which was maintained even during the later Colonial period, and still exists today).

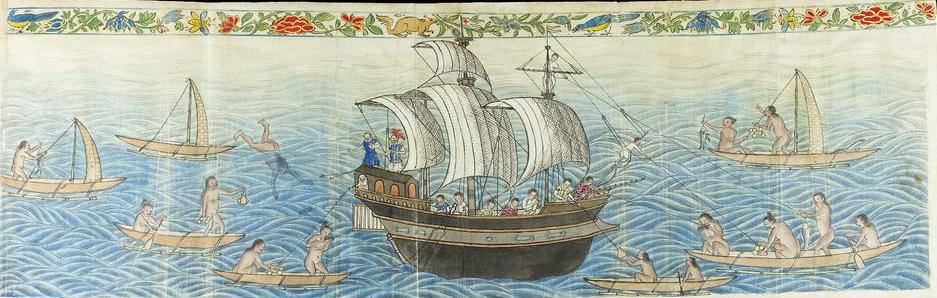
Manila Galleon in the Marianas and Carolinas, c. 1590 Boxer Codex

=== Spanish overseas province ===
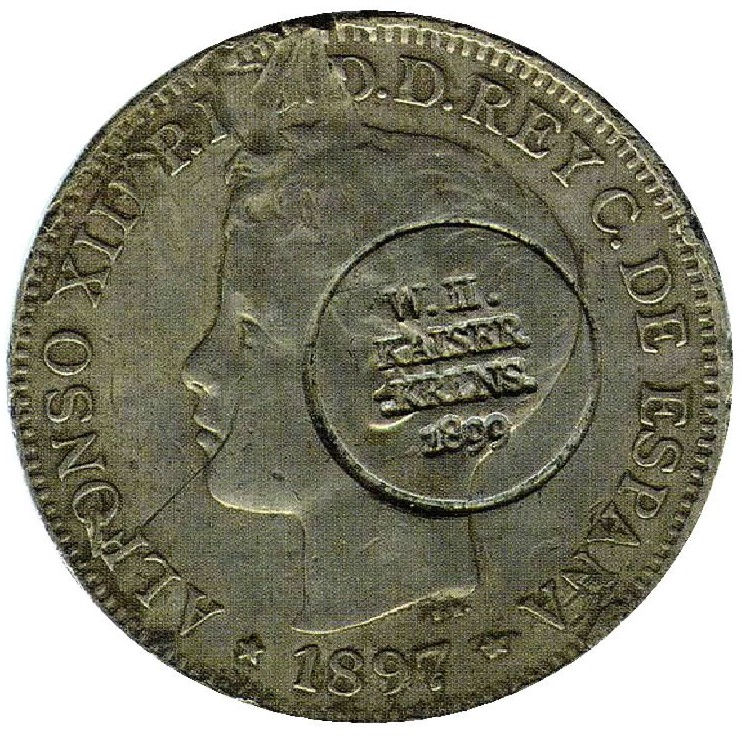
Spanish currency used in the Caroline Islands at the end of the 19th century. Note the German circular punch, made following the Spanish cession of the islands to Germany in 1899.

The first contact that European explorers had with the Caroline islands was in 1525, when a summer storm carried the Portuguese navigators Diogo da Rocha and Gomes de Sequeira eastward from the Moluccas (by way of Celebes). They ended up reaching several of the Caroline islands and staying there for several months, until 20 January 1526. Soon after, on 22 August 1526, the Spanish explorers Toribio Alonso de Salazar and Diego de Saavedra arrived in the area and recorded sighting the Island of San Bartolomé (Taongui). About 8 months later, on 1 January 1528, the explorer Álvaro de Saavedra Cerón claimed possession of the Ulithi Islands on behalf of the king of Spain. He named them the Islands of the Kings (Spanish: Islas de los Reyes; French: Îles des Rois) after his patron and the Three Wise Men honored in the approaching Catholic feast of Epiphany. Spanish explorers visited the archipelago again in 1542 (Matelotes Islands), 1543, and 1545. In 1565, the islands were briefly visited by the first governor-general of the Philippines, Miguel Lopez de Legazpi (in office from 1565 to 1572).

Europeans did not visit the island again until 1686, when Francisco de Lezcano arrived in Yap. He called the islands Las Carolinas, in honor of Charles II of Spain. This name was later extended to include the Palau Islands and the archipelagos that British explorers, visiting them a century later (between 1788 and 1799), would come to call the Gilbert Islands and the Marshall Islands (Spaniards today call the Caroline islands Islas de las Hermanas, Hombres Pintados, and Los Jardines).

A Spanish royal decree, issued on 19 October 1707, authorized Spanish missionaries to make several expeditions to the Caroline Islands. However, in 1731, one such missionary, Juan Antonio Cantova, was killed. As a result, Spain ceased relations with the Caroline Islands. When they resumed relations in 1787, their emphasis was on trade and commerce.

In 1852, a Spanish colonel named Coello suggested to the Spanish government that effective Spanish occupation of the Caroline Islands would help the Spanish engage in trade and commerce with the Philippines, Australia, New Guinea, and the Americas. His suggestion was ignored at first, but, in 1885, a Spanish government representative called Butron signed an agreement with the tribal chiefs of Koror and Artingal establishing Spanish sovereignty over the Caroline Islands. At that point, Spain attempted to impose customs duties on commercial exchanges in the region. However, Spain's previous abandonment of the islands had allowed the establishment of German and British missions on the islands, and Germany and the United Kingdom disputed Spain's right to collect customs revenue. The European powers called on Pope Leo XIII to arbitrate this dispute. He decided that Spain would have these rights on the islands west of the 164th meridian east, and Germany would have these rights on the Marshall Islands. (He also assigned Germany the right to maintain a naval station in one of the Caroline Islands, but Germany never exercised that right.)

After the Spanish–American War of 1898, Spain sold the Carolines and the Northern Marianas to the German Empire in the German–Spanish Treaty (1899) for 25 million pesetas (the equivalent of 17 million goldmarks or nearly one million pounds sterling), while reserving to itself the right to establish a coal mine in the area. Germany governed the archipelago as the Karolinen, and administratively associated it with German New Guinea.

=== A resort for whalers ===
The islands were a popular resort for whaling ships in the 19th century. The first such vessel known to have visited was the London whaler Britannia, which called at Ngatik in December 1793. Such vessels—from Britain, the United States, Australia and elsewhere—came for water, wood, and food and, sometimes, for men willing to serve as crewmen on the vessels. These ships stimulated commerce and were significant vectors for change (both good and ill). The islands most commonly visited were Kosrae, Mokil, Ngatik, Pingelap and Pohnpei.

=== Japanese colony ===
Japan invaded and occupied the islands in 1914 during World War I, as part of their campaign to take and occupy German colonial possessions. They installed two naval squadrons as part of this occupation. The Western Carolines were controlled by the squadron commanded by Rear Admiral Matsumura Tatsuo (1868–1932); while the Eastern Carolines were controlled by Vice-Admiral Yamaya Tanin (1866–1940). In 1920, after World War I, Japan received a League of Nations mandate to control the Caroline and Marshall Islands. During World War II, Japan operated a large base at Truk Lagoon which it used for expansion into the southeastern Pacific. In the latter years of that war, during the Japanese withdrawal to the Japanese home islands, the Allies effectively neutralized Truk in Operation Hailstone. After the war, the islands (together with the Marshall Islands) became trust territories of the United States. The Federated States of Micronesia gained independence in 1986, followed by Palau in 1994.

=== Colonial governors or officers ===
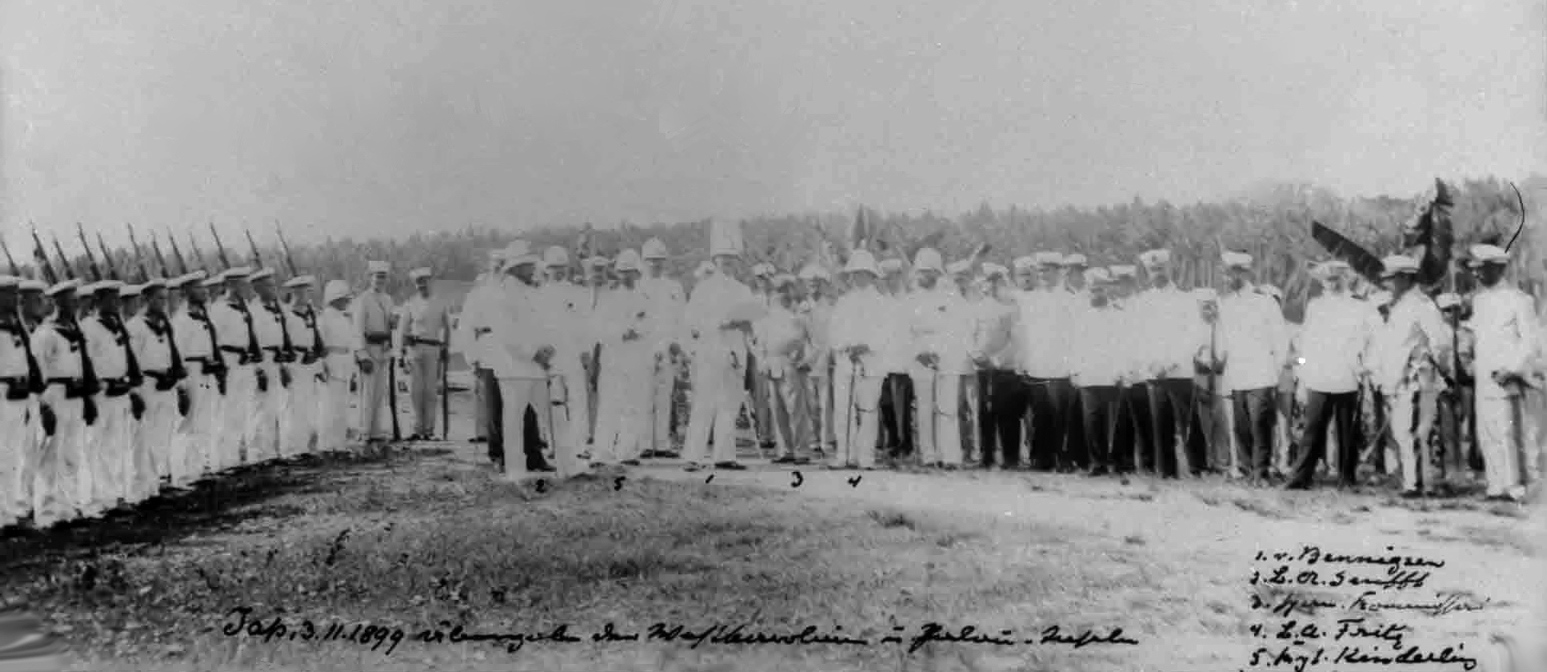
Transfer of sovereignty at Yap in the Western Caroline Islands (1899)

District officers (from 1889, styled Bezirksamtleute):

In the Western Caroline islands (Yap and Palau [and from 1907 Saipan])

- 29 June 1886 – 18??, Manuel de Elisa
- before November 1897 – after November 1898, S. Cortes
- 1899–1909, Arno Senfft (b. 1864 – d. 1909)
- 1909–19??, Rudolf Karlowa
- 1909–1910, Georg Fritz
- 1910–1911, Hermann Kersting
- 1911–1914, Baumert

In the Eastern Caroline islands (Ponape, and including the Marshall Islands from 1911)

- June 1886 – 1887, Capriles
- 14 March 1887 – 1887, Isidro Posadillo (d. 1887)
- October 1887 – January 1891, Luis Cadarso y Rey de Andrade (b. 1843 – d. 1898)
- c.1894, Concha
- before November 1897 – after November 1898, J. Fernández de Córdoba
- 12 October 1899 – August 1901, Albert Hahl (b. 1868 – d. 1945)
- 1 September 1901 – 30 April 1907, Victor Berg (b. 1861 – d. 1907)
- 1907–198?, Max Girschner (acting)
- 1908–1909, Georg Fritz
- 1909 – 18 October 1910, Gustav Boeder (d. 1910)
- 1910 – 7 October 1914, August Überhorst

=== Ecclesiastical history ===
Two Jesuits, Juan Antonio Cantova (also known as John Anthony Cantova) and Victor Walter, attempted missionary work there in 1731; the former was soon murdered and the latter obliged to flee. Two other Jesuits were killed later. In 1767, the Jesuits were suppressed in the Spanish dominions, and for the next 120 years there was no trace of a missionary in the islands.

After the 1886 dispute between Germany and Spain over possession of the Carolines was settled by Pope Leo XIII in favor of Spain, the king of Spain directed Spanish Capuchins to go to the islands. The royal order was issued on 15 March 1886, and the Propaganda Fide officially established that mission on 15 May 1886, dividing it into two sections, named the West Caroline's and the East Carolines. Until that time, the islands had belonged ecclesiastically to the Vicariate Apostolic of Micronesia. The Spanish Capuchins caused a catechism and prayer book to be printed in the Ponape language, and Father Anthony of Valentia wrote a small grammar and dictionary of the Yap language in 1890.

In 1899, after the Spanish priests had laid the foundations of the mission, the islands passed by purchase into the hands of Germany. Spain had contributed more than $5,000 a year towards the mission, but Germany contributed no support. Spain had compelled the indigenous people to send their children to school; Germany allowed people to choose to send their children or not. As a result, many people stopped attending church and sending their children to school, and the mission's fortunes suffered. In response, the Propaganda Fide decided on 7 November 1904 to replace the Spanish Capuchins with German missionaries, and on 18 December 1905 to erect a single Apostolic prefecture in place of the two separate missions. The Very Reverend Father Venantius of Prechtal, Germany, was appointed first prefect Apostolic at that time.

In 1906, 24 missionaries (12 Fathers and 12 Brothers) were working in 13 stations, and several Sisters of St. Francis left Luxembourg to take charge of the 10 primary schools, in which a total of 262 children were enrolled. The missionaries boasted 90 adult converts that year, and reported that there were 1900 Catholics, a few Protestants, and 11,600 inhabitants who had not converted to Christianity.

On 1 July 1905, the United States sent a Jesuit from the Manila Observatory to the island of Yap to erect a meteorological station there, and appointed the Capuchin Father Callistus as its director. The station was able to identify that the East-Asiatic typhoons were originating in the Carolines. The station made weather observations twice a day, and sent advance notice of severe weather to Manila.

== Postage stamps ==
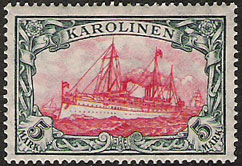
A German-era 5-mark "Karolinen" stamp showing a steamship

During the period of German control, Germany issued postage stamps for the islands.

== Transportation ==
Transportation within the islands is either by boat or air (if in close proximity of an airfield). Air travel is mostly domestic as most facilities cannot handle large aircraft. Caroline Islands Air is a chartered and the only domestic airline.

== Flora and Fauna ==
Palau and Yap are the only places outside the Philippines where Callicarpa micrantha is native.

Campnosperma brevipetiolatum was first named and classified by the German botanist Georg Volkens while carrying out research on Yap. He described the species in 1901 in the article 'Die Vegetation der Karolinen, mit besonderer Berücksichtigung der von Yap' in the periodical Botanische Jahrbücher für Systematik, Pflanzengeschichte und Pflanzengeographie(Leipzig).

Crinum bakeri is endemic to the Caroline and Marshall Islands, and was first described by Karl Moritz Schumann in 1887.

Psychotria hombroniana is endemic to the Caroline and Mariana Islands, with five subspecies being found on the Carolines, and three subspecies on the Marianas.

Three of the four species in the genus Ponapea are endemic to the Caroline Islands.

For a further list of flora found in the Carolines, see Flora of the Caroline Islands

The island of Kosrae has fifteen species of land snails endemic to the island.

== See also ==
- Wa (watercraft)
