= Vehicle registration plates of the Federated States of Micronesia =

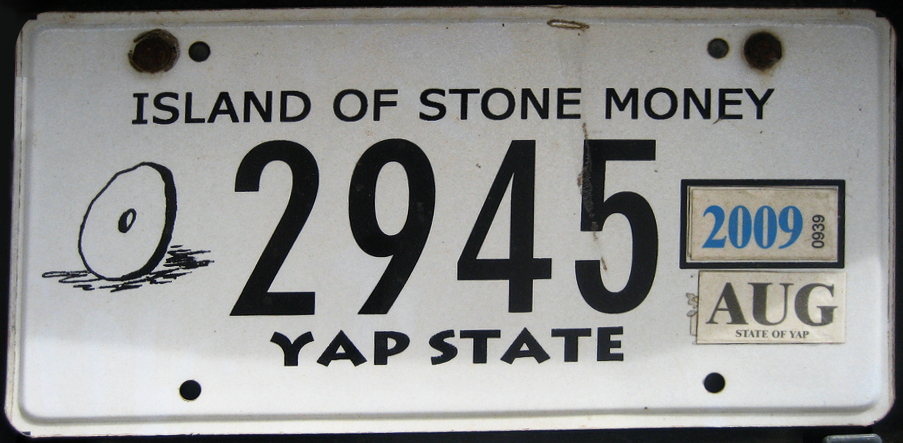
- Country: Federated States of Micronesia
- Country code: None

Current series
- Slogan: ISLAND OF STONE MONEY
- Size: 152 mm × 305 mm 6.0 in × 12.0 in
- Serial format: 1234
- Introduced: 2000; 26 years ago

The Federated States of Micronesia requires its residents to register their motor vehicles and display vehicle registration plates. Current plates are North American standard 6 by 12 inches (152 mm × 305 mm).

The designs of the plates vary by state, with Chuuk, Kosrae, Pohnpei, and Yap each issuing their own plates.

Although the history of the license plates of these islands is not well-documented, Chuuk, then known as Truk, had license plates as early as 1964.

Image	First issued	Design	Slogan	Serial format	Serials issued	Notes
			DIVERS HAVEN			
		Blue on white	Island of the Sleeping Lady	1234		
		White on green		1234		
		Black on white	ISLAND OF STONE MONEY	1234		
