= Gilman, Federated States of Micronesia =

Municipality in Yap, Federated States of Micronesia

Coordinates: 9°31′20″N 138°05′16″E

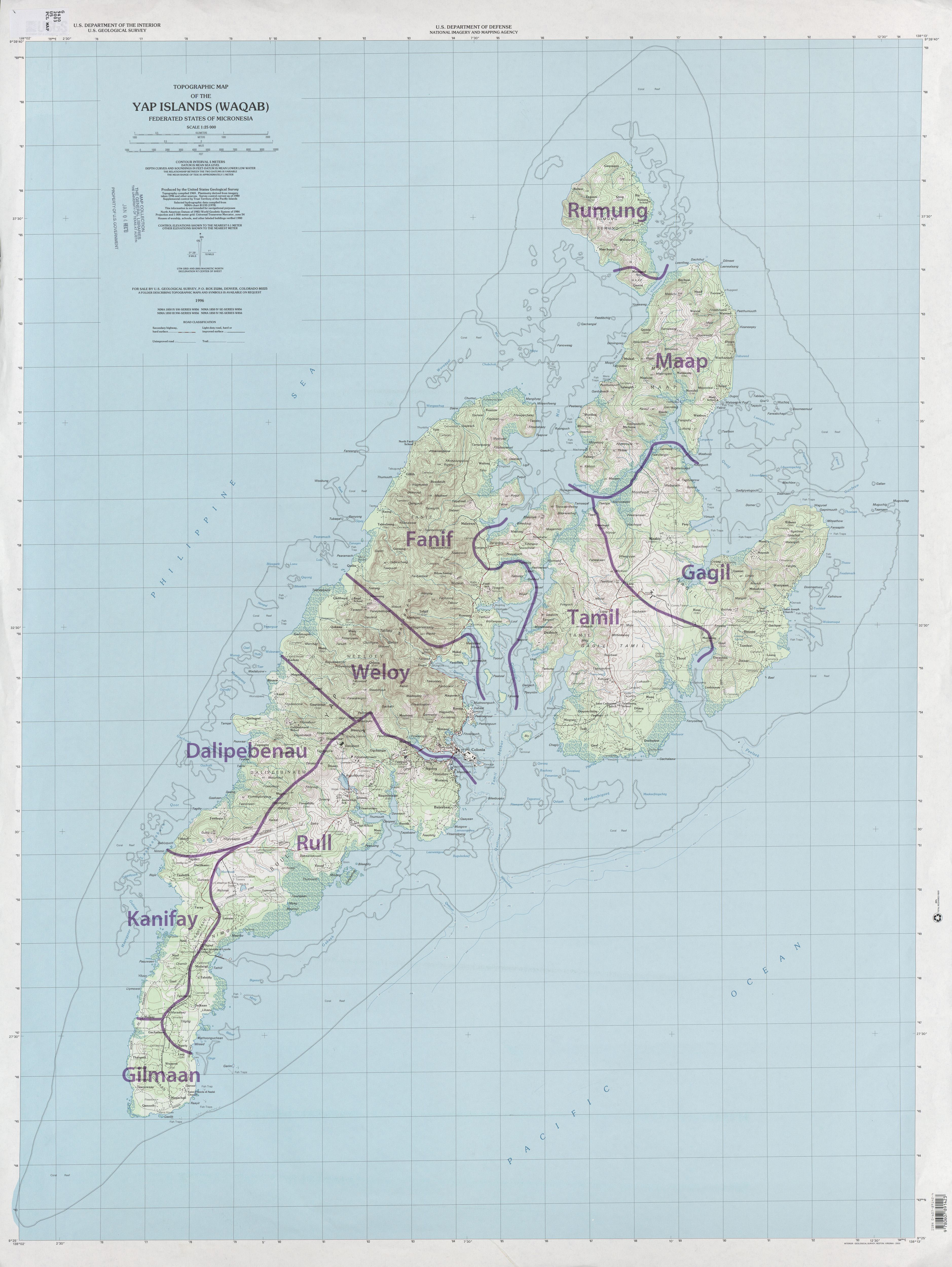
Map of the municipalities of Yap including Gilman

Gilman (Yapese: Gilimaan) is a village and municipality in the state of Yap, Federated States of Micronesia. It lies on the south side of the Yap island. Six villages or hamlets are integrated there : Anoth, Gachlaw, Guror, Magchagil, Thabeth and Towoway. The population was 252 in 2010.

Evolution of the population
1958	1973	1980	1987	1994	2000	2010
143	217	228	183	204	233	252
