= List of storms named Rai =

The name Rai (Yapese: raay) was used for two tropical cyclones in the West Pacific Ocean. The name, contributed by Micronesia, refers to rai stones in Yapese. Rai replaced Fanapi on the naming lists.

- Tropical Storm Rai (2016) (T1615, 19W) – a short-lived storm that made landfall on Indochina.
- Typhoon Rai (2021) (T2122, 28W, Odette) – a powerful Category 5-equivalent super typhoon that caused severe and widespread damage in the Southern and Central Philippines.

The name Rai was retired after the 2021 season and replaced with Sarbul (Yapese: sarbul), which refers to the monsoonal winds in Yapese.
