= Anagumang =

Legendary Yapese navigator

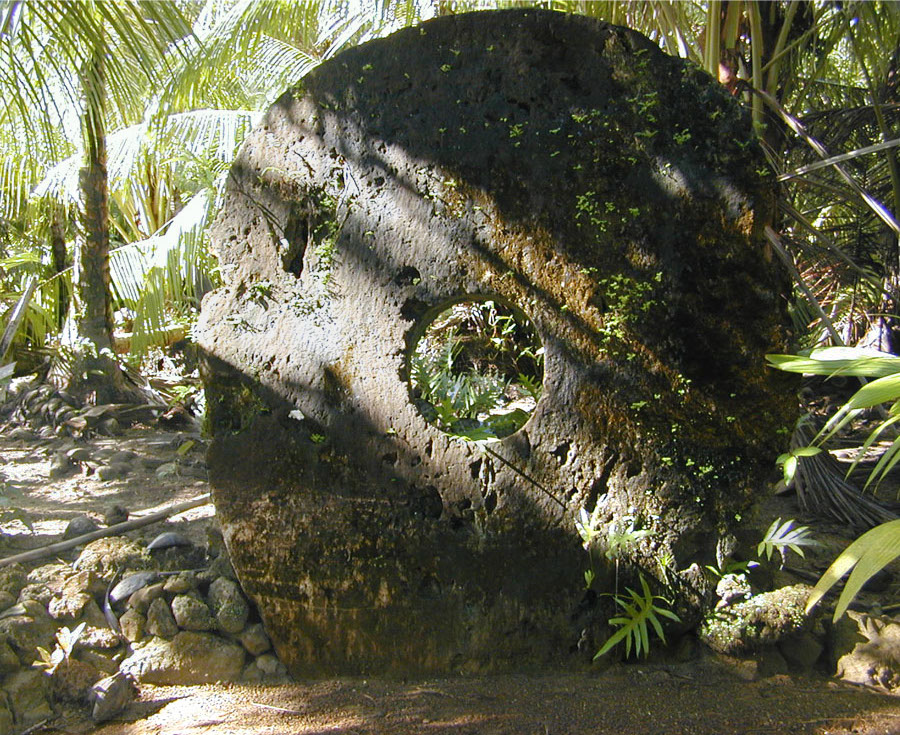
A large Rai stone on Yap.

Anagumang was a legendary Yapese navigator who led an expedition in rafts and canoes five or six hundred years ago. On this expedition he discovered the islands of Palau and brought stones from Palau to Yap.

== Expedition ==
Anagumang hired seven men with him for his journey, with the help of his mother, Le-gerem.

== Stones ==
First Anagumang ordered his men to cut stone into the shape of fish, then a crescent moon, and then a full moon with a hole in it for transport. He fashioned other stones so they could be slipped onto a trunk of a betel-nut tree. The stones came in different sizes. The smallest were 7-8 centimeters long, and the longest were 3.6 meters in diameter and 0.5 meters thick and weighed four tons.

=== Currency ===
These stones were called "Rai stones" and were also used as a form of currency. However, it was required that the stone must be proved to be made by Anagumang in order to be used as currency.

The currency was exploited by sailor David O'Keefe in the 19th century. For 30 years, he traded the stones for items such as Copra.

== Studies and beliefs ==
- It is believed that Anagumang worked with Fatha'an in a competition to bring money to Yap.
