= Nguluwan language =

Oceanic language of Micronesia

Nguluwan
- Native to: Federated States of Micronesia
- Region: Ngulu Atoll
- Native speakers: (50 cited 2000)
- Language family: Austronesian: Malayo-Polynesian; Oceanic; Admiralty Islands ?; Yapese; Nguluwan

Language codes
- ISO 639-3: nuw
- Glottolog: ngul1236
- Coordinates: 8.45°N 137.34°E

Nguluwan is a mixed language spoken on Ngulu Atoll located between Yap and Palau. The grammar and lexicon are Yapese, but the phonology has been affected by Ulithian. This language is endangered as it only has 50 speakers and that its speakers are shifting to Ulithian.
