= Dalipebinau =

Municipality in Yap, Federated States of Micronesia

Coordinates: 9°31′20″N 138°05′16″E

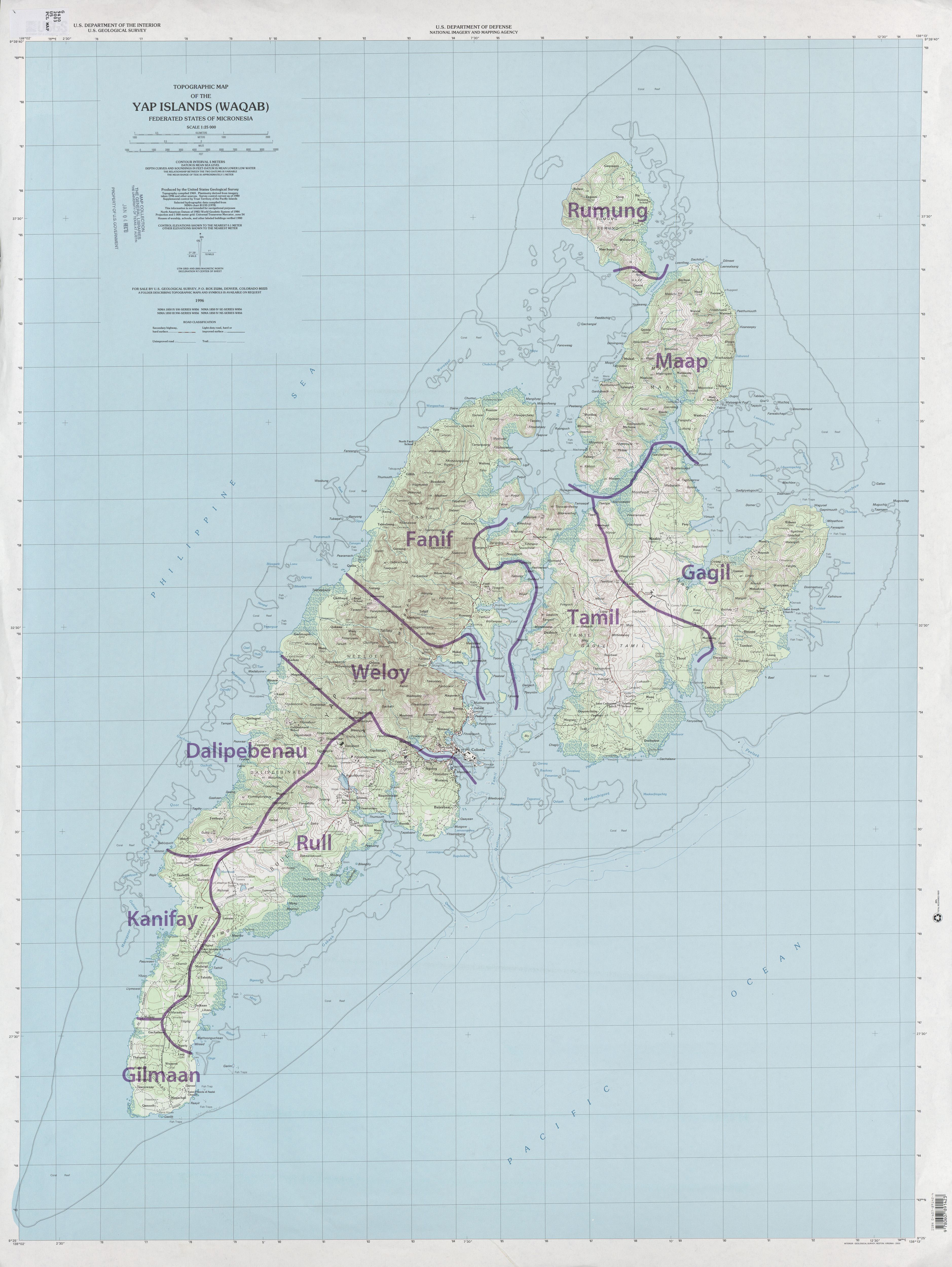
Map of the municipalities of Yap including Dalipebinaw

Dalipebinaw (Yapese: Dalipeebinaw) is a village and municipality in the state of Yap, Federated States of Micronesia. It lies on the west side of the Yap island, north of Yap International Airport.
