= Fanif =

Municipality in Yap, Federated States of Micronesia

Coordinates: 9°33′30″N 138°07′28″E

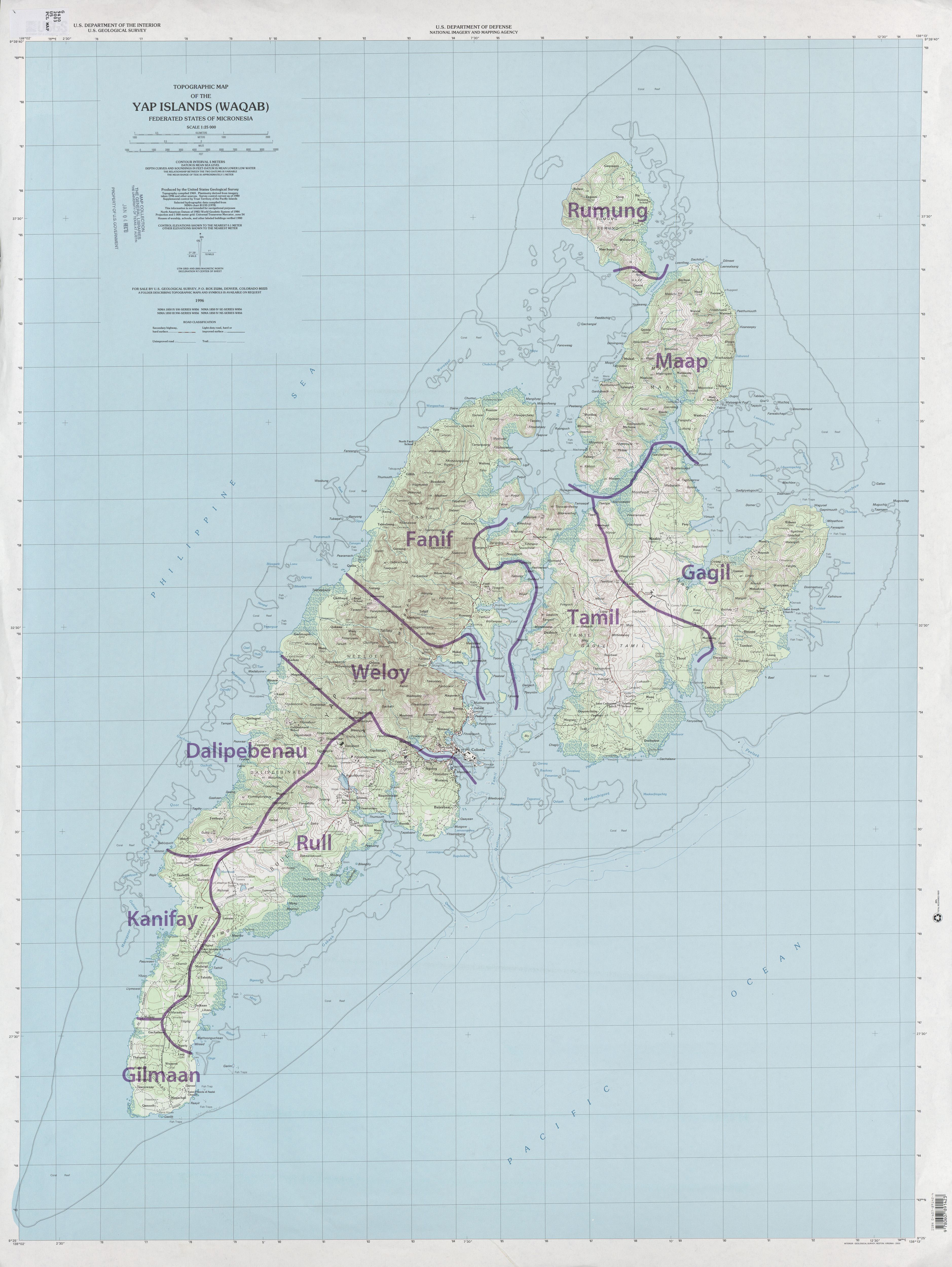
Map of the municipalities of Yap including Fanif

Fanif (Yapese: Fanif) is a municipality in the state of Yap, Federated States of Micronesia. Fanif encompasses the northwesternmost part of the main island and is the location of Yap proper's highest point, Mount Taabiywol, at 178 meters/584. Gilfith (Yapese: Gilfith) is the head village of Fanif. Fanif straddles the northern part of the main Island of Yap and includes the villages of Yyin, Quayrech, Ruunuw, Wuluuq, Malawaay, Rumuuq, Qatliw, and Raeng. It has two elementary schools, Fanif and North Fanif. A paved road runs through the villages along the northwest coast of Fanif into Weloy to the South and connecting into the Tomil - Colonia Road to the Northeast. The west coast is also accessible by boat from Colonia via the Tagireeng Canal.

      T[1]
