= Kanifay =

Municipality in Yap, Federated States of Micronesia

Coordinates: 9.525°N 138.0902°E

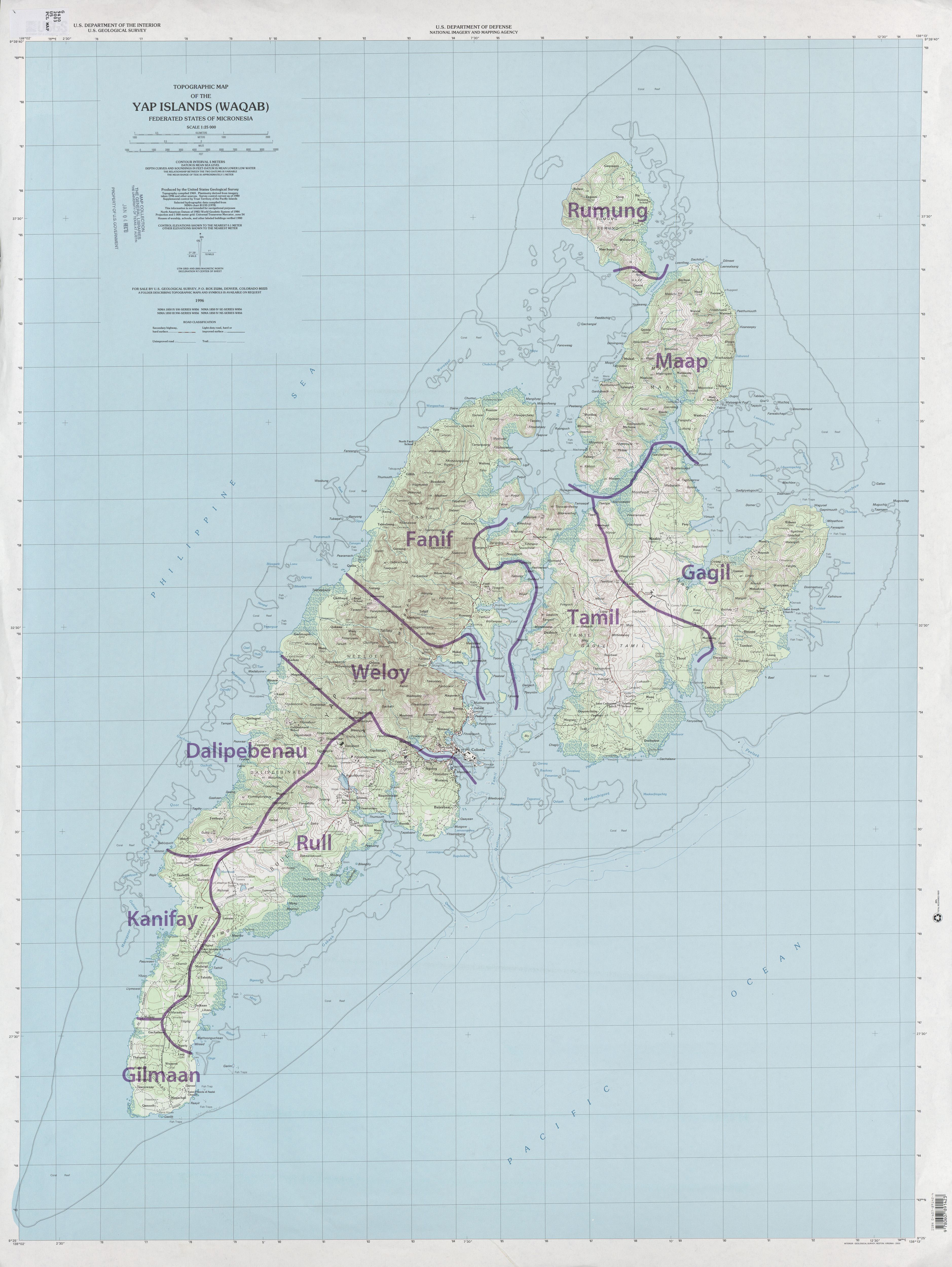
Map of the municipalities of Yap including Kanifay

Kanifay (Yapese: Kanifaay) is a village and municipality in the state of Yap, Federated States of Micronesia.
