= Administrative divisions of the Federated States of Micronesia =

The Federated States of Micronesia is a federation divided into four states, which are further divided into various cities and municipalities.

== States ==
States of Micronesia

Flag	State	Capital	Land area	Population (2023 Census)	Population Density (2010 Census)
Chuuk State	Chuuk	Weno	127 km^{2}	53,080	383 per km^{2}
Kosrae	Kosrae	Tofol	110 km^{2}	7,819	60 per km^{2}
Pohnpei State	Pohnpei	Kolonia	346 km^{2}	54,978	105 per km^{2}
Yap State	Yap	Colonia	118 km^{2}	12,601	96 per km^{2}

== Cities and Municipalities ==
Cities are written in bold.

State	Island	Name	Population	
State	Island	Name	1994	2000
Chuuk State	Eot		-	382
Chuuk State	Ettal		-	267
Chuuk State	Fananu		-	355
Chuuk State	Fanapanges		-	681
Chuuk State	Fefen		-	4,062
Chuuk State	Fono		-	397
Chuuk State	Houk		-	451
Chuuk State	Kutu		-	873
Chuuk State	Losap		-	448
Chuuk State	Lukunoch		-	927
Chuuk State	Makur		-	156
Chuuk State	Moch		-	854
Chuuk State	Murilo		-	607
Chuuk State	Namoluk		-	407
Chuuk State	Nema		-	997
Chuuk State	Nomwin		-	711
Chuuk State	Oneop		-	505
Chuuk State	Onou		-	182
Chuuk State	Onoun		-	598
Chuuk State	Paata		-	1,950
Chuuk State	Parem		-	385
Chuuk State	Piherarh		-	227
Chuuk State	Piis-emmwar		-	427
Chuuk State	Piherarh	Piis-paneu	-	523
Chuuk State	Pollap		-	905
Chuuk State	Polle		-	1,851
Chuuk State	Polowat		-	1,015
Chuuk State	Ramanum		-	1,011
Chuuk State	Ruo		-	469
Chuuk State	Satawan		-	955
Chuuk State	Tsis		-	490
Chuuk State	Ta		-	253
Chuuk State	Tamatam		-	365
Chuuk State	**Tol**		-	5,129
Chuuk State	Tonoas		-	3,910
Chuuk State	Udot		-	1,774
Chuuk State	Uman		-	2,847
Chuuk State	Unanu		-	178
Chuuk State	**Weno** (capital of Chuuk State)		-	13,802
Chuuk State	Wonei		-	1,271
**Chuuk State**	Total		53,319	53,595
Kosrae State	Kosrae	Malem	-	1,571
Kosrae State	Kosrae	Tafunsak	-	2,457
Kosrae State	Kosrae	Utwa	-	1,067
Kosrae State	Kosrae - Lelu	Lelu (includes **Tofol**, capital of Kosrae State)	-	2,591
**Kosrae State**	Total		7,317	7,686
Pohnpei State	Kapingamarangi		473	474
Pohnpei State	Mwoakilloa		209	177
Pohnpei State	Nukuoro		349	362
Pohnpei State	Pingelap		518	438
Pohnpei State	Pohnpei	Kitti	5,178	6,007
Pohnpei State	Pohnpei	**Kolonia** (capital of Pohnpei State)	6,660	5,681
Pohnpei State	Pohnpei	Madolenihmw	5,951	5,420
Pohnpei State	Pohnpei	Nett	5,977	6,158
Pohnpei State	Pohnpei	Sokehs (Includes **Palikir**, capital of FSM)	5,773	6,444
Pohnpei State	Pohnpei	U	3,001	2,685
Pohnpei State	Sapwuahfik		603	640
**Pohnpei State**	Total		33,692	34,486
Yap State	Eauripik		118	113
Yap State	Elato		121	96
Yap State	Fais		301	215
Yap State	Faraulap		223	221
Yap State	Ifalik		653	561
Yap State	Lamotrek		385	339
Yap State	Ngulu		38	26
Yap State	Satawal		560	531
Yap State	Ulithi		1,016	773
Yap State	Woleai		844	975
Yap State	Yap	Dalipebinau	544	645
Yap State	Yap	Fanif	462	547
Yap State	Yap	Gagil	716	734
Yap State	Yap	Gilman	204	233
Yap State	Yap	Kanifay	245	275
Yap State	Yap	Maap	547	592
Yap State	Yap	Rull (includes part of **Colonia**, capital of Yap State)	1,973	2,019
Yap State	Yap	Rumung	143	126
Yap State	Yap	Tomil	897	1,023
Yap State	Yap	Weloy (includes part of **Colonia**, capital of Yap State)	1,188	1,197
**Yap State**	Total		11,178	11,241
Federated States of Micronesia			105,506	107,008

== See also ==
- ISO 3166-2:FM
