= Tomil =

Municipality in Yap, Federated States of Micronesia

Coordinates: 9°31′N 138°09′E

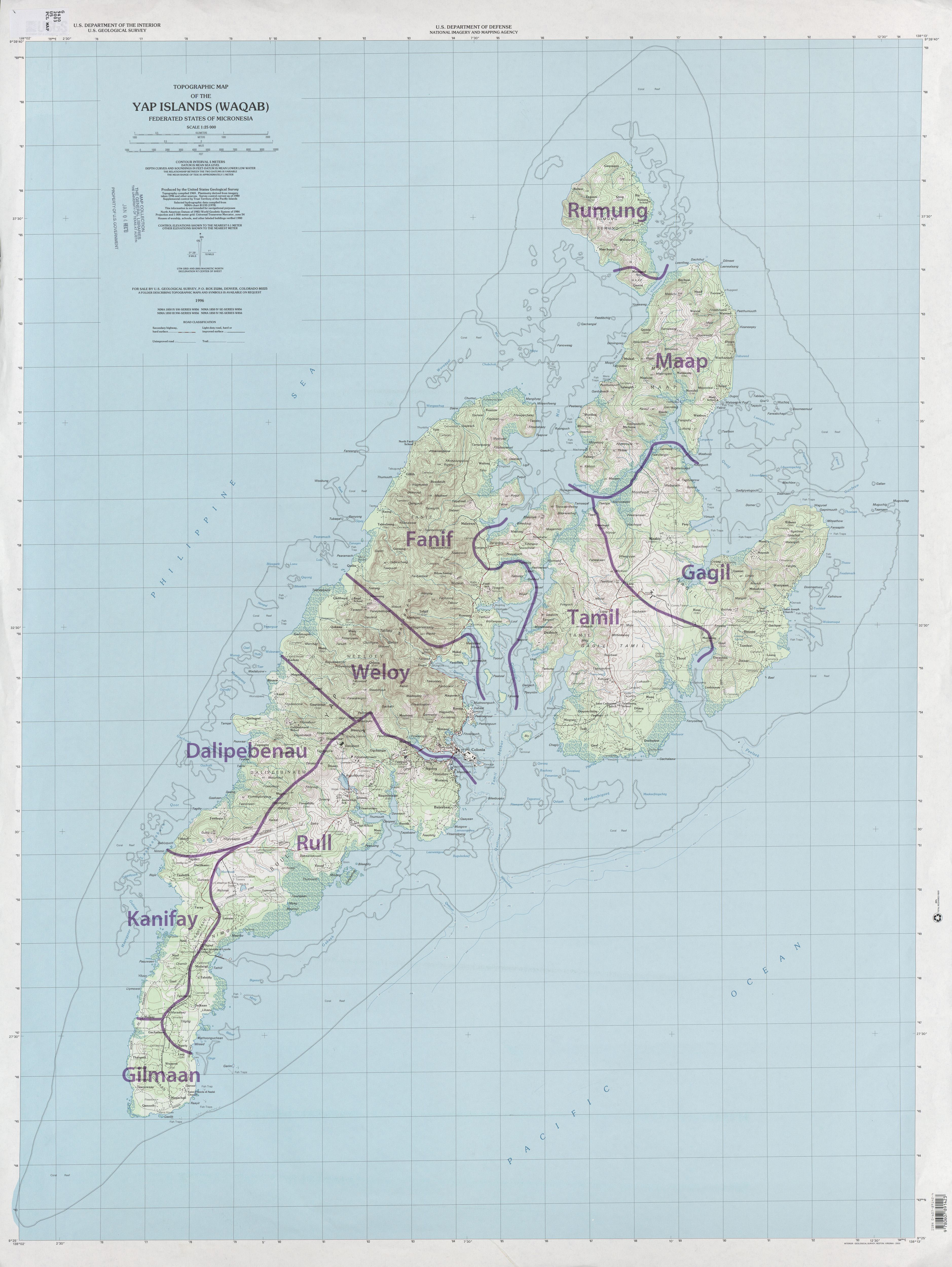
Map of the municipalities of Yap including Tamil

Tomil or Tamil (Yapese: Tamil) is a municipality on the island of Yap, in the Federated States of Micronesia. It consists of twelve distinctive villages: Meerur, Teb, Aff, Bugol, Doomchuy, Deechmur, Dilag, Maa', Thol, Madl'ay, Gargey, and Daaboch. Tomil occupies the southern portion of Gagil-Tamil Island, except for Gargey village, which is located on the main island of Yap.

Tomil is located on the northeastern part of the Yap Islands and positioned between the municipalities of Fanif, Maap and Gagil. Tomil is known for having its own explicit volcanic or none volcanic soil studied once by scientists. It is the second largest municipality on Yap. Tomil is also known for having its own distinctive Yapese language mainly emphasizing the vowel 'e' pronunciation.

The annual celebration of the Yap Day, usually held March 1, 2, and 3rd of every year, were celebrated in Tomil for consecutive years in Tumor. Several Yap proper leaders, such as former Governor Vincent Figir, former Attorney General and current Chief Justice Cyprian Manmaw, former Governor Robert Ruecho, Senator Joseph Giliko, and Senator and former speaker of the house, and current Governor Charles Chieng, have also originated from Tomil.

== Climate ==
Tamil has a tropical rainforest climate (Af) with heavy rainfall year-round.

Climate data for Tamil
Month	Jan	Feb	Mar	Apr	May	Jun	Jul	Aug	Sep	Oct	Nov	Dec	Year
Mean daily maximum °C (°F)	29.7 (85.4)	29.6 (85.2)	30.0 (86.0)	30.4 (86.8)	30.7 (87.3)	30.4 (86.8)	30.2 (86.3)	30.1 (86.2)	30.1 (86.2)	30.5 (86.9)	30.3 (86.6)	29.8 (85.6)	30.2 (86.3)
Daily mean °C (°F)	26.9 (80.4)	26.8 (80.2)	27.1 (80.8)	27.5 (81.5)	27.6 (81.7)	27.3 (81.1)	27.1 (80.7)	27.0 (80.6)	26.9 (80.5)	27.2 (80.9)	27.2 (81.0)	26.9 (80.5)	27.1 (80.8)
Mean daily minimum °C (°F)	24.2 (75.5)	24.1 (75.3)	24.3 (75.7)	24.6 (76.2)	24.6 (76.2)	24.2 (75.5)	23.9 (75.1)	23.9 (75.0)	23.8 (74.9)	23.9 (75.0)	24.2 (75.5)	24.2 (75.5)	24.2 (75.5)
Average rainfall mm (inches)	162.3 (6.390)	145.5 (5.730)	145.5 (5.730)	145.8 (5.740)	242.8 (9.560)	292.1 (11.500)	384.6 (15.140)	363.7 (14.320)	349.0 (13.740)	285.2 (11.230)	229.4 (9.030)	269.2 (10.600)	3,015.1 (118.71)
