= Crinum bakeri =

Scientific classification
- Kingdom: Plantae
- Clade: Tracheophytes
- Clade: Angiosperms
- Clade: Monocots
- Order: Asparagales
- Family: Amaryllidaceae
- Subfamily: Amaryllidoideae
- Genus: Crinum
- Species: C. bakeri

Binomial name
- Crinum bakeri K.Schum.

Species of flowering plant

Crinum bakeri is a species of flowering plant in the amaryllis family Amaryllidaceae, native to the Caroline Islands and the Marshall Islands. It was first described by Karl Moritz Schumann in 1887.
