= Rumung =

Municipality in Yap, Federated States of Micronesia

- village and municipality
- Location within Federated States of Micronesia Location within North Pacific
- Coordinates: 9.6263°N 138.1519°E
- Country: Federated States of Micronesia

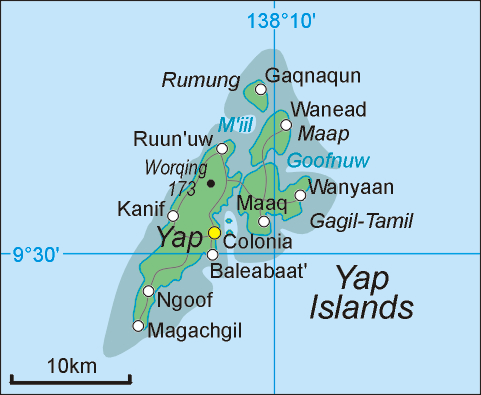
Map of the Yap islands

Rumung is a village and municipality in the state of Yap, Federated States of Micronesia. It is also the northernmost main island.
