= Yap =

Island group in the Federated States of Micronesia

Yap Wa'ab (Yapese)
- Island group
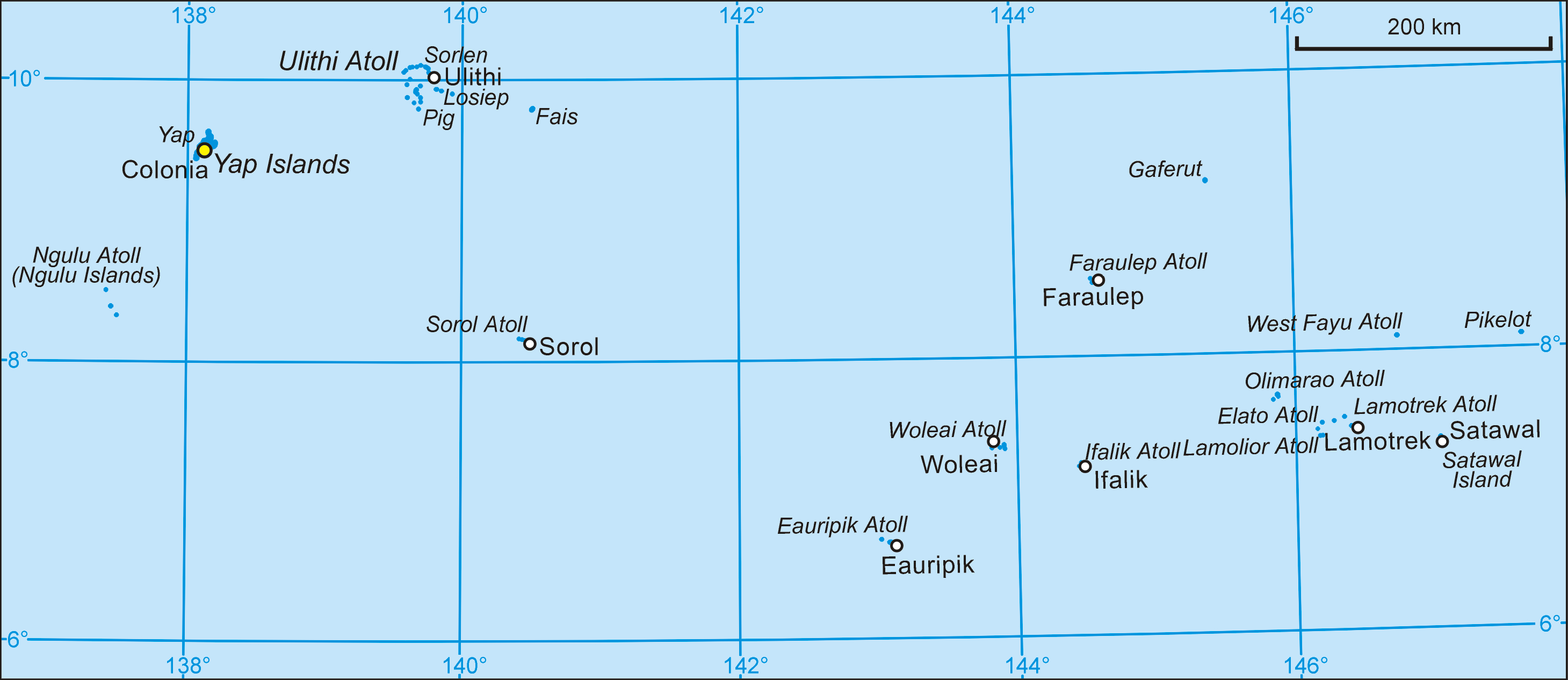
- Map of the Yap Islands

- Map of Yap Proper (Marbaaq)
- Coordinates: 9°30′N 138°07′E
- Country: Federated States of Micronesia

Area
  - Total: 308 km^{2} (118.9 sq mi)
  - Land: 100 km^{2} (38.7 sq mi)
- Elevation: 178 m (584 ft)

Population (2010 census)
  - Total: 11,377
  - Density: 114/km^{2} (294/sq mi)

Yap (Yapese: Waqab, sometimes written as Wa'ab, Waab or Waqaab) traditionally refers to an island group located in the Caroline Islands of the western Pacific Ocean, a part of Yap State. The name "Yap" in recent years has come to also refer to the state within the Federated States of Micronesia, inclusive of the Yap Main Islands and its various outer islands, the Yap Neighboring Islands. For specifying the island group, the name Yap Main Islands is most exact.

== Geography ==
Yap is made up of four separate islands: Yap Proper (Marbaaq, with the southern region referred to as Nimgil), Gagil-Tamil, Maap (Yapese: Maap'), and Rumung (the latter three collectively known as Marfach). The four islands are encircled by a common coral reef and are separated by relatively small water features. Gagil-Tamil and Yap Proper were once linked, but in 1901 a narrow canal called the Tagireeng Canal was built to cut the two landmasses apart.

Yap was formed from an uplift of the Philippine Sea Plate, and is referred to as a high island as opposed to atolls. The land is mostly rolling hills, with densely vegetated valleys and savanna interiors. Mangrove swamps line much of the shore, although there are beaches on the northern and western sides of the islands. Excluding the reef area, the Yap Main Islands are approximately 24 km long, 5–10 km wide, and 98 km^{2}. The highest elevation is 178 m (584 ft) at Mount Taabiywol in Fanif municipality on Yap Proper.

=== Administration ===
Administratively, the Yap Main Islands are divided into ten municipalities that sometimes cross the water features that divide Yap into its constituent islands.

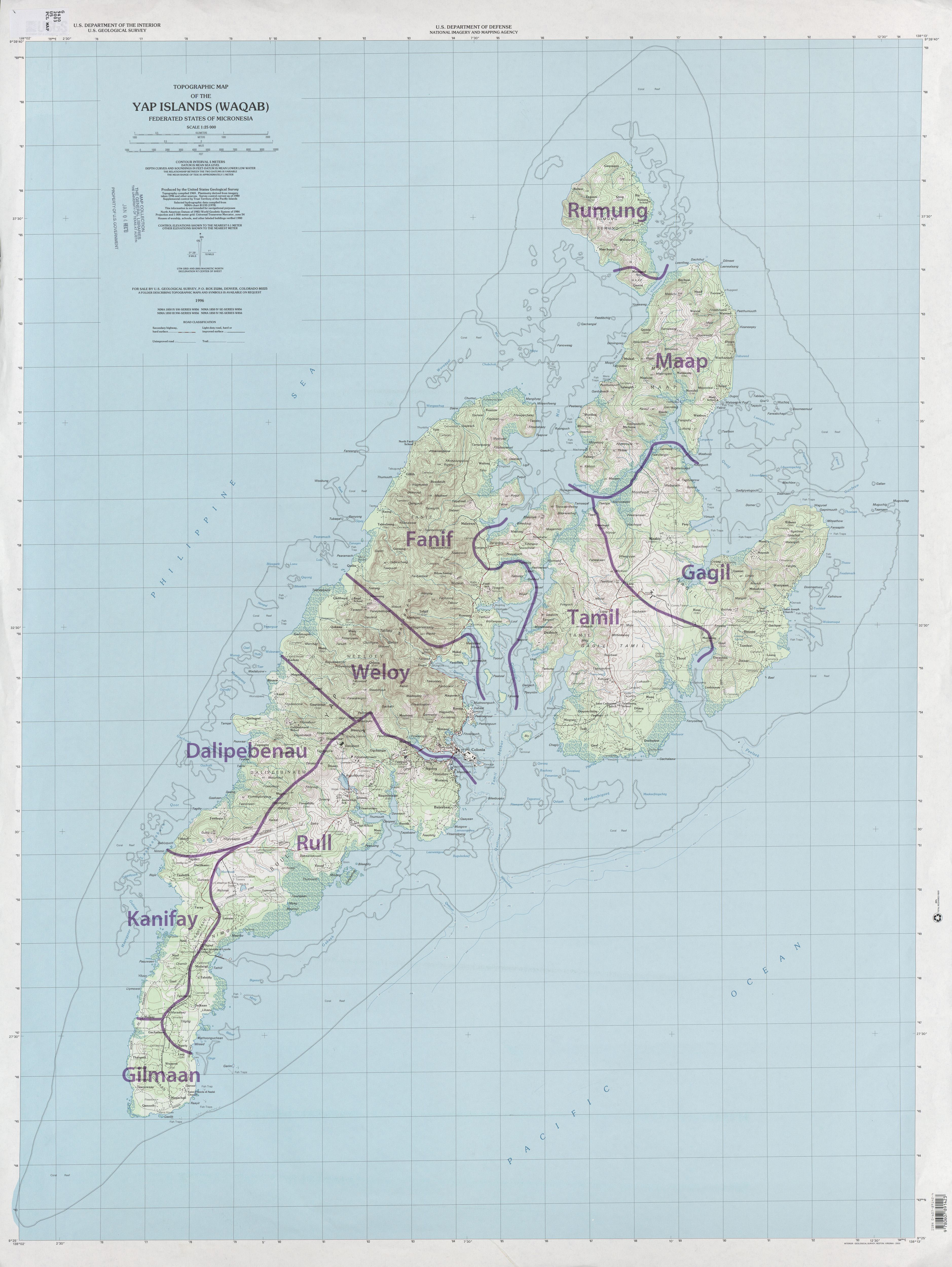
A detailed Yap map.

- Dalipebinaw
- Fanif
- Gagil
- Gilman
- Kanifay
- Maap
- Rull
- Rumung
- Tomil (Tamil)
- Weloy

=== Climate ===
The climate type of Yap Island belongs to the typical tropical rainforest climate (Köppen: Af), with high temperature and rainy weather throughout the year, and the most humid time of the year is from June to October.

Climate data for Yap Island (1991–2020 normals, extremes 1948–present)
Month	Jan	Feb	Mar	Apr	May	Jun	Jul	Aug	Sep	Oct	Nov	Dec	Year
Record high °F (°C)	94 (34)	96 (36)	95 (35)	97 (36)	96 (36)	97 (36)	96 (36)	95 (35)	96 (36)	96 (36)	94 (34)	94 (34)	97 (36)
Mean maximum °F (°C)	89.5 (31.9)	89.7 (32.1)	90.2 (32.3)	90.7 (32.6)	91.5 (33.1)	91.2 (32.9)	90.7 (32.6)	90.5 (32.5)	90.7 (32.6)	90.8 (32.7)	90.4 (32.4)	89.8 (32.1)	92.5 (33.6)
Mean daily maximum °F (°C)	87.1 (30.6)	87.1 (30.6)	87.9 (31.1)	88.6 (31.4)	88.9 (31.6)	88.5 (31.4)	87.8 (31.0)	87.5 (30.8)	87.7 (30.9)	88.1 (31.2)	88.0 (31.1)	87.4 (30.8)	87.9 (31.1)
Daily mean °F (°C)	81.0 (27.2)	80.9 (27.2)	81.3 (27.4)	82.1 (27.8)	82.5 (28.1)	82.0 (27.8)	81.4 (27.4)	81.1 (27.3)	81.3 (27.4)	81.5 (27.5)	81.7 (27.6)	81.4 (27.4)	81.5 (27.5)
Mean daily minimum °F (°C)	74.9 (23.8)	74.6 (23.7)	74.7 (23.7)	75.6 (24.2)	76.0 (24.4)	75.4 (24.1)	75.0 (23.9)	74.8 (23.8)	74.8 (23.8)	75.0 (23.9)	75.4 (24.1)	75.5 (24.2)	75.1 (23.9)
Mean minimum °F (°C)	71.5 (21.9)	71.4 (21.9)	71.0 (21.7)	71.9 (22.2)	72.3 (22.4)	72.1 (22.3)	71.6 (22.0)	71.4 (21.9)	71.6 (22.0)	71.6 (22.0)	71.6 (22.0)	71.9 (22.2)	69.2 (20.7)
Record low °F (°C)	67 (19)	66 (19)	64 (18)	66 (19)	67 (19)	65 (18)	66 (19)	65 (18)	66 (19)	66 (19)	63 (17)	65 (18)	63 (17)
Average precipitation inches (mm)	7.85 (199)	5.81 (148)	5.80 (147)	6.19 (157)	9.11 (231)	12.15 (309)	14.89 (378)	14.84 (377)	14.59 (371)	12.60 (320)	9.26 (235)	10.33 (262)	123.42 (3,135)
Average precipitation days (≥ 0.01 inch)	20.4	18.2	17.2	17.9	20.8	24.3	23.8	23.1	23.0	22.6	22.6	22.4	256.3
Source 1: NOAA
Source 2: XMACIS2 (mean maxima/minima 1991–2020)

== Language and ethnicity ==
The Yapese language belongs to the Austronesian languages, more specifically to the Oceanic languages. Yap was initially settled by ancient migrants from the Malay Peninsula, the Indonesian Archipelago, New Guinea, and the Solomon Islands. The people of the Yap State outer islands are descendants of Micronesian settlers, and as such have significant ethnic dissimilarities from the people of the Yap Main Islands. Their culture and languages (Ulithian, Woleaian, and Satawalese) are closely related to those of the outer islands of Chuuk. English is used as a common language.

The Yapese people's indigenous cultures and traditions are stronger compared to those of other states in Micronesia.

== Culture ==
=== Stone money ===
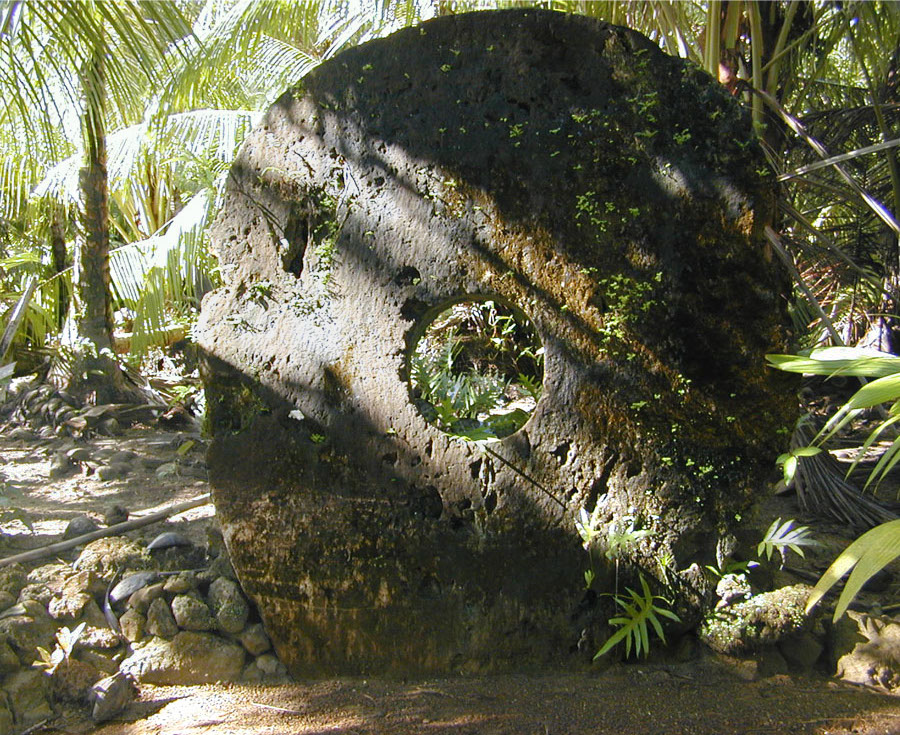
A large (approximately 2.4 m [7.9 ft] in height) example of Yapese stone money (Rai) in the village of Gachpar

Yap is known for its stone money, known as Rai, or Fei: large doughnut-shaped, carved disks of (usually) calcite, up to 4 m (13 ft) in diameter (most are much smaller). The smallest can be as little as 3.5 centimetres (1.4 in) in diameter. Many of them were brought from other islands, as far as New Guinea, but most came in ancient times from Palau. Their value is based on both the stone's size and its history. Historically the Yapese valued the disks because the material looks like quartz, and these were the shiniest objects available. Eventually the stones became legal tender and were even mandatory in some payments.

The value of the stones was kept high due to the difficulty and hazards involved in obtaining them. To quarry the stones, Yapese adventurers had to sail to distant islands and deal with local inhabitants who were sometimes hostile. Once quarried, the disks had to be transported back to Yap on rafts towed behind sail-driven canoes. The scarcity of the disks, and the effort and peril required to get them, made them valuable to the Yapese.

In 1874, Irish American sea captain David O'Keefe hit upon the idea of employing the Yapese to import more "money" in the form of shiploads of large stones, also from Palau. O'Keefe then traded these stones with the Yapese for other commodities such as sea cucumbers and copra. The 1954 film His Majesty O'Keefe cast Burt Lancaster in the captain's role. Although some of the O'Keefe stones are larger than the canoe-transported stones, they are less valuable than the earlier stones due to the comparative ease with which they were obtained.

Since no more disks are being produced or imported, this money supply is fixed. The islanders know who owns which piece but do not necessarily move them when ownership changes, as their size and weight (the largest ones require 20 adult men to carry) make them very difficult to move around. Although today the United States dollar is the currency used for everyday transactions in Yap, the stone disks are still used for more traditional or ceremonial exchange. The stone disks may change ownership during marriages, transfers of land title, or as compensation for damages suffered by an aggrieved party.

=== Other currencies ===
There are four other types of currency on the Island. First there is "Mmbul" which is a length of lava-lava, the cloth used for loincloths, three or four feet long and two feet wide, wrapped up in a Betel nut sheath. Then there is "Gau" or "Gaw", a necklace of shells, up to 10 feet in length. The shells come from Canet, an island near Ponape, from Ponape itself and from Euripik. Since these come from a distance, Gau is worth more than Mmbul. "Yar" is money made of large shells about eight inches wide, pierced and tied on a coconut rope. Finally, "Reng" is the name of money made of turmeric, which is ground and mixed with water and the paste shaped into a ball, typically used for tribal ceremonies.

=== Living structures ===
There are three types of traditional buildings on Yap. The "tabinaw" is a family house and has a roof made of woven thatch (dried palm fronds). Inside, there is one open room with no lavatory. Kitchens are separate structures (t'ang) outside the family houses.

The "faluw" is the "men's house"; such buildings were built on the shoreline with easy access to the sea. Prior to World War I, women had been kidnapped and taken to the faluw. Today this practice no longer occurs. Women considered it an honor to be chosen for the faluw, because only the most beautiful women would be taken there. Such a woman was called the "mispil" (resident female) of the faluw. As the island's culture was more and more influenced by the rest of the world's views on prostitution, this practice ended.

Largest of the three types is the "p'ebay", a place for the community to come together for school, dances or meetings. As with all structures on Yap, it is necessary to obtain permission before entering. There are a few men's houses that women are allowed to enter; however, people must always ask for permission.

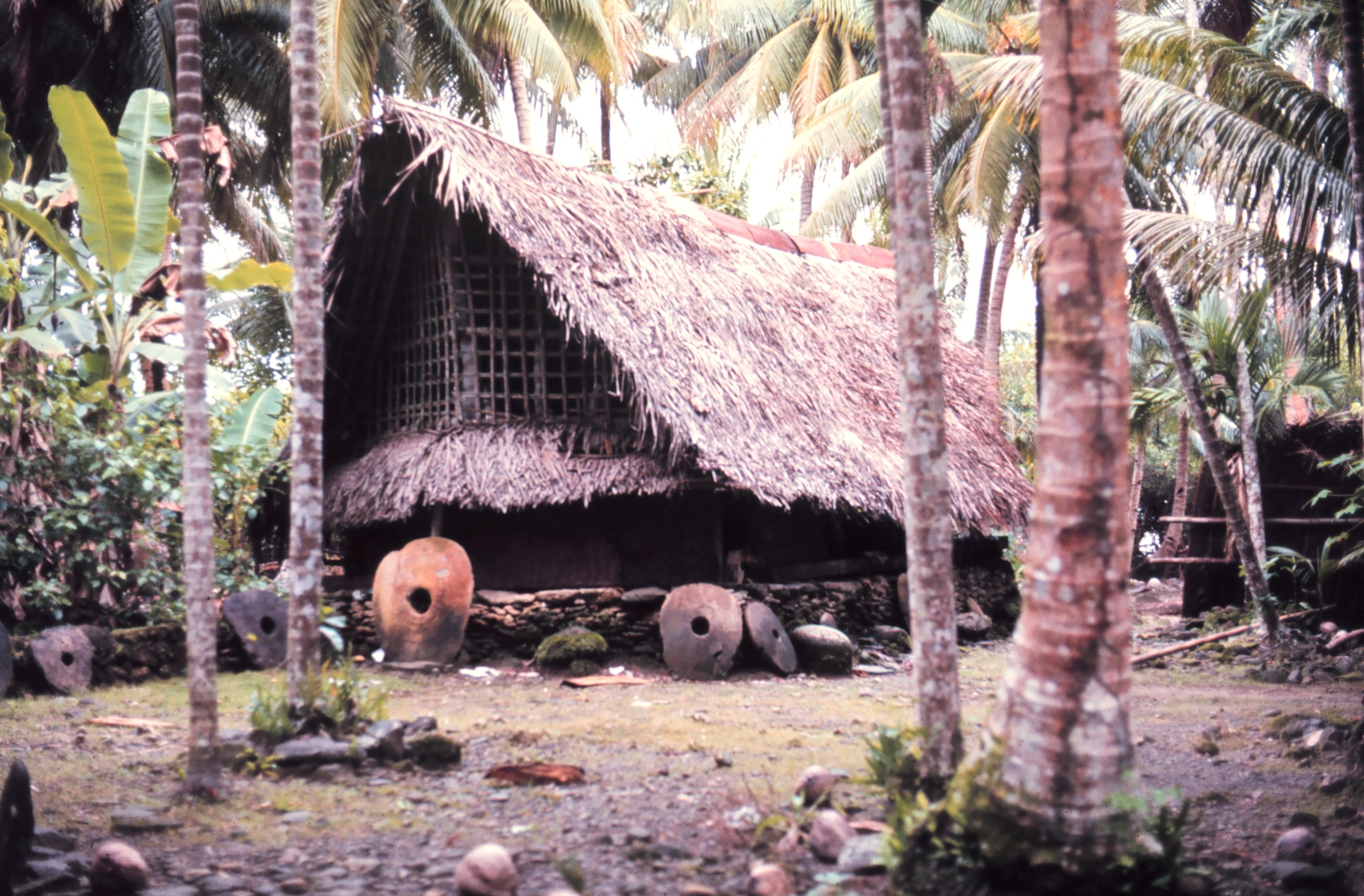
Traditional style structure with stone money indicating great wealth. The first stones were mined on Palau and carried by outrigger canoe some 450 kilometers (280 mi).

=== Navigation ===
The Yapese and Neighboring Island Yapese were some of the most renowned navigators in the Pacific. Yapese sailors traveled phenomenal distances in outrigger canoes, without the aid of a compass, navigating by the stars and the patterns of ocean waves using techniques of Micronesian and Polynesian navigation. During pre-colonial times, the people of Yap established an island empire and dominion over what are now the Neighboring Islands of Yap State. Beginning in the 19th century, Yap was colonized by the Spanish, Germans, and Japanese in succession.

The double-hulled voyaging canoe Alingano Maisu, gifted by the Polynesian Voyaging Society to master navigator Mau Piailug, is home-ported on the island of Yap under the command of Piailug's son, Sesario Sewralur.

=== Social structure ===
Yapese society is based on a highly complex "caste system" involving at least seven tiers of rank. Historically, the caste rank of an entire village could rise or fall in comparison to other villages depending on how it fared in inter-village conflicts. Winning villages would rise in rank as a part of a peace settlement, while losing villages would have to accept a decline in comparative rank. In many cases lower ranked villages were required to pay tribute to higher ranked villages. Further, dietary taboos might be imposed on lower ranking villages, e.g., they might be prohibited from harvesting and eating the more desirable fish and animals of the sea. Further, within each village each family had its own rank comparative to the others.

Until the arrival of the German colonizers, the caste ranking system was fluid and the ranks of villages and families changed in response to inter-village intrigues and confrontations. In the early twentieth century, however, the German colonial administration pacified Yap and enforced a prohibition against violent conflict. The caste ranking of each village in modern Yap thus remains the same as it was when the system was frozen in place by the Germans.

== History ==
Location of Yap in the Pacific Ocean

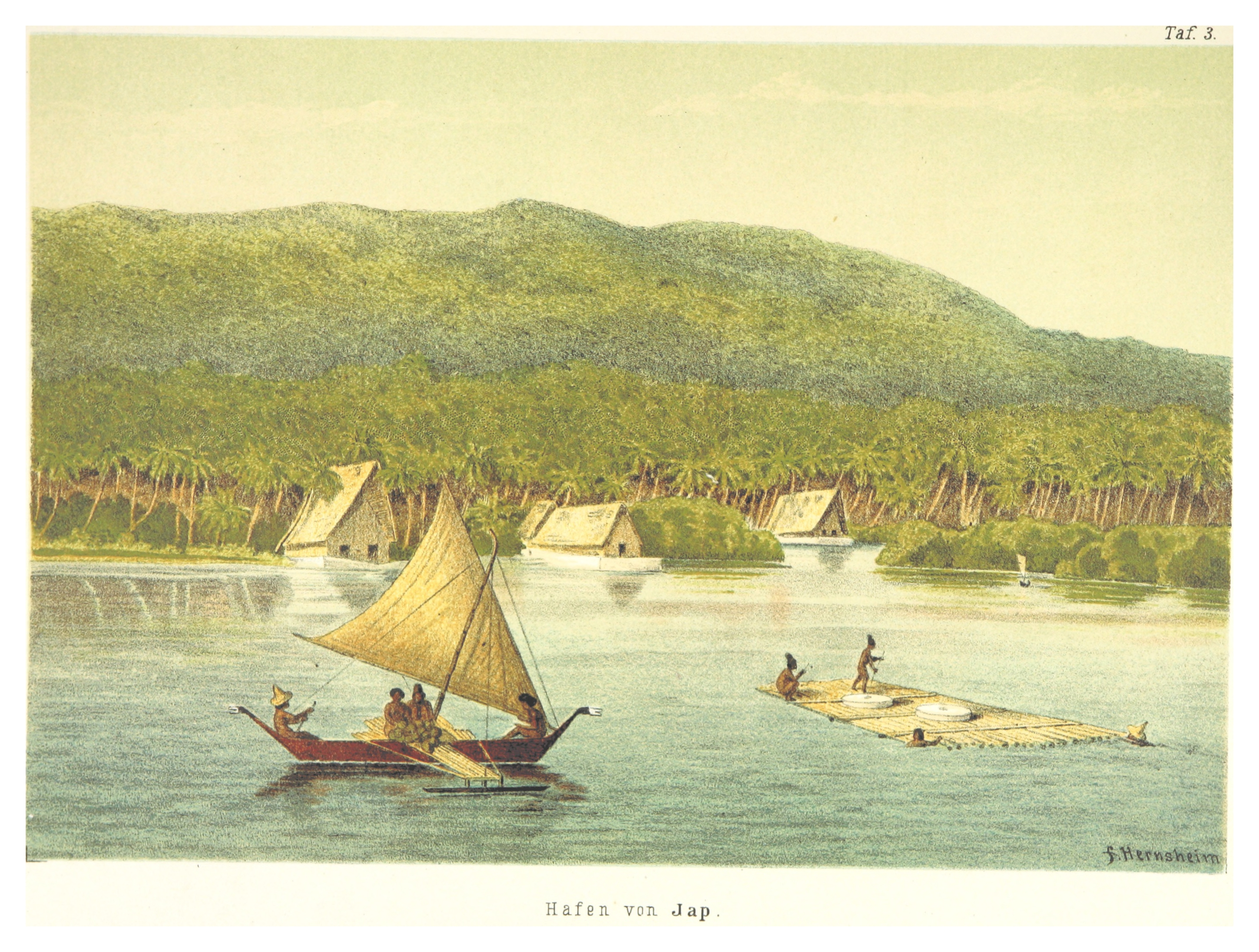
Stone money transport to Yap Island (1880)

The first recorded sighting of Yap by Europeans came during the Spanish expedition of Álvaro de Saavedra in 1528. Its sighting was also recorded by the Spanish expedition of Ruy López de Villalobos on 26 January 1543, who charted them as "The Reefs" (Los Arrecifes). At Yap, the Villalobos expedition received the same surprising greeting as previously in Fais Island from the local people approaching the ships in canoes, crossing themselves and calling out "Buenos días Matelotes!" ("Hello, sailors!"), which they took for Spanish but more probably reflected the missionary efforts of António Galvão, governor of the Portuguese East Indies. The original account of this story is included in the report that the Augustinian Fray Jerónimo de Santisteban wrote for the Viceroy of New Spain while in Cochin during his voyage home. Yap also appeared in Spanish charts as "The Chickpeas" (Los Garbanzos) and "Great Caroline" (Gran Carolina).

From the 17th century until 1899, Yap was a Spanish colony within the Captaincy General of the Philippines of the Spanish East Indies. The Spanish used Yap as a prison for those captured during the Philippine Revolution. After their defeat by the United States in 1898, and subsequent loss of the Philippines, Spain sold Yap and its other minor Pacific possessions to Germany in 1899 in the Spanish-German Treaty.

Yap was a major German naval communications center before the First World War and an important international hub for cable telegraphy, with spokes branching out to Guam, Shanghai, Rabaul, Nauru and Manado (on the north tip of Celebes). It was occupied by Japanese troops in September 1914, and passed to the Empire of Japan under the Treaty of Versailles in 1919 as a mandated territory under League of Nations supervision. It became the South Seas mandate. U.S. commercial rights on the island were secured by a special U.S.-Japanese treaty to that effect, concluded on 11 February 1922.

In World War II, Japanese-held Yap was one of the islands bypassed in the U.S. island-hopping strategy, although it was regularly bombed by U.S. ships and aircraft, and Yap-based Japanese bombers did some damage in return. The Japanese garrison comprised 4,423 Imperial Japanese Army soldiers under the command of Colonel Daihachi Itō and 1,494 Imperial Japanese Navy sailors.

At the end of World War II, Yap was occupied by the U.S. Military. The U.S. held it and the rest of the Caroline Islands as a trusteeship, the Trust Territory of the Pacific Islands, under a United Nations mandate until 1986. In that year, Yap, Truk, Pohnpei, and Kosrae formed the independent nation of the Federated States of Micronesia. Under a Compact of Free Association with the United States, Micronesian citizens and goods are allowed entry into the U.S. with few restrictions.

American Peace Corps was active in Yap from 1966 to 2018. Other U.S.-based non-profit organizations, including Habele, have an ongoing presence on both Yap Proper and its outer islands, aimed at reducing educational disparities and inequalities in access to effective classroom instruction.

== See also ==
- 2007 Yap Islands Zika virus outbreak
- Rai stones
- William Henry Furness III
- Constitution of the State of Yap
