= Yapese language =

Oceanic language spoken in Micronesia

Yapese
- Thiin nu Waqaab
- Native to: Federated States of Micronesia
- Region: Island of Yap
- Ethnicity: Yapese
- Native speakers: 5,130 (2005)
- Language family: Austronesian: Malayo-Polynesian; Oceanic; Admiralty Islands?; Yapese
- Dialects: Nguluwan
- Writing system: Latin script

Language codes
- ISO 639-2: yap
- ISO 639-3: yap
- Glottolog: yape1248
- Location within Southeast Asia
- Coordinates: 9.56°N 138.12°E

Yapese is an Austronesian language in the Oceanic branch spoken on the islands of Yap, in the Federated States of Micronesia. It has been difficult to classify the language further, but Yapese may prove to be one of the Admiralty Islands languages. The Yapese language refers to the language spoken specifically on the Yap Main Islands, and does not include the Chuukic languages spoken in the Yap Neighboring Islands: Ulithian, Woleaian, and Satawalese (and to an extent, Nguluwan).

== Orthography ==
The branches of the Oceanic languages. Orange is the Admiralties languages and Yapese, yellow-orange is St. Matthias, green is Western Oceanic, violet is Temotu, and the rest are Central-Eastern: dark red Southeast Solomons, blue Southern Oceanic, pink Micronesian, and ocher Central Pacific linkage.

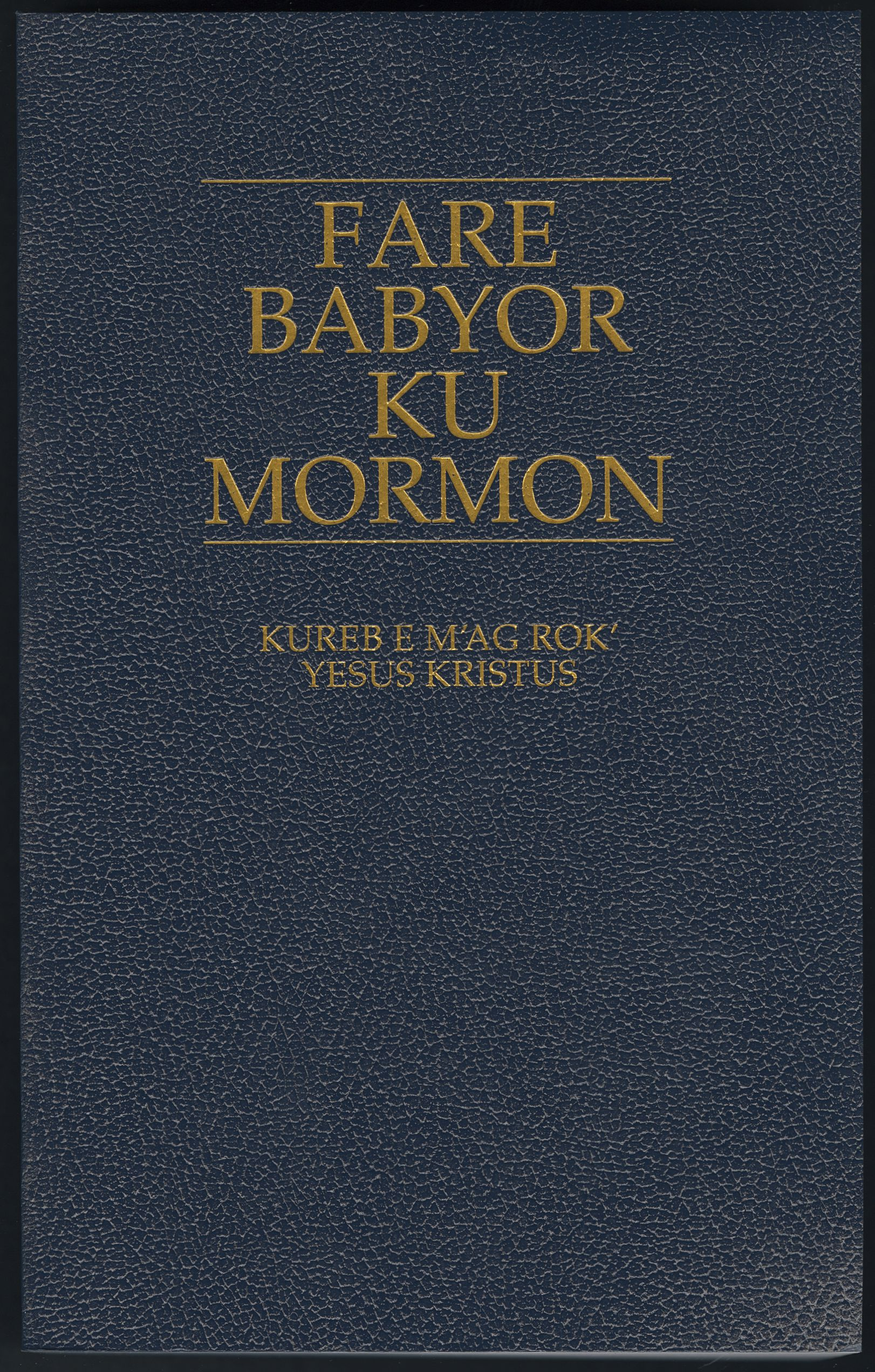
Yapese version of the Book of Mormon

Written Yapese uses the Latin script. In Yapese spelling as practiced until the 1970s, the glottal stop was not written with an explicit character. A word-final glottal stop was represented by doubling the final vowel letter. Glottalization of consonants was represented with an apostrophe. In the 1970s an orthography was created which uses double vowel letters to represent long vowels; and because of the ambiguity that would occur if the glottal stop was not written, the glottal stop was written with the letter q. This new orthography using the letter q is not in universal use, but many works and maps about Yap write place names using the new q-orthography.

For example: before the introduction of the new 1970s orthography, the indigenous name of the Yap Main Islands was (and still is) spelled Waab, where the glottal stop is assumed to be between the double vowel letters. After the 1970s orthography, the name was then officially changed to Waqaab to differentiate between the two a vowels (first one being a short vowel and the second one being a long vowel) before and after the q glottal stop.

The newer orthography was then taught in the public education system at the elementary levels; however, due to the differing preferences of spelling by the older and newer generations, it became hard to standardize Yapese spelling. Contemporarily, Waqaab is still spelled in the older spelling, as well as some other forms to compromise for the generational differences, e.g. Waqab and Waʼab.

A general rule developed organically over time especially when it came to the introduction of the more-widely accepted apostrophe ʼ as a glottal stop. If the glottal stop is between vowels or at the ending (or start) of a word with a vowel, then a q will be used; if the glottal stop is next to or between consonants, then an apostrophe may be used.

== Phonology ==
Apart from a couple grammatical forms which are V, syllables are CV or CVC.

=== Consonants ===
Yapese is one of the relatively few languages in the world with ejective fricatives. The Yapese ejective consonants are /pʼ tʼ kʼ fʼ θʼ/. There are also glottalized nasals /mˀ nˀ ŋˀ/ and approximants /jˀ wˀ lˀ/.

In the table below, each phoneme is listed to the left of the grapheme that represents it in Yapese orthography.

		Labial	Dental	Retroflex	Palatal	Velar	Glottal
Nasal	plain	m ⟨m⟩	n ⟨n⟩			ŋ ⟨ng⟩	
Nasal	glottalized	mˀ ⟨mʼ⟩	nˀ ⟨nʼ⟩			ŋˀ ⟨ngʼ⟩	
Plosive	plain (Note: Voiceless stops, including the glottal stop /ʔ/, are aspirated at the ends of words.)	p ⟨p⟩	t ⟨t⟩	ʈ͡ʂ ⟨ch⟩		k ⟨k⟩	ʔ ⟨q/ʼ⟩
Plosive	ejective	pʼ ⟨pʼ⟩	tʼ ⟨tʼ⟩			kʼ ⟨kʼ⟩	ʔ ⟨q/ʼ⟩
Plosive	voiced (Note: Voiced obstruents are stops or affricates after nasals and fricatives elsewhere, though certain regions of Yap may use the stop allophone word-initially.)	β ~ b ⟨b⟩	ð ~ d ⟨d⟩	(ʐ ~ ɖ͡ʐ ⟨j⟩) (Note: This phoneme only occurs in a small number of loanwords.)		ɣ ~ g ⟨g⟩	
Fricative	voiced	β ~ b ⟨b⟩	ð ~ d ⟨d⟩	(ʐ ~ ɖ͡ʐ ⟨j⟩)		ɣ ~ g ⟨g⟩	
Fricative	voiceless	f ⟨f⟩	θ ⟨th⟩	ʂ ⟨s⟩			(h ⟨h⟩)
Fricative	ejective	fʼ ⟨fʼ⟩	θʼ ⟨thʼ⟩				
Approximant	plain		l ⟨l⟩		j ⟨y⟩	w ⟨w⟩	
Approximant	glottalized		lˀ ⟨lʼ⟩		jˀ ⟨yʼ⟩ (Note: /yʼ wʼ/ only exist syllable-finally.)	wˀ ⟨wʼ⟩ (Note: Some speakers merge /wʼ/ into /ʔ/.)	
Trill	plain			ɽ͡r ⟨r⟩			

Dental and retroflex consonants may be palatalized next to front vowels, central vowels, and /u uː/, but not /æ æː/, though obstruents are less obviously palatalized.

=== Vowels ===
In the table below, each phoneme is listed to the left of the grapheme that represents it in Yapese orthography. Every vowel has a vowel length distinction.

	Front	Central		Back	
	unrounded	unrounded	rounded	unrounded	rounded
Close	i ⟨i⟩ iː ⟨ii⟩				ʊ ⟨u⟩ ʊː ⟨uu⟩
Mid	ɛ ⟨e⟩ eː ⟨ee⟩		œ ⟨ö⟩ œː ⟨oe⟩		
Open-mid	æ ⟨ë⟩ æː ⟨ea⟩				ɔ ⟨o⟩ ɔː ⟨oo⟩
Open		a ⟨ä⟩ aː ⟨ae⟩		ʌ ⟨a⟩ ɑː ⟨aa⟩ (Note: /ɑː/ is more fronted than cardinal [ɑ].)	

== Grammar ==
=== Morphology ===
==== Reduplication ====
Yapese makes use of reduplication for several morphological functions, including deriving stative adjectives from inchoative adjectives, as in (1a–b), as well as to make diminutives of verbs, as in (2a-b):

roow
become.red
'to become red'

toey
chop
'to chop'

roow~roow
STAT~red
'to be red'

si-toey~toey
DIM-DIM~chop
'to chop a little'

==== Pronouns ====
Yapese distinguishes between three numbers (singular, dual, and plural) and three persons (first, second, and third), as well as clusivity in its personal pronouns.

Independent personal pronouns
	Singular	Dual	Plural
1.EXCL	gaeg	gamow	gamaed
1.INCL	gaeg	gadow	gadaed
2	guur	gimeew	gimeed
3	qiir	yow	yaed

A Yapese Talking Dictionary was produced by Living Tongues Institute for Endangered Languages.

== Bibliography ==
- Jensen, John Thayer. 1977. Yapese–English Dictionary. (PALI Language Texts: Micronesia.) Honolulu: University of Hawaiʻi Press.
