= Mortlockese language =

Chuukic language

Mortlockese
- Mortlock, Nomoi
- Kapsen Mwoshulók
- Native to: Federated States of Micronesia
- Region: Caroline Islands
- Native speakers: (5,900 cited 1989 census)
- Language family: Austronesian: Malayo-Polynesian; Oceanic; Micronesian; Nuclear Micronesian; Chuukic; Satawalese–Mortlockese; Mortlockese

Language codes
- ISO 639-3: mrl
- Glottolog: mort1237
- ELP: Mortlockese
- Mortlockese is classified as Definitely Endangered by the UNESCO Atlas of the World's Languages in Danger.

Mortlockese (Mortlockese: Kapsen Mwoshulók), also known as Mortlock or Nomoi, is a language that belongs to the Chuukic group of Micronesian languages in the Federated States of Micronesia spoken primarily in the Mortlock Islands (Nomoi or Lower Mortlock Islands and the Upper Mortlock Islands). It is only somewhat intelligible with Satawalese, with an 18 percent intelligibility and an 82 percent lexical similarity, and more intelligible with Puluwatese, with a 75 percent intelligibility and an 83 percent lexical similarity. The language today has become mutually intelligible with Chuukese, though marked with a distinct Mortlockese accent. Linguistic patterns show that Mortlockese is converging with Chuukese since Mortlockese now has an 80 to 85 percent lexical similarity.

There are approximately five to seven thousand speakers of Mortlockese in the Mortlock Islands, Guam, Hawaii, and the United States. There are at least eleven different dialects that show some sort of correspondence to the Mortlock Island groups.

== Classification ==
Mortlockese is an Austronesian language currently holding a 6b* language status, meaning that it is threatened with extinction. More specifically, a language is given the 6b language status when it is only used for in-person communication (i.e., not written language), with a decline in the number of speakers. In the nuclear Micronesian languages, Mortlockese Language falls under the Chuukic category. One factor contributing to the present endangerment of Mortlockese are natural disasters, such as the typhoon that struck the Mortlock Islands in 1907. Such natural disasters can kill many speakers of Mortlockese, and since the language is primarily transmitted orally, many outlets for passing on the culture and language to youth are removed.

== History ==
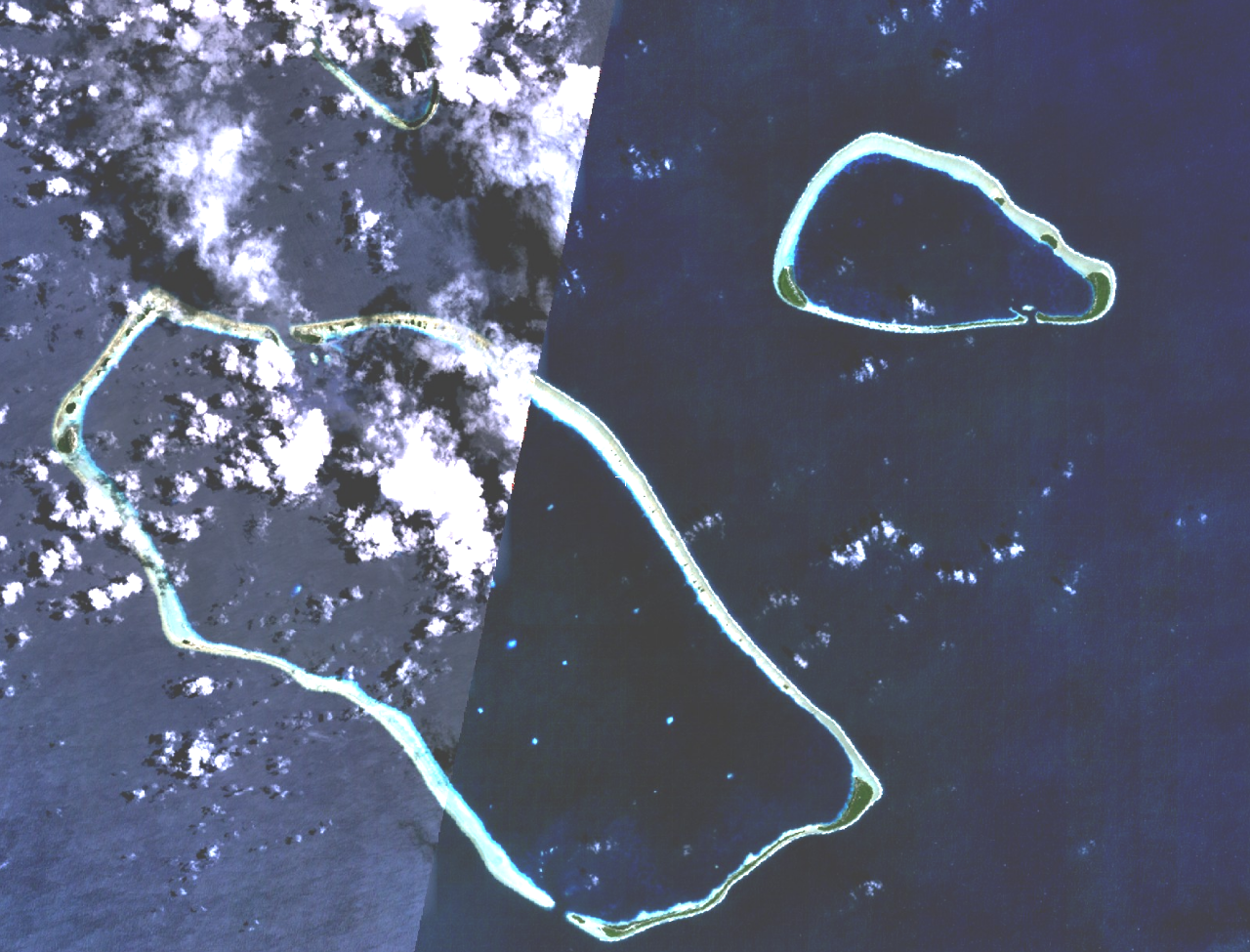
Image of Mortlock Islands taken by satellite

The Mortlock islands, where Mortlockese is mainly spoken, is estimated to have had its first settlement around eight hundred to nine hundred years ago. There is evidence showing that the Mortlockese Language originated from the Chuuk Lagoon since many Mortlock natives trace their history back to the Chuuk Lagoon islands. Along with the genealogies, many clans that exist in the Mortlock islands also exist in the Chuuk Lagoon islands. In 1907, there was a typhoon that hit the Mortlock island Ta which caused the people there to move to Saipan and Pohnpei. Now, Mortlockese Language speakers can be found not only on the Mortlock islands, but also on Saipan and Pohnpei.

Documenting the language by writing it down was uncommon; instead, stories were passed down orally, which leads to less available documented history. Children learned from their parents and the stories told by relatives. The main role of girls growing up was to help their mothers and learn household tasks. For the boys, more "masculine" tasks such as fishing were promoted. Family life was important, and obedience was widely accepted by children in fear of a supernatural power punishing them. Myths and folktales told stories of religious and cultural beliefs passed down. Family is important to the Mortlock natives. Family structure is important and different rules are followed depending on the different islands. In several cases, the woman is head of the family. Sleeping arrangements may mean men in large homes separate from the women and children. Friendships are also extremely important within the Mortlockese culture. Friendship was more of a "brotherhood". It is noted that if a friendship was formed between two people, each of the other's family members became family as well.

As early as January 1874, missionaries visited the islands and began building schools to teach the natives religious ways of life. Their main efforts were to increase awareness of Puritanism. European clothes were introduced, as well as the prohibition of drugs and alcohol. There was concern of children in school falling out of touch with their native ways. The history and traditions of the Natives was approved and a new course was updated and continued for years. According to several documents, several changes to the curriculum were made to incorporate native traditions as well as to introduce new information from the Europeans.

The most common historical belief is that the Mortlock people arrived on the islands in canoes. Over the span of the 19th century, traders continued to document their visits to the islands allowing evidence of residency.

In 1907 a typhoon hit the Mortlock islands, destroying homes, and killing hundreds. Natural disasters, war, and other changes to the islands are to blame for the little to no documentation of the Mortlock history and language. What is left is the writings of missionaries who visited the island to teach the word of God, and to translate the Mortlockese Language into biblical text. There are documents of what curriculum was taught in the schools opened, as well as the number of students and teachers present. There are also certain rules that are noted in several cases implying that words are not always what they seem. In terms of family and kinship, personal names were used when referring to family instead of terms like "cousin", or "grandparent". Kinship terms categorize relatives instead of label them directly. This is just one example of grammar we can study from the way the Mortlockese language is designed.

== Dialects ==
There are eleven different dialects in the Mortlockese Language and according to researchers, speakers of Mortlockese can tell the difference between the different Mortlockese dialects. Most of these differences are in how words sound and how the spellings of words differ.

Word	Piis-Emwmwar	Lukunosh	Satawan	Té
chicken	mélúk	malek	malek	malak
to go	ló	la	ló	ló
inside	llón	llan	llón	llón
to sleep	méúr	maur	maúr	méúr
to go with	eeti	itei	iti / eti	etei
land	fénú	fanéú	fanú	fénú
from	sengi	sangei	sangi	sengei
large ant sp.	uukéch	ukash	ukosh	ukésh
dog	kolaak	kómwia	komwia	kitti
Monday	Saranfál	Mástánfal	Saranfál	Mistánfél
Tuesday	Aruwou	Aruwowan	Aruwowan	Ráán Ruwou
Saturday	Ammól	Ráán Amwól	Ráán Amwól	Ráán Ukumw
fly (insect)	mechchang	lóóng	lóóng	pitiring
small ant sp.	lúúlú	lengeleng	likúkkútong / lengúleng	lúlú

== Geographic distribution ==
Map of the Federated States of Micronesia

The Mortlockese language is spoken in the Chuuk state. It is spoken in eleven distinct dialects over the eleven Mortlock Islands (Ettal, Kutt, Lekinioch, Losap, Moch, Nama, Namoluk, Oneop, Piis-Emwar, Satowan, Ta), all of which have mutual intelligibility. Speakers of Mortlockese are able to discern where other speakers are from, whether a different island or a different village, based on nuanced variations in speech patterns. There are approximately five to seven thousand speakers of the language, located mostly on the Mortlock Islands and throughout Micronesia, but also on the Pacific Islands (Hawaii and Guam in particular) and in the United States of America. In March 1907, in the wake of destruction caused by a typhoon that struck the Mortlock island Ta killing half the population there, the Mortlock people living on that island relocated to Saipan and Pohnpei. On Pohnpei, the Mortlocks spoke one of three Mortlockese dialects along with Pohnpeian or English as a second language in the multilingual community they formed. After a number of years, Mortlockese people living in Pohnpei returned to Pakin Atoll in the Mortlock Islands, where they spoke the kapsen Mwoshulok dialect, exhibiting adaptation and evolution, while retaining Pohnpeian as a second language. English is the national language in the Mortlock islands; however, most only use it when interacting with people from other places or in school. Rather than English, Mortlockese and Pohnpeian are the common spoken languages. The Lukunosh dialect is one of the southernmost Mortlockese dialects.

== Phonology ==
Lukunosh, a dialect of Mortlockese, has nine vowel phonemes and 15 consonant phonemes.

Vowel phonemes
	Front	Central	Back
High	i	ʉ	u
High-mid			o
Low-mid	ɛ	ɞ	ɔ
Low	æ	a	

Consonant phonemes
	Bilabial		Dental/ Alveolar	Alveo- palatal	Velar
	plain	labialized	Dental/ Alveolar	Alveo- palatal	Velar
Plosive	p	pʷ	t̪	tʃ	k
Nasal	m	mʷ	n		ŋ
Fricative	f		s	ʃ	
Trill			r		
Approximant		w	l	j	

Gemination is possible for all consonants.

Syllables are in the form of (C)(C)V(V)(C)(C), where (C) is an optional consonant and (V) is an optional vowel. An example of a CCVVCC syllable is so.ko.ppaat (meaning assorted in Lukunosh Mortlockese).

=== Reduplication ===
Reduplication occurs in some verbs to express extreme measure. It may also indicate an imperfective or habitual aspect.

{/ŋiimw alɛɛtɛj/} $\rightarrow$ {/ŋii~mw al~mw alɛɛtɛj/}
{hate him/her/it} {} {really hate him/her/it'}

/jææjæ/ $\rightarrow$ /jæj~jææjæ/
{to use something} {} {to use something repeatedly or habitually}

== Grammar ==
The different dialects of Mortlockese have varying degrees of place deixis. For example, Lukunosh Mortlockese as spoken in Pukin has four levels of deixis (near speaker, near listener, far from speaker and listener, in the minds of speaker and listener) while Kúttú Mortlockese has five levels.

In addition to common nouns and proper nouns are relational nouns, which are further divided into three categories: oblique, locational, and partitive.

Subject markers help to interpret either anaphoric arguments or grammatical agreements. Object markers show the third person singular object suffix where there is an overt object. Both the third person singular object suffix and the other non third person singular object suffixes act as an anaphoric agreement when there is no overt object.

=== Noun phrases ===
A noun phrase is at minimum a bare noun. This bare noun can then be modified by demonstratives, possessive, and numeral classifiers. It is also possible to attach the stative TAM marker /mii/ after a bare noun and then add an adjective. An example is /uuʃ/ 'banana' turning into /uuʃ mii par/ 'red banana'. The structure of noun phrases generally follow the form: (Numeral) (possessive) (noun) (possessive suffix) (demonstrative suffix) (stative) (adjective). (pg.129)

=== Verb phrases ===
Verb phrases follow the form (Proclitic prefix) (subject) (TAM marker) (optional adverb) (verb) (suffix) (directional suffix) (object or noun), giving Mortlockese an SVO sentence structure. Subject pronouns used in the sentence are followed by an aspect morpheme, with only one aspect morpheme per clause. The only preposition used in the Mortlockese language is /mɞ/.

== Nouns ==
Common or base nouns have no prefixes or suffixes and can be used with classifiers for counting. They can also be further categorized by possessive classifiers which indicate the relationship between the possessor and object as being indirect or alienable, and possessive suffixes are used to indicate direct or inalienable possession. Some nouns also indicate the specific use for the object in question, including the nature of how it is to be used by the subject in a sentence. Nouns can be modified by adjectives, demonstratives, and numeral classifiers and modified nouns will usually undergo vowel lengthening from (C)(V)(C) to (C)(V)(V)(C). Types of nouns in Mortlockese include proper nouns, relational nouns (which cannot be modified and are used to indicate inalienable possession), oblique nouns, locational nouns, and partitive nouns.

== Verbs ==
=== Intransitive verbs ===
Intransitive verbs in Mortlockese are described by two separate classes. The first class is "unaccusatives", which are linked to adjectives and can show that the object is undergoing a process or action. The other class is "unergatives", which are more like actual verbs in that they describe actions rather than a state of being. Both types of intransitive verbs have related transitive verb forms.

=== Transitive verbs ===
Transitive verbs require the use of direct object suffixes which reference the object of the phrase. These include prepositional verbs, which are used with a direct object suffix and are not used with causatives or reduplication to indicate different aspects. Transitive verbs in Mortlockese can be used alone or followed by a direct object noun phrase in a clause.

== Adverbs ==
Adverbs can come before or after the verb in a sentence. Combining an adjective with the morpheme /lɛ/ and a verb will result in a form that roughly translates to the form of an English adverb ending with "-ly".

== Pronouns ==
Four types of pronouns are used in Mortlockese. The first type, independent pronouns, can be used either as the subject or direct object of a phrase or sentence. Different variations or forms may be used or preferred in the different dialects, but all of the forms are interchangeable. Subject proclitics are used to indicate the number of persons being talked about as the subject. An example of linguistic metathesis is shown in the variation of the third-person plural subject proclitic pronoun /ɛr=/ to /rɛ=/ where the use of either is accepted, but an individual speaker will only choose to use one form. Direct object suffix pronouns are used to indicate the number of persons being talked about as the direct object of a phrase or sentence. Lastly, possessive suffix pronouns are used to indicate the number of possessors and the relationship between the speaker and the possessor. A verb can be combined with causative prefixes, transitive third-person direct object suffixes and thematic vowels (the inclusion of which depends on whether the ending of the verb is a vowel or a consonant) to create descriptive clauses that include pronouns. The different dialects will have different ways of modifying verbs and pronouns; likewise, generational differences yield different forms of word modifications. Independent pronouns are used in response to WH questions.

== Demonstratives ==
Singular and plural demonstratives are used to indicate proximity to the speaker or listener, and what number of objects there are. These words have the English equivalents of "this", "that", "here", "there", and the like. These can also be modified to indicate other qualities of the subject, such as in recalling something from the past that is not present with the speakers at the time they choose to discuss it.

== Conjunctions ==
The two types of conjunctions in Mortlockese are subordinators and coordinators.

== Possessive classifiers ==
The possessive classifier acts as the base of the word, and indicates the relationship of the possessum noun to the possessor. The general possessive classifier in Lukunosh is [jaa-].

=== Possessive suffixes ===
1SG	-j
2SG	-m^{w}
3SG	-
1 PL.INCL	-ʃ
1 PL.EXCL	-mam
2PL	-mi
3PL	-r
CONST	-n

When attaching possessive suffixes to consonant-final words, a vowel is placed between the final consonant and the suffix. An example is [maas] (eye, face) becoming [masan] (their eye, face). The form [masn] is phonetically possible in Mortlockese, but is deemed impossible by speakers.

== Vocabulary ==
Certain words cannot be spoken in the presence of the opposite sex. This gender-restrictive vocabulary, sometimes called cookhouse speech, may only be used when speaking to people of the same gender. This gender-restrictive vocabulary shows an example of avoidance speech, a type of honorific, in the Mortlockese Language. Mortlockese is a matrilineal society, considering the patrilineal lineage as secondary. The Mortlockese vocabulary includes terms to denote siblings and cousins of the same gender, and different terms to refer siblings and cousins of the opposite gender. Verbs can be transitive, intransitive (unergative or unaccusative), or semitransitive.

=== Numbers ===
The counting system in Mortlockese is a base 10 system. The following table includes the numbers used in serial counting, which can also be modified by numeral classifiers.

Number	Mortlockese
1	eu-
2	ruwou-
3	elú-
4	ruanu-
5	limou-
6	wonou-
7	fúsú-
8	walú-
9	tiwou-

Serial counting requires use of the prefix "e-" and use of any number with a classifier changes the word of "one" from "-e" to "-te". Numeral classifiers are used to relate an object's characteristics, and examples include "-man" for the counting of animate subjects, "-faú" for round-shaped objects, and "-shé" for objects that are long. Possessive classifiers are used to indicate the relationship between a number of objects and the possessor of the objects.

== Relevant academic literature ==
- Combs, Martin. "A spectrographic analysis of a voiceless retroflexed fricative in the Mortlockese language". Working papers in Linguistics: University of Hawai ‘i at Mānoa 13, no. 3 (1981): 1-8.
- Odango, Emerson Lopez. "The status of subject and object markers in Pakin Lukunosh Mortlockese". Oceanic Linguistics (2014): 110-135.
- Odango, Emerson Lopez. "Affeu fangani'join together': A morphophonemic analysis of possessive suffix paradigms and a discourse-based ethnography of the elicitation session in Pakin Lukunosh Mortlockese". PhD diss., University of Hawai'i at Manoa, 2015.
- Umwech, Marcellino. "MORTLOCKESE ORTHOGRAPHIES & DICTIONARIES with Major Additional Comments on Lagoon Trukese". In Vernacular Language Symposium on New & Developing Orthographies in Micronesia, 1989, Guam, p. 33. University of Guam Press, 1990.
