= Typhoon Pamela (1976) =

Pacific typhoon in 1976

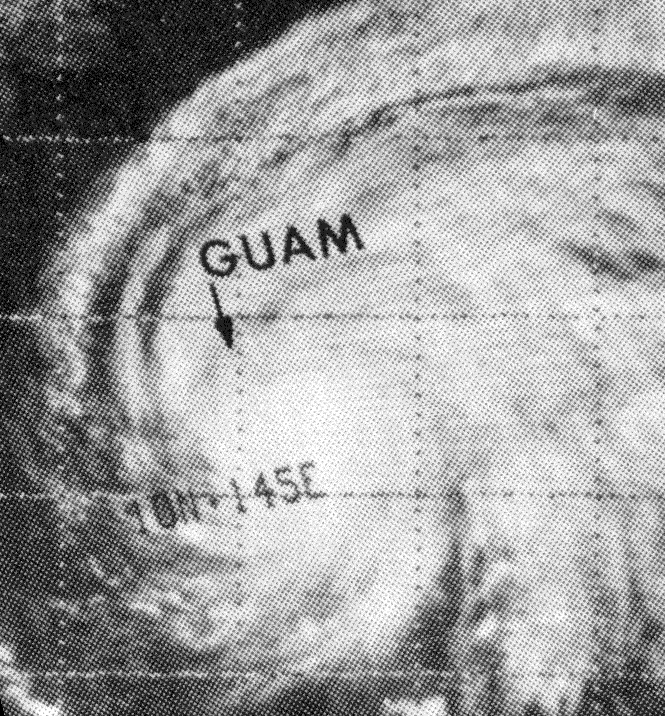
- Image of Pamela near Guam

Meteorological history
- Formed: May 14, 1976
- Extratropical: May 27, 1976
- Dissipated: June 1, 1976

Typhoon
- 10-minute sustained (JMA)
- Lowest pressure: 920 hPa (mbar); 27.17 inHg

Category 4-equivalent super typhoon
- 1-minute sustained (SSHWS/JTWC)
- Highest winds: 240 km/h (150 mph)
- Lowest pressure: 921 hPa (mbar); 27.20 inHg

Overall effects
- Fatalities: 11
- Damage: $500 million (1976 USD)
- Areas affected: Caroline Islands, Chuuk, Guam, Saipan, Iwo Jima
- IBTrACS
- Part of the 1976 Pacific typhoon season

Typhoon Pamela was a powerful typhoon that struck the U.S. territory of Guam in May 1976, causing about $500 million in damage (USD). The sixth named storm and third typhoon of the 1976 Pacific typhoon season, Pamela developed on May 14 from a trough in the Federated States of Micronesia in the area of the Nomoi Islands. It executed a counterclockwise loop and slowly intensified, bringing heavy rains to the islands in the region. Ten people died on Chuuk due to a landslide. After beginning a steady northwest motion toward Guam, Pamela attained its peak winds of 240 km/h (150 mph).

On May 21, the large eye of the typhoon crossed Guam, producing typhoon-force winds (greater than 118 km/h or 73 mph) for a period of 18 hours. An estimated 80% of the buildings on the island were damaged to some degree, including 3,300 houses that were destroyed. Pamela's slow motion produced 856 mm (33.7 in) of rainfall, making May 1976 the wettest month on record in Guam. Despite the high damage, well-executed warnings kept the death toll to only one. After affecting the island, the typhoon weakened and turned northeastward, passing near Iwo Jima before becoming an extratropical cyclone.

== Meteorological history ==
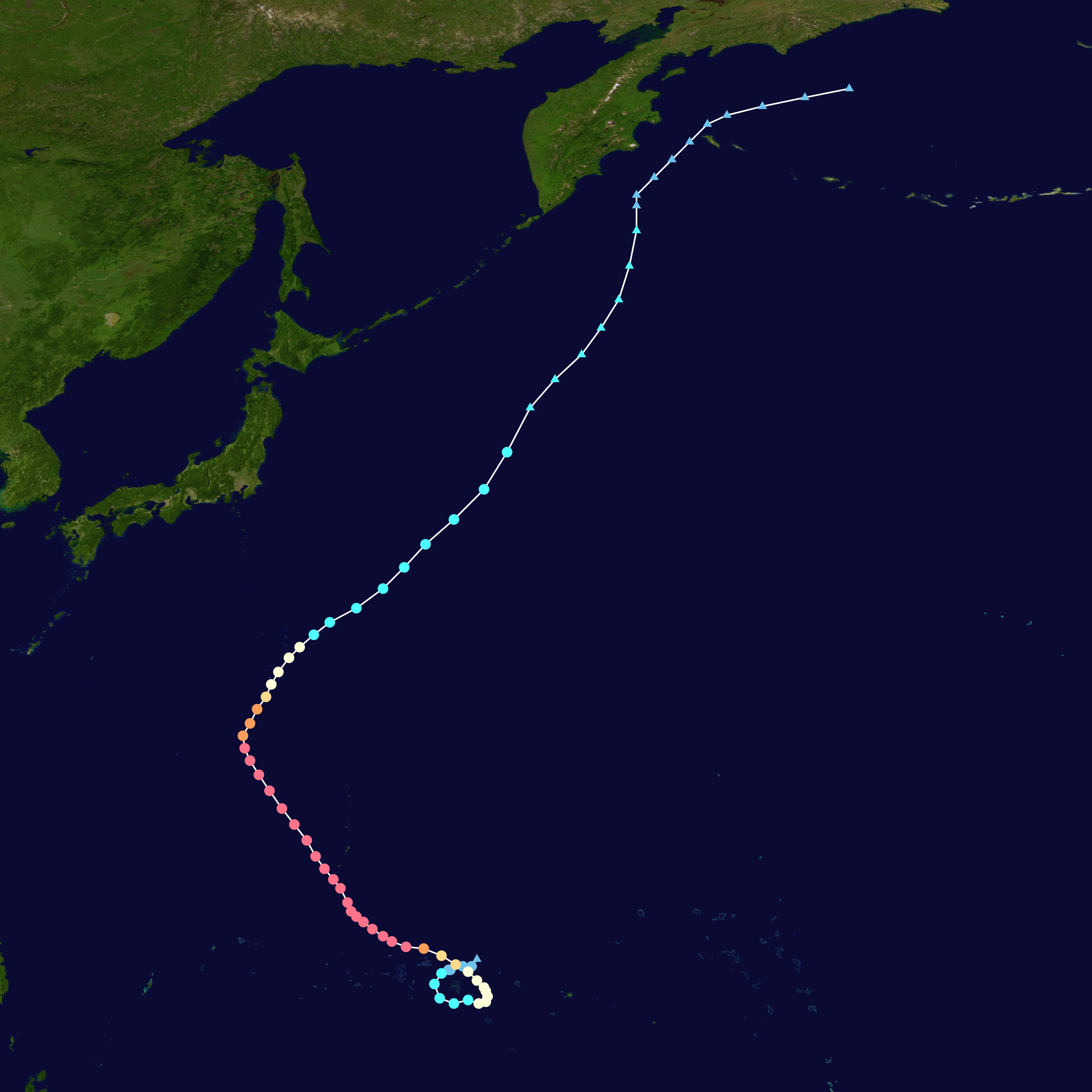
Map plotting the storm's track and intensity, according to the Saffir–Simpson scale Map key Saffir–Simpson scale Tropical depression (≤38 mph, ≤62 km/h) Tropical storm (39–73 mph, 63–118 km/h) Category 1 (74–95 mph, 119–153 km/h) Category 2 (96–110 mph, 154–177 km/h) Category 3 (111–129 mph, 178–208 km/h) Category 4 (130–156 mph, 209–251 km/h) Category 5 (≥157 mph, ≥252 km/h) Unknown Storm type Tropical cyclone Subtropical cyclone Extratropical cyclone, remnant low, tropical disturbance, or monsoon depression

The origins of Typhoon Pamela were from a tropical disturbance that persisted in the eastern end of the equatorial trough on May 13. At the time, it was located about 425 km (264 mi) north of Chuuk in the Federated States of Micronesia. The disturbance was initially difficult to locate as it tracked generally to the south and southwest, a motion caused by a southward-moving tropical upper tropospheric trough. On May 14, the Japan Meteorological Agency (JMA) indicated that the system developed into a tropical cyclone. That same day, the Joint Typhoon Warning Center (JTWC) followed suit and classified it as Tropical Depression 06W. The next day, aircraft reconnaissance data from the 54th Weather Reconnaissance Squadron indicated that the depression intensified into Tropical Storm Pamela. It was able to intensify after the trough receded northward, developing outflow. The storm turned to the south and east, gradually executing a counterclockwise loop through the FSM. This was due to a building ridge between Pamela and Typhoon Olga to its west. On May 16, observations from Satawan in the Caroline Islands indicated that Pamela attained typhoon status, which is a tropical cyclone with maximum sustained winds of at least 118 km/h (73 mph). This was confirmed the next day by aircraft observations.

Upon attaining typhoon status, Pamela was a small tropical cyclone with a central dense overcast spanning 280 km (170 mi) in diameter. After completing its counterclockwise loop, the typhoon began a slow motion to the northwest, once the ridge to its west diminished. On May 18, it passed within 95 km (59 mi) of Chuuk, and around that time Pamela developed a circular eye about 18 km (11 mi) in diameter. The typhoon steadily intensified as it began a more steady northwest movement due to a ridge to its east, and on May 19 Pamela attained peak winds of 240 km/h (150 mph) about 485 km (301 mi) southeast of Guam. At that time, it had gusts to 295 km/h (183 mph).

Typhoon Pamela maintained peak intensity for about 18 hours, during which time a reconnaissance plane reported an atmospheric pressure of 921 millibars (27.2 inHg) at the surface; the aircraft also reported concentric eyewalls. The JMA estimated the minimum pressure was slightly lower at 920 millibars (27 inHg). A trough passing to its north caused the typhoon to turn more to the north-northwest. Around 0400 UTC on May 21, the eyewall of Pamela struck southeastern Guam with winds of about 220 km/h (140 mph). Over a three-hour period, the 37 km (23 mi) wide eye crossed the island. After leaving the island, Pamela continued steadily northwestward for two days while maintaining its intensity. On May 23, it turned to the north and northeast due to a break in the subtropical ridge. The typhoon passed 28 km (17 mi) east of Iwo Jima with winds of 140 km/h (87 mph). As Pamela accelerated over cooler waters and into an area of higher wind shear, it rapidly weakened and was downgraded to a tropical storm on May 25. The next day, the storm became extratropical, which lasted until June 1 before dissipating over the Bering Sea.

== Preparations and impact ==
Pamela first presented a threat to Guam on May 16 when it first attained typhoon status. All subsequent forecasts anticipated the typhoon would pass within 185 km (115 mi). In response to Pamela's approach, Guam was placed under Typhoon Condition of Readiness III (TCCOR 3) on May 18. This was upgraded to TCCOR II on later that day, and TCCOR I the next day. The Navy and Air Force evacuated assets. Before the typhoon's arrival, officials advised residents to store water prior to the storm's arrival. About 2,100 people in vulnerable wooden homes were evacuated to storm shelters set up in schools and public offices.

=== Chuuk islands ===
While passing between the Losap and Namoluk atolls in the Mortlock Islands, Pamela produced winds of over 102 km/h (63 mph). Different communities experienced differing levels of damage from the storm. The islands of Etal, Namoluk, and Kutu received the most damage as storm waves submerged these islands for over 15 to 18 hours. Across these islands, the typhoon left heavy crop and reef damage. Islands such as Satawan and Lukunor received more moderate damage from the storm. No deaths were reported in the Morlock Islands.

From May 17 to 18, at the Weather Service on Chuuk, Pamela dumped 14.59 in (371 mm) of rain. The rains resulted in mudslide that killed 10 people on Moen, many of whom lived in a single buried house; several people were also injured. Winds reached 91 km/h (56 km/h).

=== Mariana Islands ===
The typhoon produced tropical-storm force gusts and 10 in (250 mm) of rain on Saipan. The impact there was minor.

While slowly crossing Guam, Pamela produced winds of over 185 km/h (115 mph) across the entire island over a six-hour period, causing widespread heavy damage. Typhoon-force winds were reported for 18 hours, and tropical storm-force winds were reported for 30 hours. As the eye was crossing the island, the winds rapidly vacillated between gusts of 150 km/h (93 mph) to calmness in the span of a few minutes; this created a large pressure gradient that caused additional damage. The typhoon dropped a total of 856 mm (33.7 in) of rainfall, including 690 mm (27 in) in a 24-hour period, on the island. This contributed to May 1976 being Guam's wettest month on record.

In Apra Harbor, ten ships or tugs were sunk, as were numerous smaller vessels. One of the ships that survived in the harbor was the cutter Basswood of the Coast Guard, which recorded a wind gust of 220 km/h (140 mph). Pamela's damage prevented regular flights in and out of the island.

The typhoon left extensive damage to military and civilian properties on the island, estimated at $500 million (1976 USD). Trees were also uprooted throughout the island. Although Pamela was not as strong as Typhoon Karen in 1962, it proved more costly due to its slow movement. Concrete buildings largely survived the storm, but power lines and wooden structures were devastated. The typhoon cut off all public utilities on the island as well as Guam's two radio stations. The American Red Cross estimated that Pamela destroyed 3,300 houses and significantly damaged another 3,200. Government officials preliminarily estimated that 80% of the buildings were damaged to some degree, of which half were destroyed. Overall, 14,000 families sustained damage during the storm. About 300 people on the island were injured, and although the Red Cross reported three fatalities, the JTWC reported only one death in Guam in the year-end report. The low death total was attributed to timely warnings and forecasts.

== Aftermath ==
The disruption on Guam was significant enough that the JTWC's backup location at Yokota Air Base in Japan assumed forecasting and warning responsibilities for five days starting on May 20. The cleanup and recovery took months, assisted by military personnel. During the aftermath, food shortages resulted in long lines for aid at Andersen Air Force Base. Due to Pamela as well as the occurrence of other disasters in 1976, the American Red Cross went into debt, after providing about $10 million in assistance to 16,000 families. The agency set up 29 shelters for 2,600 people.

On May 22, a day after the typhoon struck the island, U.S. President Gerald Ford declared Guam a major disaster area. In September 1976, the United States Senate passed a bill that included aid for the storm victims. Ultimately, the U.S. government provided $200 million in aid and reconstruction funding in the two years following the typhoon's passage. This included about $80 million to repair Guam's military facilities, which took several years to complete. Following the typhoon's passage and through the 1980s, the island's wooden homes underwent the process of being replaced by safer concrete homes.

== See also ==
- Other systems of the same name
- Typhoon Isa (1997)
- Typhoon Francisco (2013)
