= Effects of Typhoon Bopha in the Caroline Islands =

Typhoon Bopha
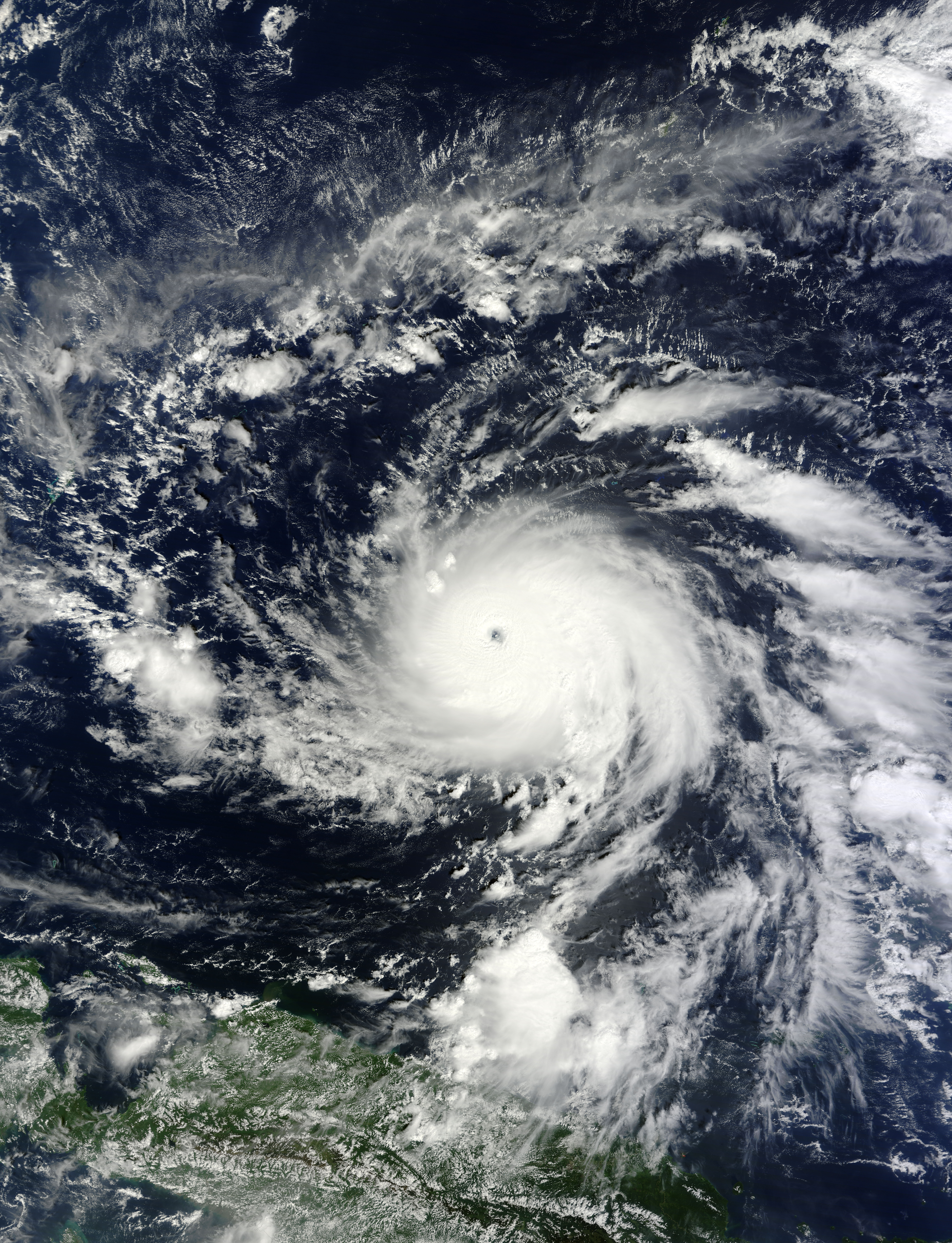
- Bopha strengthening over Micronesia on December 1

Meteorological history
- Date: November 25 — December 3, 2012

Very strong typhoon
- 10-minute sustained (JMA)
- Highest winds: 185 km/h (115 mph)
- Lowest pressure: 945 hPa (mbar); 27.91 inHg

Category 4-equivalent super typhoon
- 1-minute sustained (SSHWS/JTWC)
- Highest winds: 250 km/h (155 mph)
- Lowest pressure: 922 hPa (mbar); 27.23 inHg

Overall effects
- Fatalities: None
- Damage: $10.1 million (2012 USD)
- Areas affected: Caroline Islands
- Part of the 2012 Pacific typhoon season

The effects of Typhoon Bopha in the Caroline Islands were significant, though limited in extent in comparison to the cyclone's intensity. Typhoon Bopha originated from a tropical depression south of Pohnpei on November 25, 2012, and tracked generally westward for more than a week. During this time, it threatened several islands across Micronesia, prompting the issuance of typhoon watches and warnings. The system skirted the Nomoi Islands on November 28 where it caused limited damage. Thereafter, it became a threat to Palau as an intense typhoon. Residents there boarded up their homes and some evacuated to public shelters while officials enacted a strict curfew during the typhoon's passage. Bopha passed 55 km (34 mi) south of Angaur island, or 100 km (62 mi) south of Babeldaob, on December 2 with winds of 185 km/h (115 mph). (Note: All winds are in ten-minute sustained standards unless otherwise noted.)

Damage was most severe in the states of Angaur, Melekeok, Ngiwal, and Ngaraard where storm surge damaged or destroyed many homes. Electricity and water service in many areas was lost during the storm, and remained so for over a week in the hardest hit areas. Throughout Palau, 92 homes were destroyed while 59 others sustained severe damage. Total damage amounted to US$10.1 million with repair costs estimated at US$15–20 million. A state of emergency was declared on December 5 while the Palau Red Cross Society assisted with recovery efforts. Palau's congress allocated US$10 million for relief while international donors provided a collective US$235,000 in aid.

== Preparations ==
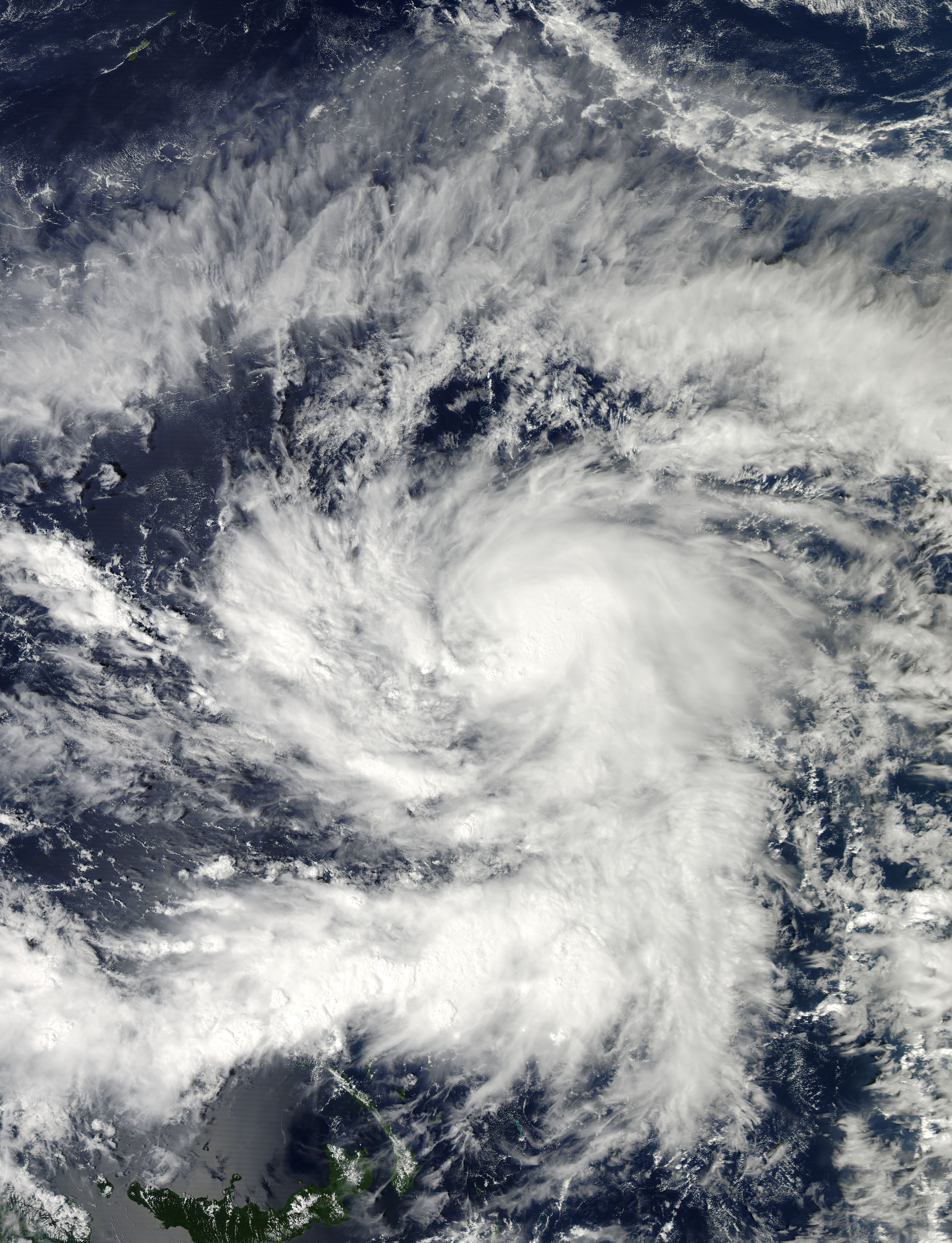
Tropical Storm Bopha organizing near Micronesia on November 28

Upon the Joint Typhoon Warning Center's declaration of Tropical Depression 26W on November 26, a tropical storm watch was issued for Nukuoro and Lukunor in the FSM. Hours later, the watch was superseded by a tropical storm warning while new watches were declared for Losap and Chuuk. The watch was expanded during the afternoon of November 27 to include Poluwat. As the storm moved westward through the FSM and intensified on November 28, a typhoon watch was issued for Woleai; tropical storm warnings for the Nomoi Islands, Poluwat, and Satawal; a tropical storm watch was also put in place for Faraulep. Throughout November 29, watches and warnings were discontinued across the FSM, with all being canceled by the evening hours. During the morning of November 30, the remaining advisories were discontinued; however, new typhoon watches were issued for Koror, Ngulu Atoll, and a tropical storm watch for Yap and Sonsorol.

Prior to the storm's arrival, the Micronesia Red Cross Society began stockpiling relief materials on Yap and Chuuk. Emergency communication testing, via satellite phones, was also conducted with regional offices. On November 30, residents in Palau were urged to secure their homes in preparation for the typhoon. They were also advised to stock up on emergency supplies that would last for at least three days. The storm delayed shipment of emergency food supplies to a boarding school on a remote island in Micronesia.

Beginning on November 27 and continuing through December 3, the National Emergency Management Office in Palau issued more than ten detailed public announcements warning residents of the approaching storm and how to prepare. In response, numerous families boarded up their homes and sought refuge in the 45 public shelters opened across the republic. On December 1, a United States Navy vessel arrived in Palau in case requests for assistance were made after the storm. As a precautionary measure, the nations electric grid was shut down at 6:00 p.m. local time on December 2. All flights to and from Roman Tmetuchl International Airport were suspended during the morning of December 3. A strict curfew was put in place for the city of Koror for the duration of the typhoon.

== Impact ==
Across the Federated States of Micronesia, the impact of the typhoon was limited. Winds on Nukuoro were estimated at 45–75 km/h (28–47 mph). Some buildings sustained minor damage, resulting in $7,500 in costs. Numerous crops, primarily bananas, papayas, and breadfruit, were damaged or blown down, resulting in $2,500 in damage. There was minor coastal flooding. No injuries occurred. Damages totalled $10,000.

During the early hours of December 3, Typhoon Bopha made its closest approach to Palau, bringing heavy rains and strong winds to much of the archipelago. Winds up to 215 km/h (134 mph) impacted Angaur and 160 km/h (99 mph) in Peleliu. Widespread damage took place across the republic, with the most severe occurring in the states of Angaur, Peleliu, Ngchesar, Melekeok, Ngiwal, and Ngaraard. Initial assessments stated that 92 homes were destroyed and 59 others were severely damaged; however, later reports stated that nearly 200 were destroyed. This left roughly 350 people homeless. Along eastern facing coasts, storm surge caused extensive coastal damage and, in some cases, pushed several hundred feet inland, cutting off roads and leaving behind several feet of debris. Hundreds of residents were forced to evacuate to higher ground as a result of the flooding. According to preliminary reports, Angaur Island experienced extensive damage from the storm. At least six homes were destroyed and travel was severely hampered due to downed trees and debris blocking roads. On Peleliu, eight large coral masses were driven onto the reef surrounding the island. Crops and vegetation across the island sustained heavy damage; however, most homes were reportedly "ok".

On the main island of Babeldaob, the coastal states of Melekeok, Ngiwal, and Ngaraard reported that nearly all homes along the shore were damaged or destroyed by storm surge. Power and water service was almost completely lost across the three states as well. In Koror, wind gusts up to 110 km/h (68 mph) downed trees and power lines. Rainfall at the local National Weather Service office reached 84 mm (3.32 in). Water and power systems across the republic were severely disrupted, with some areas remaining without service more than a week after the storm. Two schools in Ngaraard also sustained severe damage. Despite the severity of the storm, there were no reports of casualties. Across Palau, total damage to crops and property reached U$10.1 million while the cost to repair damage from the storm was estimated at US$15–20 million.

== Aftermath ==
After the storm had moved through the region on December 2, officials began allowing evacuees to return home on December 3. The same day, all airports and roads were re-opened; however, some roads on Koror remained impassable due to damage from storm surge. Additionally, electricity shut off prior to the storm was restored on Koror. On December 5, the President of Palau declared a state of emergency and US$10 million was authorized by congress for relief efforts. The Palau Red Cross Society began distributing clean-up kits and communal tools in the eastern states of Melekeok, Ngaraard, and Ngiwal by December 7. Further distributions on the southern islands of Angaur and Peleliu began the following day. A week after the typhoon's passage, damage assessments across Palau had been completed and authorities had begun a large-scale reconstruction of damaged properties. The operation, known as the Bopha Catastrophe Relief Committee, was being coordinated by Dr. Patrick Tellei, president of Palau Community College. The committee planned to build 30 homes across the republic: 10 in Ngaraard and 5 each in Angaur, Melekeok, Ngiwal, and Peleliu. By December 12, telecommunications and water supplies were 95 percent restored while power had been brought back to 90 percent of capacity. Although water had been restored to most areas by December 13, residents were advised to continue boiling water, especially in more populated locales until further notice. Schools resumed classes on December 17 across the republic; however, several institutions were either temporarily relocated or had half days due to damage from the storm. On December 23, the Government of Palau announced that, "in the holiday spirit", December 24 and 31 would be declared national holidays for 2012 in light of the typhoon. In some areas, residents burned vegetative debris left behind by the storm.

By December 12, Palau received a US$100,000 grant from USAID and US$25,000 from the Bank of Guam for relief efforts. On December 13, the Government of Japan offered ¥5 million (US$60,000) worth of emergency goods, such as jerry cans and water purifiers, through the Japan International Cooperation Agency. The following day, the Republic of Korea provided US$50,000 in humanitarian assistance to Palau through the local Red Cross.

== See also ==
- 2012 Pacific typhoon season
- Typhoon Bopha
- Typhoon Haiyan
- Typhoon Maysak (2015)
