= Namoluk =

Island in Chuuk State, Federal States of Micronesia

Coordinates: 5.9229°N 153.1169°E

Location of Namoluk Atoll in the Pacific Ocean

Namoluk (meaning "lagoon in the middle") is an atoll and municipality in the state of Chuuk, Federated States of Micronesia.

It is the smallest atoll in Micronesia, with a total surface of only 13 km^{2} and a land mass of less than 1 km^{2}. Namoluk is part of the Eastern Islands or [[Middle Mortlock Islands]] group, located about 185 km to the SE of Chuuk and 50 km NW of Etal Atoll.

== History ==
Prior to European colonialism in Micronesia, Namoluk was allied with Ettal, Oneop, and Lukunoch, in wars against Moch, Satawan, Kuttu, and Ta. Occasionally Namoluk would also ally with Nama to battle against Losap. Such alliances shape modern-day sense of identity and community among the different island communities.

The first documented contact of the Namoluk atoll by westerners was in 1827 when Captain Richard Macy sailed by the atoll on the whaleship Henry. The next year, the explorer Fyodor Litke made first foreign contact with the locals aboard the Senyavin. In his account he reported that the locals approached his ship using their canoes and asked if they could explore the ship. Litke and the locals parted on good terms, and whalers and traders started using Micronesian waters more.

== Culture ==
=== Food and diet ===
Prior to the introduction of imported trading goods in the early twentieth century, the people of Namoluk relied on the Pacific Island diet of seafood, fruits such as coconuts and breadfruit, and taro. Occasionally islanders would supplement this with pork, chicken, or sweet potato. The Japanese introduced polished rice and canned fish during their colonial reign, and US exporters introduced other canned meats and turkey tail during the 1960s.

== Islands ==
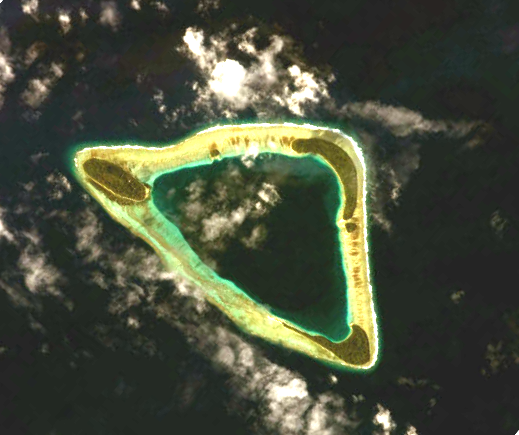
NASA picture of Namoluk Atoll

- Namoluk, located in the NW corner of the atoll, is the main island with 31 ha. Currently it is the only inhabited island and has three villages:
  - Saponwell in the NW
  - Lukolap in the center
  - Pukos in the SE

Other islands:

- Luken 1.5 ha
- Toinom 21 ha
- Umap 1.5 ha
- Amwes located in the SE corner, 28 ha, inhabited until the 1930s, when an epidemic decimated the population. It was never resettled except for a single family. The largest islands have taro fields.

Denver
