= Etal =

Etal or et al may refer to:

- Et al, Latin phrase meaning "and others"
- Etal, Northumberland, village in Northumberland, England
- Etal Atoll, island in Chuuk, Micronesia
- Et al. (New Zealand artist), multimedia artist born Merylyn Tweedie
