= Typhoon Bopha =

Pacific typhoon in 2012

Typhoon Bopha (Pablo)
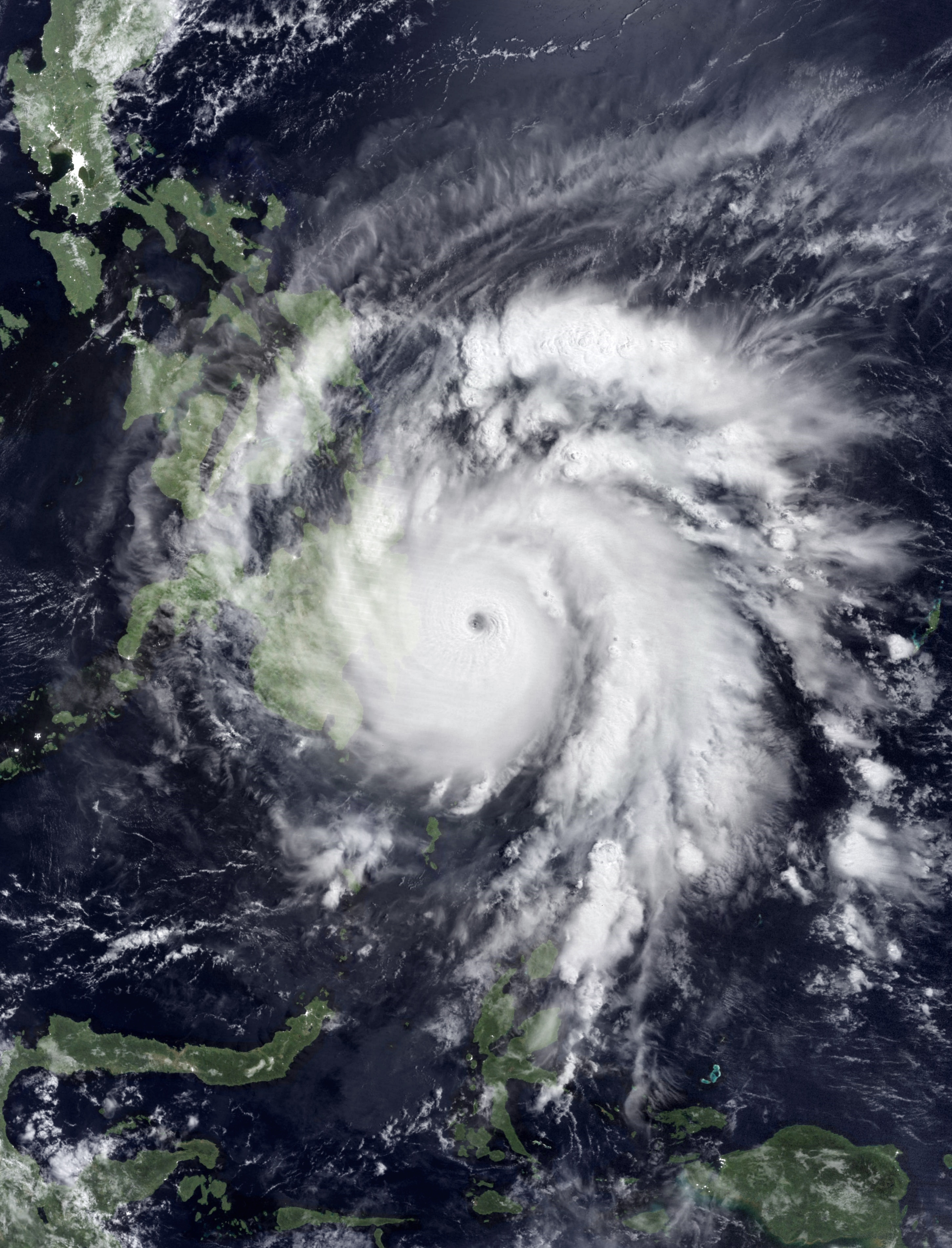
- Typhoon Bopha approaching the Philippines at peak intensity on December 3

Meteorological history
- Formed: November 25, 2012
- Dissipated: December 9, 2012

Very strong typhoon
- 10-minute sustained (JMA)
- Highest winds: 185 km/h (115 mph)
- Lowest pressure: 930 hPa (mbar); 27.46 inHg

Category 5-equivalent super typhoon
- 1-minute sustained (SSHWS/JTWC)
- Highest winds: 280 km/h (175 mph)
- Lowest pressure: 911 hPa (mbar); 26.90 inHg

Overall effects
- Fatalities: 1,901 total
- Damage: $1.16 billion (2012 USD) (Fourth-costliest in Philippine history)
- Areas affected: Caroline Islands, Philippines
- IBTrACS
- Part of the 2012 Pacific typhoon season

Typhoon Bopha, named Pablo by PAGASA, (Note: The Japan Meteorological Agency (JMA) assigns names to typhoons in the western Pacific Ocean and north of the equator, as the Regional Specialized Meteorological Centre. PAGASA assigns local names to tropical cyclones in the Philippine Area of Responsibility.) was a compact but powerful and catastrophic tropical cyclone that became the strongest on record to ever affect the Philippine island of Mindanao, making landfall as a Category 5 super typhoon with winds of 175 mph (282 km/h). The twenty-fourth tropical storm, along with being the fourth and final super typhoon of the 2012 Pacific typhoon season, Bopha originated unusually close to the equator, becoming the second-most southerly Category 5 super typhoon, reaching a minimum latitude of 7.4°N on December 3, 2012, as only Typhoon Louise of 1964 came closer to the equator at this strength, at 7.3°N. After first making landfall in Palau, where it destroyed houses, disrupted communications and caused power outages, flooding and uprooted trees, Bopha made landfall late on December 3 in Mindanao. The storm caused widespread destruction on Mindanao, leaving thousands of people homeless and killing 1,901 people.

After hitting Davao Oriental and Davao de Oro provinces, Bopha shifted through the southern and central regions of Mindanao, cutting power to two provinces and triggering landslides. More than 170,000 people fled to evacuation centers, as the system moved to the South China Sea west of the Palawan island province, eventually dissipating on December 9.

== Meteorological history ==
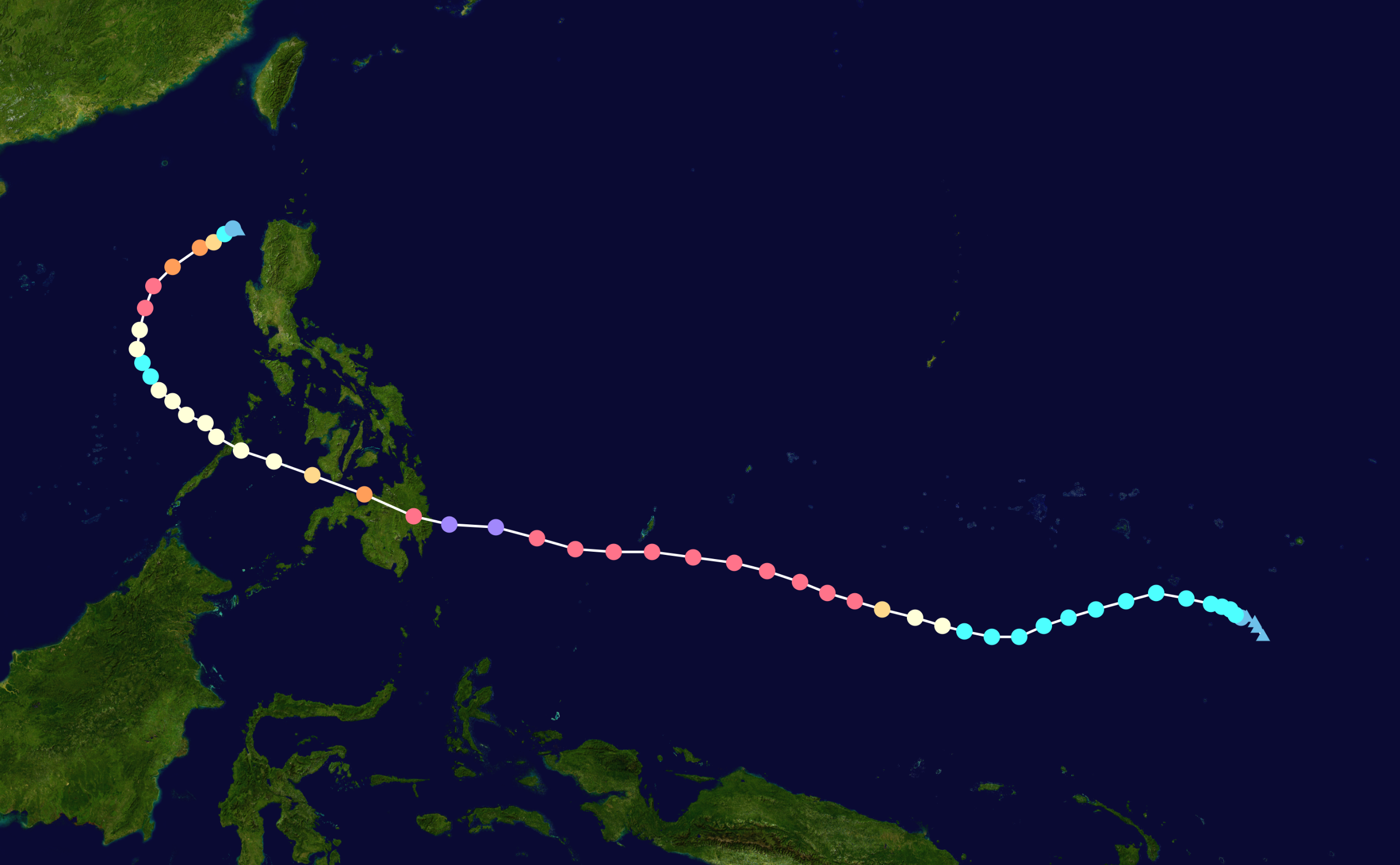
Map plotting the storm's track and intensity, according to the Saffir–Simpson scale Map key Saffir–Simpson scale Tropical depression (≤38 mph, ≤62 km/h) Tropical storm (39–73 mph, 63–118 km/h) Category 1 (74–95 mph, 119–153 km/h) Category 2 (96–110 mph, 154–177 km/h) Category 3 (111–129 mph, 178–208 km/h) Category 4 (130–156 mph, 209–251 km/h) Category 5 (≥157 mph, ≥252 km/h) Unknown Storm type Tropical cyclone Subtropical cyclone Extratropical cyclone, remnant low, tropical disturbance, or monsoon depression

On November 23, the United States Joint Typhoon Warning Center (JTWC) reported that a tropical disturbance had persisted, about 650 km (405 mi) to the south of Pohnpei in the Federated States of Micronesia. At the time, bands of atmospheric convection were flaring around the disturbances poorly defined low-level circulation centre, while the system was located in an area of moderate vertical windshear with sea-surface temperatures of 28–30 °C (82–86 °F). Over the next couple of days, the system's low-level circulation centre slowly consolidated further and came under the influence of a developing anticyclone, which allowed vertical windshear to become more favourable for tropical cyclogenesis. On November 25, the JTWC and the Japan Meteorological Agency (JMA) reported that disturbance had developed into a tropical depression, with the former classifying it as Tropical Depression 26W. At this time the system was located about 530 km (330 mi) to the southeast of Chuuk State and was moving towards the west-northwest, along the southern edge of a subtropical ridge of high pressure that was located to the south of Japan.

On November 26, the movement became nearly stationary as the center organized further. Later that day, the JMA upgraded the depression to a tropical storm named Bopha (1224), (Note: The name Bopha (Khmer: បុប្ផា, [boʔ.pʰɑː]) was contributed by Cambodia and is a feminine given name meaning "flower" in Khmer.) and early on November 27 the JTWC followed suit after a strong burst of thunderstorms over the center. Its westward motion increased on November 28, later becoming west-southwestward. The convection gradually became better organized and wrapped into the center, indicative of a strengthening storm. However, early on November 29 the appearance degraded, with the thunderstorms limited to the southern periphery due to reduced outflow to the south. The circulation became exposed, and the JTWC noted that Bopha was unable to intensify significantly due to its low latitude and correspondingly low Coriolis effect. Late on November 29, convection increased, aided by warm waters and low wind shear. At 00:00 UTC on November 30, the JMA upgraded Bopha to a severe tropical storm. A few hours later, the JTWC upgraded the storm to a typhoon, and the JMA followed suit at 18:00 UTC that day. At that time, Bopha was located about 980 km (610 mi) east-southeast of Palau.

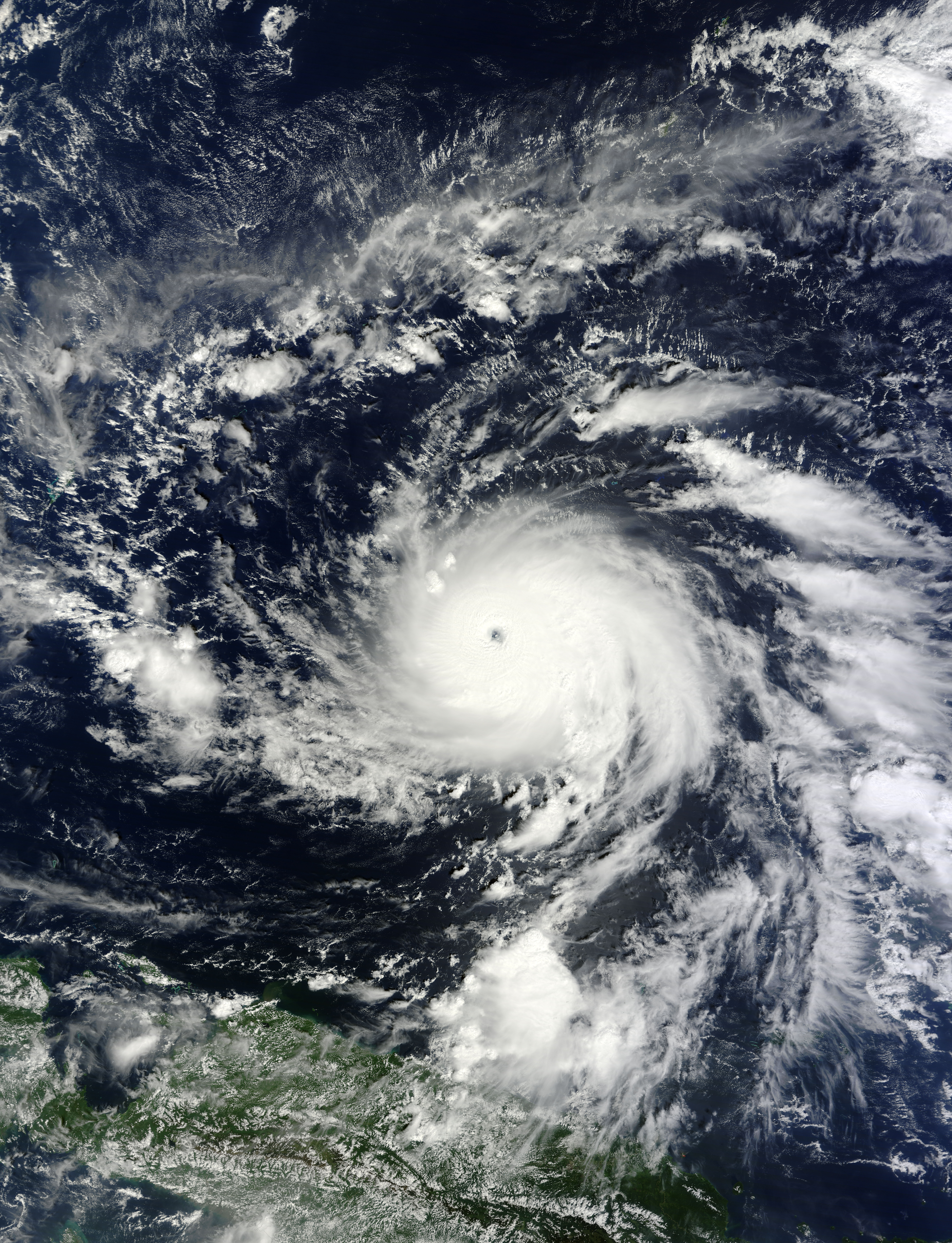
Bopha on December 1, the previous day before its initial peak intensity

As the system continued to intensify, organized bands of thunderstorms began to develop rapidly around the system, mostly on the western half of the storm. They later merged with Bopha, which led to the system's increase in size. Several hot towers also began to rise up near the low level circulation center, with one of the hot towers reaching 17 km (11 mi) into the atmosphere. At around the same time, on November 30, a ragged, eye-like feature appeared in microwave imagery, which later transitioned into a pinhole eye by December 1. The stadium effect was also observed in the thick convection surrounding the eyewall, involving thin strips of clouds from the eyewall curve outward from the surface with height. At around the same time the system's eye structure improved, it began to explosively intensify, becoming a Category 4 storm in 18 hours, while being less than five degrees from the equator.

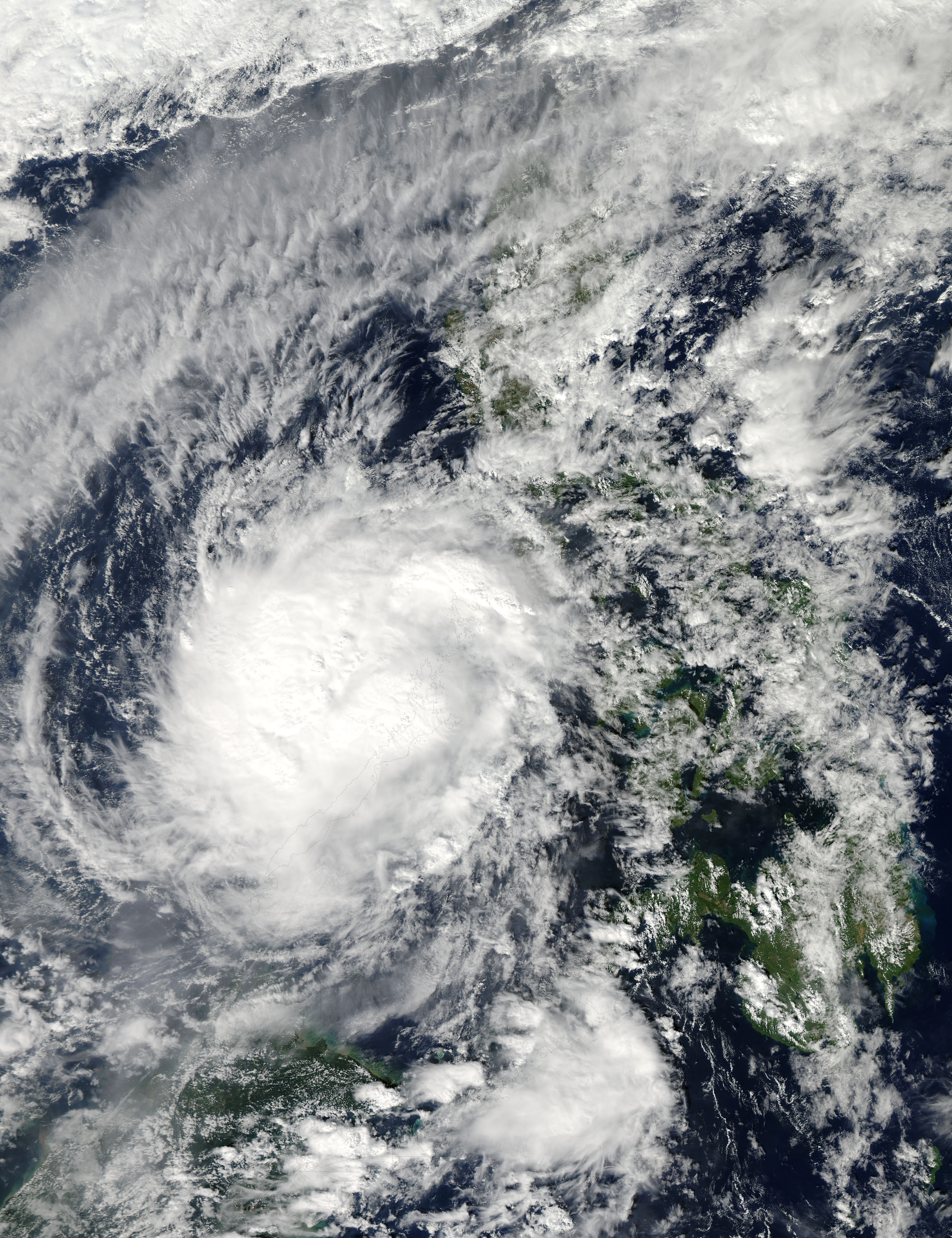
Typhoon Bopha near Palawan on December 5

On December 1, the system, as a Category 4 typhoon, maintained a well defined, small eye, which later dissipated, but reformed by December 2. As Bopha strengthened further into a super typhoon on December 2, the well-defined eye underwent a small eyewall replacement cycle by late December 2, and by 10:00 UTC on December 2, the system developed double eye walls, which were only seen in microwave imagery. AT 12:30 UTC on December 2, Bopha neared Palau, with a closest distance of 50 km (31 mi). At that time, the system's outflow improved, and convection near the eye thickened. Early on December 3, due to the eye wall replacement cycle, the system weakened slightly into a Category 3 typhoon; however, a few hours later, as the eyewall replacement cycle ended, Bopha reintensified into a Category 4 typhoon, while the eye became well-defined again. Late on December 3, as the system continued to strengthen, the system rapidly intensified into a Category 5 super typhoon, deepening to an unofficial pressure of 918 mbar (hPa) (27.11 inHg) as stated by the JTWC at peak intensity, as the eye started to become well defined at 27 km (17 mi) across. The system's convection also became more compact and organized. At that time, an anticyclone located northeast of Bopha continued to provide ample radial outflow and low vertical wind shear over the system, causing favorable conditions, leading to its re-intensification.

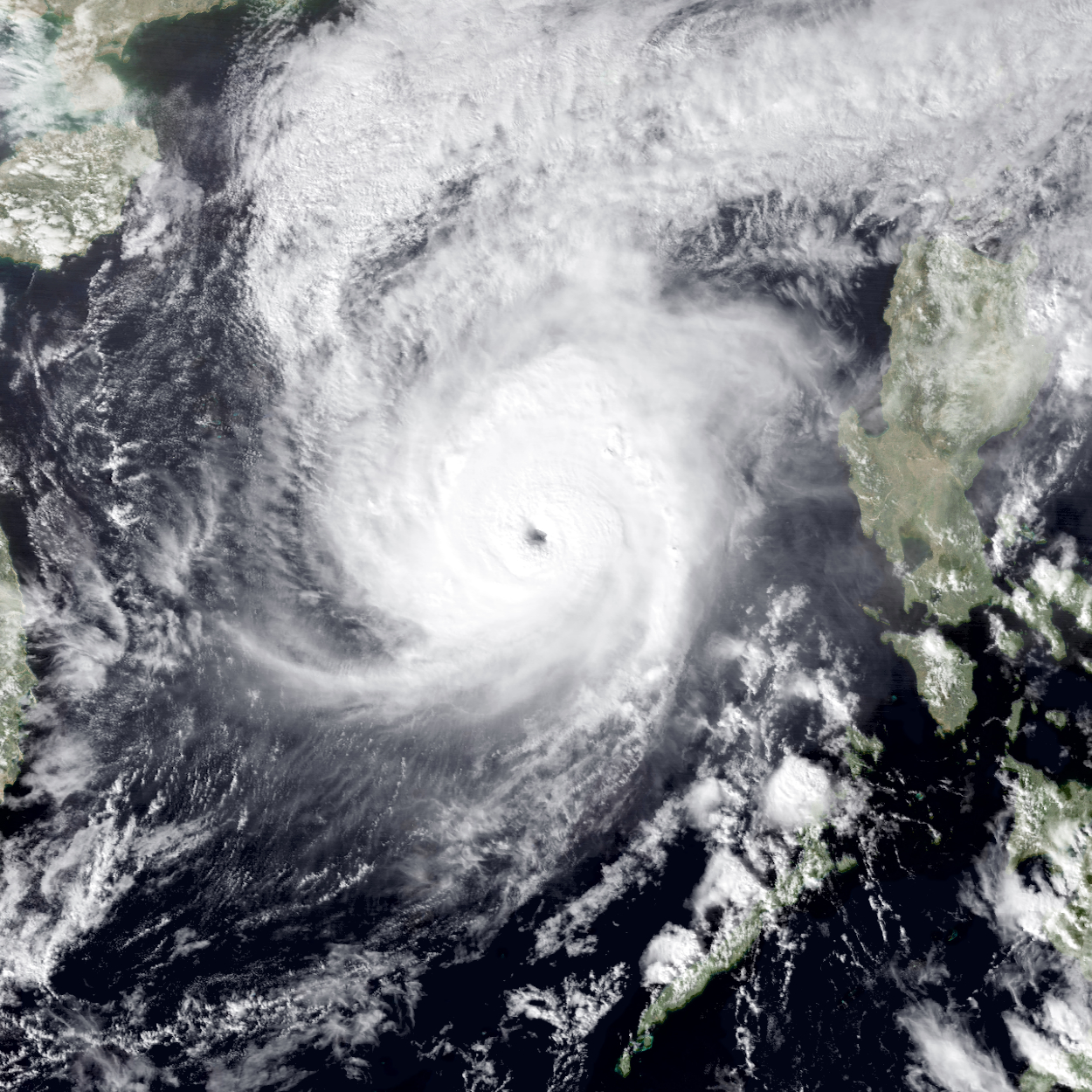
Bopha at its secondary peak intensity in the South China Sea

At 20:45 UTC on December 3 (04:45 December 4 local time), Bopha made landfall over Baganga, Davao Oriental, as a Category 5 super typhoon, and the eye dissipated just an hour after landfall. Bopha began to weaken, with convection on the eastern side of the storm decreasing as it moved through the Sulu Sea. It made landfall on the island of Palawan on December 5, before briefly weakening to a tropical storm on December 6. The JMA continued tracking the system as a typhoon. Overnight, the convection around the storm center weakened, but made another burst on December 7, with an eye-like feature shown only in microwave imagery. After a few hours, the system reintensified into a Category 1 typhoon and developed a 27 km (17 mi), well defined eye.

Late on December 7, Bopha's central dense overcast started to increase slightly, and the typhoon rapidly intensified from a Category 1 to a Category 4 typhoon in only six hours. Upon reintesifying, Bopha developed a well-defined eye that had deep convection near the center of the storm. On December 8, the system started to weaken due to increasing moderate wind shear. Late on December 8 into December 9, Bopha weakened rapidly from a typhoon to a tropical storm, with its convection being blown to the northeast by wind shear, exposing the low level circulation center. The remaining thin convection in the center consisted of few convective thunderstorms associated with stratocumulus clouds.

== Preparations ==
=== Caroline Islands ===
As Bopha was organizing, the National Weather Service (NWS) in Guam issued a tropical storm watch for the FSM islands of Nukuoro and Lukunor. The watch was upgraded to a tropical storm warning on November 26, and the watch was expanded to include Losap and Chuuk Lagoon. As Bopha moved westward, the office also issued a tropical storm watch for Poluwat, and Satawal, both of which were upgraded to warnings, and a typhoon watch was issued for Woleai.

The Palau National Emergency Management Office (NEMO) issued an announcement on November 29 requesting the public to stock up with emergency supplies such as food and water for three days, portable radios with spare batteries, flashlights, and first-aid kits. The citizens of Palau were also advised to secure loose objects that might be lifted up by the strong winds, board up windows, trim tree branches that could fall and damage homes, fill up vehicles with gas, secure boats and assist their communities in preparing.

=== Philippines ===
==== Highest Tropical Cyclone Wind Signal ====
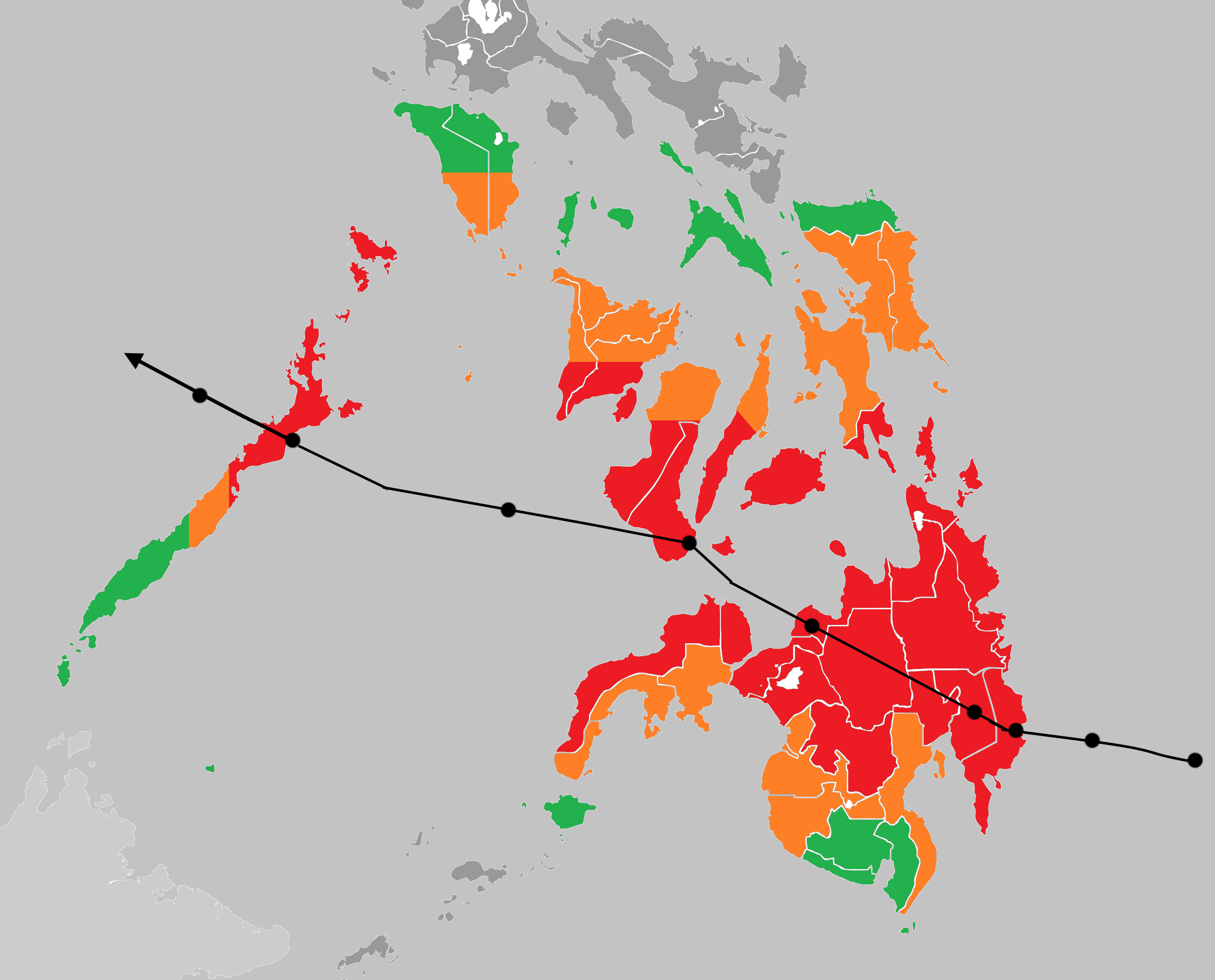
PSWS map and path during the passage of Super Typhoon Bopha (Pablo) in Mindanao and Southern Visayas

TCWS#	Luzon	Visayas	Mindanao
3	Northern Portion of Palawan	Guimaras, Southern Portion of Antique, Southern Portion of Iloilo, Northern and Central Portions of Negros Occidental, Negros Oriental, Siquijor, Bohol, Southern Portion of Cebu, Southern Leyte	Dinagat Provinces, Surigao del Norte, Surigao del Sur, Agusan del Norte, Agusan del Sur, Bukidnon, Camiguin, Lanao del Norte, Lanao del Sur, Compostela Valley, Davao del Norte, Davao Oriental, Misamis Occidental, Misamis Oriental, North Cotabato, Zamboanga del Norte
2	Central Portion of Palawan, Cuyo Islands, Ilocos Norte, Ilocos Sur, La Union, Southern Portion of Occidental Mindoro, Southern Portion of Oriental Mindoro	Aklan, Capiz, Caluya Islands, Rest of Antique, Rest of Iloilo, Rest of Negros Occidental, Bantayan Islands, Rest of Cebu, Biliran, Leyte, Eastern Samar, Samar	Davao del Sur, Maguindanao, Sultan Kudarat, Zamboanga del Sur, Zamboanga Sibugay
1	Pangasinan, Babuyan Islands, Batanes, Cagayan, Abra, Apayao, Benguet, Kalinga, Mountain Province, Zambales, Romblon, Rest of Occidental Mindoro, Rest of Oriental Mindoro, Rest of Palawan, Burias Island, Masbate, Ticao Island	Northern Samar	Basilan, Samal Island, Sarangani, South Cotabato

Initially, the National Disaster Risk Reduction and Management Council (NDRRMC) advised the citizens of Iligan and Cagayan de Oro to prepare for the impact of the storm, as they really did not want a repeat of Severe Tropical Storm Washi, which had hit when people were asleep and, therefore, had caused a large number of deaths. On December 2, the NDRRMC put parts of the central and southeastern Philippines on high alert. Relief food and medicines had been pre-positioned while thousands of people along the country's eastern border were being prepared for evacuation to safer ground in preparation for the typhoon. With Bopha expected to strike Mindanao and Visayas, as well as areas in Southern Tagalog and Metro Manila, the possibility of landslides was advised in Surigao, Davao, Compostela Valley, Misamis, Bukidnon, Lanao del Norte, Lanao del Sur, Zamboanga, Leyte, Cebu, Bohol, Negros, Panay and Mindoro. "Keep updated on the bulletins from PAGASA. Always cooperate with the local authorities as the National Government is all ready to provide all assistance to those that may be affected," Valte said. Also, disaster authorities in Bicol were alerted and getting ready with their disaster contingency plan as the typhoon was closing in.On December 3, around 2,000 families living in Hinatuan, on the province of Surigao del Sur, were evacuated. Since schools would be turned into evacuation centers, Candelario Viola, the mayor of Hinatuan, ordered the suspension of all classes in the town. Mar Roxas, the Interior and Local Government Secretary, said that National Disaster Risk Reduction and Management Council’s disaster monitoring systems were set up in several regions across the Philippines. "In accordance with President Aquino’s marching orders to ensure zero casualties from disasters, as much as possible, I have ordered our regional directors to make sure that the necessary precautions are undertaken to mitigate the effects of Tropical Storm Bopha," he said. "We have our existing protocols, and it is just a matter of implementing them and making other necessary preparations as appropriate." Roxas added. As preparations continued, Storm signal number 1 was declared over Siquijor, Bohol, Biliran, Camotes Island, Cebu Southern Leyte, Leyte, Eastern Samar, Western Samar, Surigao del Norte, Siargao Island, Dinagat Island, Agusan del Norte, Agusan del Sur, rest of Davao Oriental, Davaol del Norte including Samal Island, Compostela Valley, Bukidnon, Misamis Occidental, Misamis oriental, Camiguin, Lanao del Norte and Lanao del Sur. Also, signal number 2 was raised over Surigao del Sur and the northern part of Davao Oriental. The national police, coast guard (PCG) and navy had placed their personnel on standby and their disaster-response units in preparation for Bopha's impact. "We are ready to conduct rescue operations in flooded areas. Let us warn operators of small vessels, motor bancas, and fishing boats to avoid sailing in the southeastern and eastern section of the country where the sea is rough," said PCG spokesman Commander Armand Balilo. After staying in the South China Sea for at least 4 days, "Pablo" again threatened the western sections of Northern Luzon, and by the afternoon of December 8, public storm warning signal number 2 was raised over 3 provinces, and 11 provinces were inside signal number 1. Forecasters said the storm had turned and is due to hit the Philippines on December 9.

== Impact ==
=== Caroline Islands ===
As Typhoon Bopha passed to the south of the island, power outages occurred across the island chain. Communication network disruptions delayed updates on damage assessments after the storm passed. Initial damage assessments in Koror indicated slight damage, with uprooted trees and power disruption. Outside of Koror, coastal villages were affected by strong winds and rain, which flooded outlying areas. Heavy rains flooded areas of Peleliu, and houses in Babeldaob were destroyed.

=== Philippines ===
==== December 4 ====
Animated enhanced infrared satellite loop of Typhoon Bopha from peak intensity to landfall in the Philippines

Costliest Philippine typhoons
Rank	Storm	Season	Damage		Ref.
Rank	Storm	Season	PHP	USD	Ref.
1	Yolanda (Haiyan)	2013	₱95.5 billion	$2.98 billion	
2	Odette (Rai)	2021	₱51.7 billion	$968 million	
3	Glenda (Rammasun)	2014	₱38.6 billion	$771 million	
4	Pablo (Bopha)	2012	₱36.9 billion	$724 million	
5	Ompong (Mangkhut)	2018	₱33.9 billion	$627 million	
6	Pepeng (Parma)	2009	₱27.3 billion	$591 million	
7	Ulysses (Vamco)	2020	₱20.2 billion	$420 million	
8	Crising (Wipha)	2025	₱18.4 billion	$373 million	
9	Kristine (Trami)	2024	₱18.4 billion	$373 million	
10	Rolly (Goni)	2020	₱17.9 billion	$371 million	

Typhoon Bopha made landfall over Mindanao on December 4, destroying homes, cutting power and forcing the cancellation of flights and ferry services. There was only one confirmed death at that moment, but local media said people were injured by flying debris and falling trees. Typhoon Bopha packed winds of up to 175 mph when it struck the island nation, bringing torrential rains that flattened entire villages, leaving thousands homeless, as well as washing out roads and bridges needed by rescue personnel trying to reach stricken regions. The death toll from Bopha rose to 82 as rescuers attempted to reach areas cut off in flash floods and mudslides. There were 49 fatalities in a mudslide in the mountainous town of New Bataan alone, and another 33 died in rural settlements elsewhere in Mindanao. Joe Curry, the Philippines head of Catholic Relief Services, said, "Authorities seem more prepared to deal with this storm. So far there's been more preparedness efforts at this time, but I think we're going to see the damage [reports] come out later today and tomorrow." Flood waters “rampaged down a mountain, engulfing emergency shelters and washing away an army truck” the Associated Press (AP) reported. The typhoon had affected more than 213,000 people, demolished houses and stranded people in two provinces and parts of the Visayas region, according to a disaster agency. More than 179,000 people were in evacuation centers. School classes were suspended in many cities, and dozens of flights were cancelled, according to the national disaster agency. Nearly 5,000 travellers had been left stranded at ports across the country as of December 5 because of disruption to ferry services.

==== December 5 ====
Lieutenant Colonel Lyndon Paniza of the army’s 10th Infantry Division, said fatalities from Compostela Valley had gone up to 142, 69 of whom were from a flash flood the previous day in New Bataan. "Electrical poles snapped like matchsticks as Bopha's devastating winds howled across Mindanao, leaving large swaths of territory without power. It was the strongest weather disturbance to hit the south in two decades," the government said. Defense undersecretary Benito Ramos, who heads the national disaster and relief council, didn't give any financial estimate of the damage to agriculture and infrastructure caused by Bopha, saying estimates were still being collected. Arthur Uy, governor of the worst-hit province, Compostela Valley in Mindanao, said raging water and mud from the mountains had swept through school buildings, covered courts, town halls, and health centers where residents had taken shelter. The death toll in the province stood at 150. "The waters came so suddenly and unexpectedly, and the winds were so fierce; that compounded the loss of lives and livelihood," Uy told Reuters in a telephone interview. He said farm water catchment basins atop mountains had given way due to the torrential rains, sending down heavy volumes of water to the flatlands below. Damage to agriculture and infrastructure in Compostela Valley province could reach at least 4 billion pesos, equivalent to €75 million or $98 million U.S., with the typhoon destroying 70–80% of plantations, mostly bananas for export, Uy said. By the evening of December 5, 280 fatalities had been reported on the islands with hundreds missing, while rescuers were attempting to reach areas cut off by floods and mudslides.

Deadliest Philippine typhoons
Rank	Storm	Season	Fatalities	Ref.
1	Yolanda (Haiyan)	2013	6,300	
2	Uring (Thelma)	1991	5,101–8,000	
3	Pablo (Bopha)	2012	1,901	
4	"Angela"	1867	1,800	
5	Winnie	2004	1,593	
6	"October 1897"	1897	1,500	
7	Nitang (Ike)	1984	1,426	
8	Reming (Durian)	2006	1,399	
9	Frank (Fengshen)	2008	1,371	(Note: The death and missing columns includes deaths caused by Typhoon Fengshen (Frank), in the MV Princess of the Stars disaster.)
10	Sendong (Washi)	2011	1,292–2,546	

==== December 6 ====
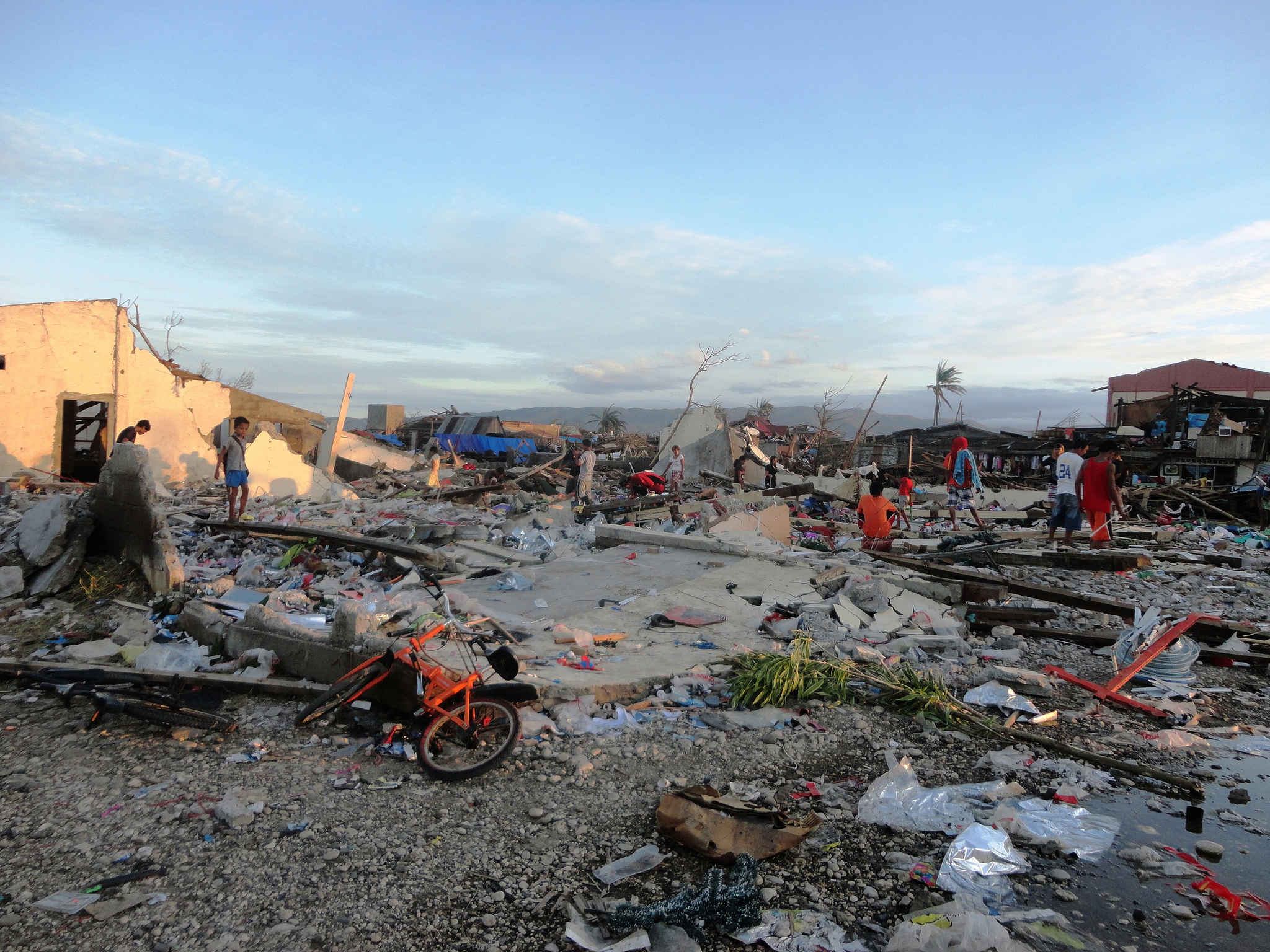
Homes destroyed by the storm in Cateel, Davao Oriental

The civil defense office said that at least 326 people had been confirmed dead and another 379 remained missing. In Compostela Valley province alone, at least 184 people died, many when flash floods had hit emergency shelters where they had taken refuge. Social Welfare Secretary Corazon Soliman said the government had sought help from the Swiss-based International Organization for Migration to build temporary shelters for Bopha survivors. President Benigno Aquino III sent navy ships with food and other supplies to 150,000 people on Mindanao's east coast, where three towns remained cut off by landslides and wrecked bridges. Officials said many of the Mindanao victims were poor migrants who had flocked by the thousands to mountainous, landslide-prone sites like the towns of New Bataan and Monkayo to work at unregulated small-scale gold mines. The International Federation of Red Cross and Red Crescent Societies issued an urgent appeal for $4.8 million to help people directly affected by the typhoon. "We had a problem of where to take the evacuees. All the evacuation centers have lost their roofs," Davao Oriental Gov. Corazon Nunez-Malanyaon said. Later that day, 475 were confirmed dead, and the government appealed for international help.

==== December 7 ====
Due to the typhoon damage, Proclamation No. 522 signed by President Benigno Aquino III placed the Philippines under state of national calamity.

==== December 8 ====
Nearly 600 fatalities have been confirmed, and hundreds are still missing as the storm has made a U-turn and threatens the country's northwest.

==== December 9 ====
548 people are confirmed dead, and 827 are missing.

==== December 10 ====
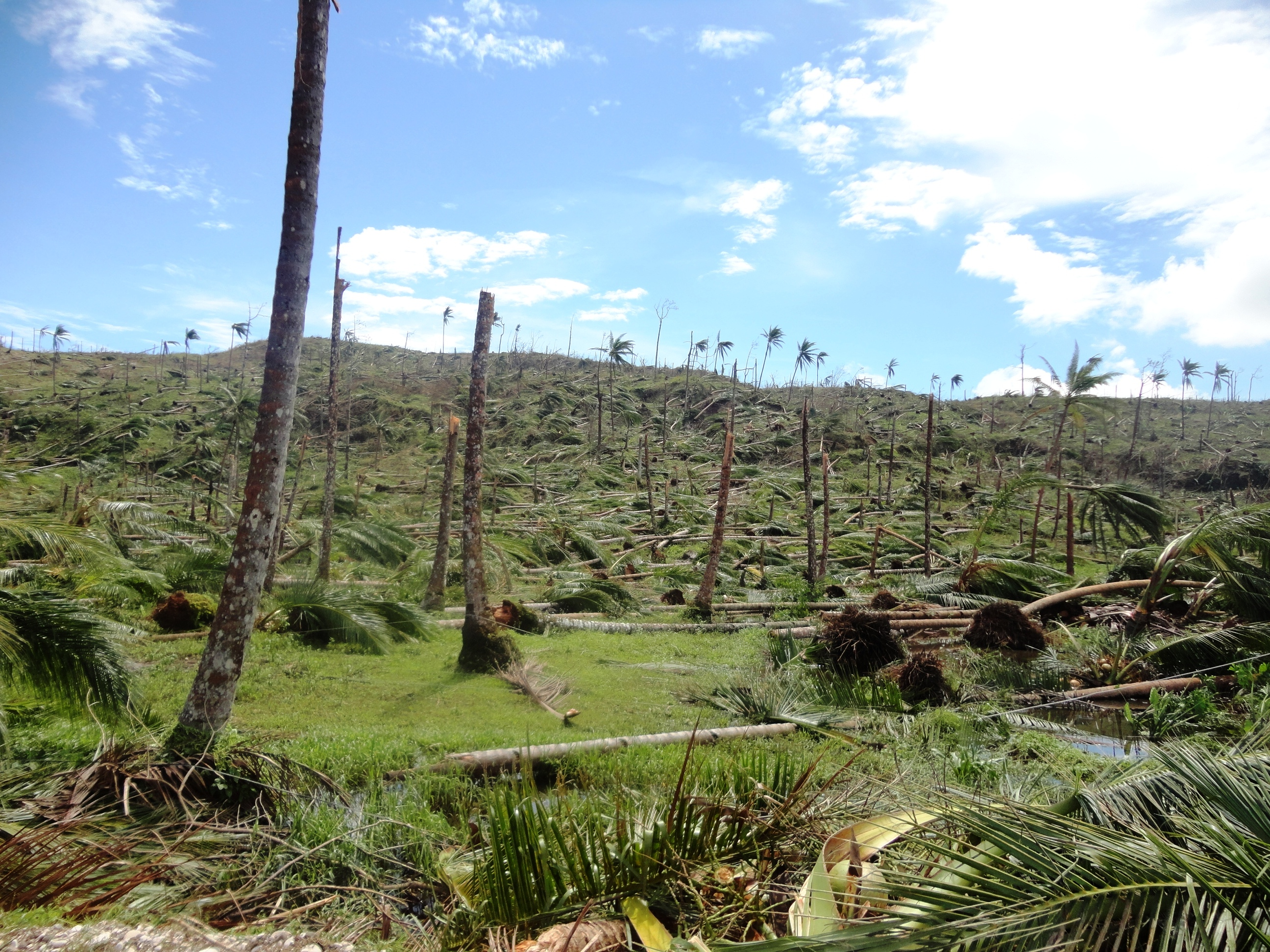
Destructive winds produced by the storm caused widespread deforestation

Philippines disaster chief says 647 deaths have been confirmed and is likely to rise. 780 people are still missing, including hundreds of fishermen. The storm has caused crop damage worth 8.5 billion pesos ($210 million).

==== December 13 ====
The National Disaster Risk Reduction and Management Council placed the death toll from the typhoon at 902 and could reach a thousand as 635 remain missing. Of the dead, 567 have been identified. The NDRRMC said most of the reported deaths were in the badly hit provinces of Davao Oriental and Compostela Valley.

The NDRRMC said that 296 of the more than 300 missing tuna fishermen from General Santos have been rescued by Task Force Maritime Search and Rescue SarGen and to date, only 14 persons remain missing in General Santos. At least 80,000 people were left homeless.

==== December 15 ====
The death toll reached 1,067 people, with most in Mindanao, where floods and landslides caused major damage on December 4. A total of 834 people remain missing, about half of them are fishermen.

== Aftermath ==
=== International aid and assistance ===
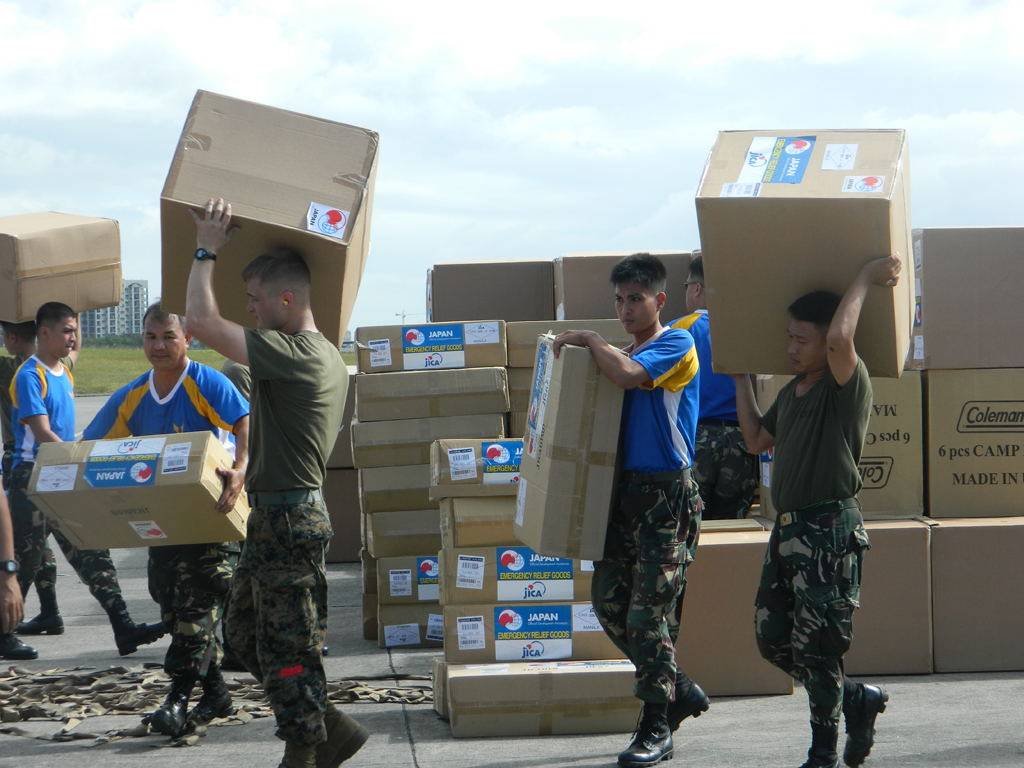
The United States Marines and Philippine service members prepare humanitarian relief supplies at the Villamor Airbase in Manila to be flown to Francisco Bangoy International Airport for distribution to residents affected by the typhoon

- European Union: The European Commission provided Euro 10 million (₱543 million) for the victims of Typhoon Bopha, notably in the regions of Compostella Valley and Davao Oriental in Mindanao.
- Australia: The Australian government provided A$7.3 million (₱307 million) for the victims of Typhoon Bopha which mostly affected Visayas and Mindanao earlier this month.
- China: The Chinese government presented over US$200,000 in aid to the Department of Foreign Affairs of the Philippines. The Red Cross Society of China also donated US$30,000 to the Philippine Red Cross.
- Indonesia: The Indonesian government gave US$1 million, 4 tons of relief goods and 2,000 tons of rice to help the typhoon victims, coursing the assistance through the Armed Forces of the Philippines.
- Japan: The Japanese government announced that it provided an additional $4.2 million emergency grant aid to the Philippines for the victims of Typhoon Pablo (Bopha).
- Laos: Laos extended US$30,000 in aid to the victims of the typhoon
- Myanmar: The Myanmar government donated US$50,000 in rehabilitation aid to the Philippines.
- Sri Lanka: Sri Lanka gave US$25,000 in aid to the Philippines for the rebuilding of homes destroyed by the typhoon.
- Timor-Leste: The Timor-Leste government extended US$750,000 in assistance to the victims of Typhoon Bopha.

== Retirement ==
Due to its high death toll and damage, the Philippine Atmospheric, Geophysical and Astronomical Services Administration (PAGASA) announced that the name Pablo was decommissioned and will no longer be used for tropical cyclones. In February 2013, PAGASA selected the name Pepito to replace Pablo for the 2016 season.

In February 2013, the ESCAP/WMO Typhoon Committee announced that Bopha will also be retired from its naming lists and was replaced with the name Ampil. The name Ampil was first used in the 2018 season.

== See also ==
- List of Equatorial tropical cyclones
- Typhoon Kate (1970)
- Typhoon Tembin (2017)
- Typhoon Ike
- Tropical Storm Washi
- Typhoon Haiyan
- Typhoon Louise – another powerful typhoon that struck Mindanao as a Category 5.
- Typhoon Rai – a powerful typhoon that impacted similar areas as Bopha in 2021
- Tropical Storm Nalgae – a tropical storm that caused deadly flooding in that area even though the storm didn't make landfall in Mindanao.
