= Kutu (island) =

Island in Chuuk State, Federal States of Micronesia

Coordinates: 5.4544°N 153.4588°E

Kuttu
- Municipality
- Flag
- Interactive map of Kuttu
- Country: Federated States of Micronesia
- State: Chuuk State

Kutu is an island and municipality in Nomoi Islands district of the state of Chuuk, Federated States of Micronesia. It is part of the Caroline Islands group and on the western side of the Satawan atoll.
