= Nama (island) =

Island in Chuuk, Federated States of Micronesia

Coordinates: 6.9918°N 152.5746°E

Location of Nama Island in the Pacific Ocean

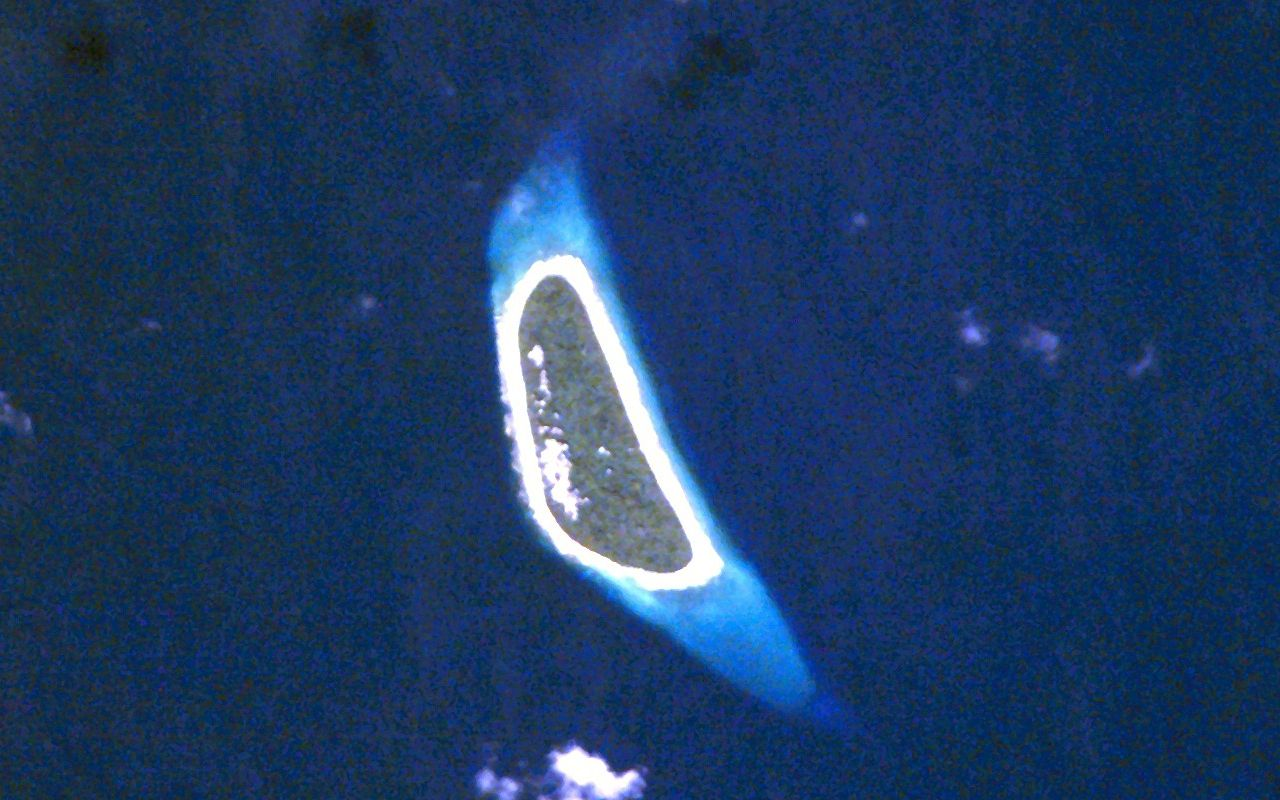
NASA picture of Nama Island

Nama or Nema is an island and municipality in the state of Chuuk, Federated States of Micronesia.

It is a 1.5 km long and 0.5 km wide island part of the Eastern Islands or Upper Mortlock Islands group, located about 60 km to the ESE of Chuuk and 13 km NW of Losap. Nama is densely populated despite its small size. It had 995 inhabitants in the 2000 census.

== Climate ==
Nama has a hot semi-arid climate (Köppen climate classification: BSh) that borders on a tropical savanna climate (Aw).

Climate data for Nama
Month	Jan	Feb	Mar	Apr	May	Jun	Jul	Aug	Sep	Oct	Nov	Dec	Year
Mean daily maximum °C (°F)	32 (90)	34 (93)	36 (97)	37 (99)	38 (100)	39 (102)	40 (104)	39 (102)	38 (100)	36 (97)	35 (95)	33 (91)	36.42 (97.56)
Daily mean °C (°F)	29 (84)	30 (86)	34 (93)	34 (93)	35 (95)	38 (100)	38 (100)	37 (99)	36 (97)	33 (91)	32 (90)	29 (84)	33.75 (92.75)
Mean daily minimum °C (°F)	26 (79)	28 (82)	31 (88)	32 (90)	34 (93)	36 (97)	36 (97)	35 (95)	33 (91)	30 (86)	29 (84)	27 (81)	31.42 (88.56)
Average rainfall mm (inches)	0 (0)	0.12 (0.00)	1 (0.0)	0.65 (0.03)	55 (2.2)	218 (8.6)	320 (12.6)	165 (6.5)	25 (1.0)	2 (0.1)	0.33 (0.01)	0.15 (0.01)	787.25 (30.99)
Source: Micronesian National Institute of Meteorology
