= Young William (1794 Whitby ship) =

British merchant and slave ship 1794–1802

History

Great Britain
- Name: Young William
- Launched: 1794, Whitby
- Fate: Wrecked September 1802

General characteristics
- Tons burthen: 460 (bm)
- Propulsion: Sails
- Sail plan: Full-rigged ship
- Armament: 1797:10 × 6-pounder guns; 1799:20 × 9-pounder guns

Young William was a ship launched in 1794 at Whitby, Yorkshire, England. She made a voyage to Botany Bay for the British East India Company (EIC), and then on her way to China discovered or rediscovered several Pacific Islands. Later, she made two voyages as a slave ship in the triangular trade in enslaved people. She was wrecked in September 1802, as she was returning from Jamaica after having delivered her captives.

== Career ==
=== EIC voyage ===
On 11 September 1794 Young William, with James Mortlock, master, started taking on stores at Deptford on the account of the Government of New South Wales. She then waited at Portsmouth and Plymouth for a convoy to Australia.

Captain Mortlock sailed from Portsmouth on 25 May 1795, bound for China via Port Jackson. Young William reached Rio de Janeiro on 11 July. There she revictualed and stayed until 22 July. On 19 August she passed the Cape of Good Hope. She finally arrived at Port Jackson on 4 October. She unloaded her stores and then on 29 October left for China.

Mortlock sailed for China via New Guinea. On 14 November a flotilla of war canoe approached Young William, clearly intending to board. Mortlock fired a warning shot from one of his cannon, which sufficed to deter them.

On his way, Mortlock rediscovered two sets of islands. At noon on 20 November Mortlock gave his position as 4°56′S 157°5′E. This is about 10 miles from the Takuu Atoll, a Polynesian outlier atoll northeast of Bougainville, Papua New Guinea. (Note: Both the Google and Bing maps show the atoll as an island, with the Google map showing the "island" twice. In both cases the satellite/aerial photograph clearly shows the atoll.) On 28 November Mortlock identified another atoll, this one at 5°17′N 153°28′E. This is Satawan, which is part of the Nomoi or Mortlock Islands in the Carolines and administratively part of Chuuk State in the Federated States of Micronesia. Both sets are in the Federated States of Micronesia: the Nomoi Islands and the Upper Mortlock Islands.

Young William reached Macao on 13 December, and then arrived at Whampoa Anchorage on 22 December. Homeward bound, she crossed the Second Bar on 9 February 1796, reached St Helena on 6 May, and arrived at The Downs on 3 August. On 2 August the British Royal Navy intercepted her at St. Catherine's Point and pressed most of her crew.

=== Transport ===
Young William entered Lloyd's Register (LR) in 1797 with W. Walker, master, W. Leighton, owner and trade London transport. That entry continued unchanged in 1798.

=== Transporting enslaved people ===
In 1799, the entry continued, but indicated a change of master to J. Carshaw, a change of owner to Tobin, an increase in armament, and a change in trade to Liverpool-Africa.

1st voyage transporting enslaved people (1799–1800): On 1 July 1799, Young William, Joseph Carshore (or Carshaw), master, sailed from Liverpool to the Bight of Biafra and Gulf of Guinea islands. In 1799, 156 vessels sailed from English ports to acquire and transport enslaved people; 134 sailed from Liverpool.

Young William embarked captives at Bonny and carried them to Montego Bay, Jamaica. Young William arrived at Jamaica on 22 April 1800, with 589 captives. She arrived at London on 24 December. At some point in the voyage her master had changed to John Smith. She had left Liverpool with a crew of 50 men; 11 men died during the voyage.

2nd voyage transporting enslaved people (1801): In 1801, her master changed first to Robert Bennett and then to W. Williams. She underwent repairs in 1801.

Robert Bennett, master, sailed Young William from Liverpool on 31 November 1801, to the Bight of Biafra and Gulf of Guinea islands. In 1801, 147 vessels sailed from English ports to acquire and transport enslaved people; 122 sailed from Liverpool.

She left Africa on 5 May 1802, and arrived at Kingston, Jamaica, on 21 June, with 346 captives. At some point James Pierce Carroll replaced Bennett as master. She left Jamaica on 28 July 1802.

== Fate ==
One report from late September 1802, stated that Young William, Carrol, master, from Jamaica to Liverpool, was on shore at Holyhead. The expectation was that part of the cargo would be saved. Another report had her running aground at Crigyll, Anglesey, and being wrecked. Her crew were rescued. Of her crew of 43, 13 had died on the voyage. (Note: Hackman conflates this Young William with another Young William. It was this second vessel that a French frigate captured in 1810.)

In 1802, 12 British vessels in the triangular trade were lost. The source for this number states that none were lost on the homeward bound leg. However, unless Lloyd's List identified a vessel as a Guineaman, the source would not have registered the loss. Still, during the period 1793 to 1807, war, rather than maritime hazards or resistance by the captives, was the greatest cause of vessel losses among British enslaving vessels.
