= Nomoi Islands =

Group of three atolls in Chuuk state, Micronesia

Coordinates: 5°29′30″N 153°37′30″E

Location of the Nomoi Islands in the Pacific Ocean

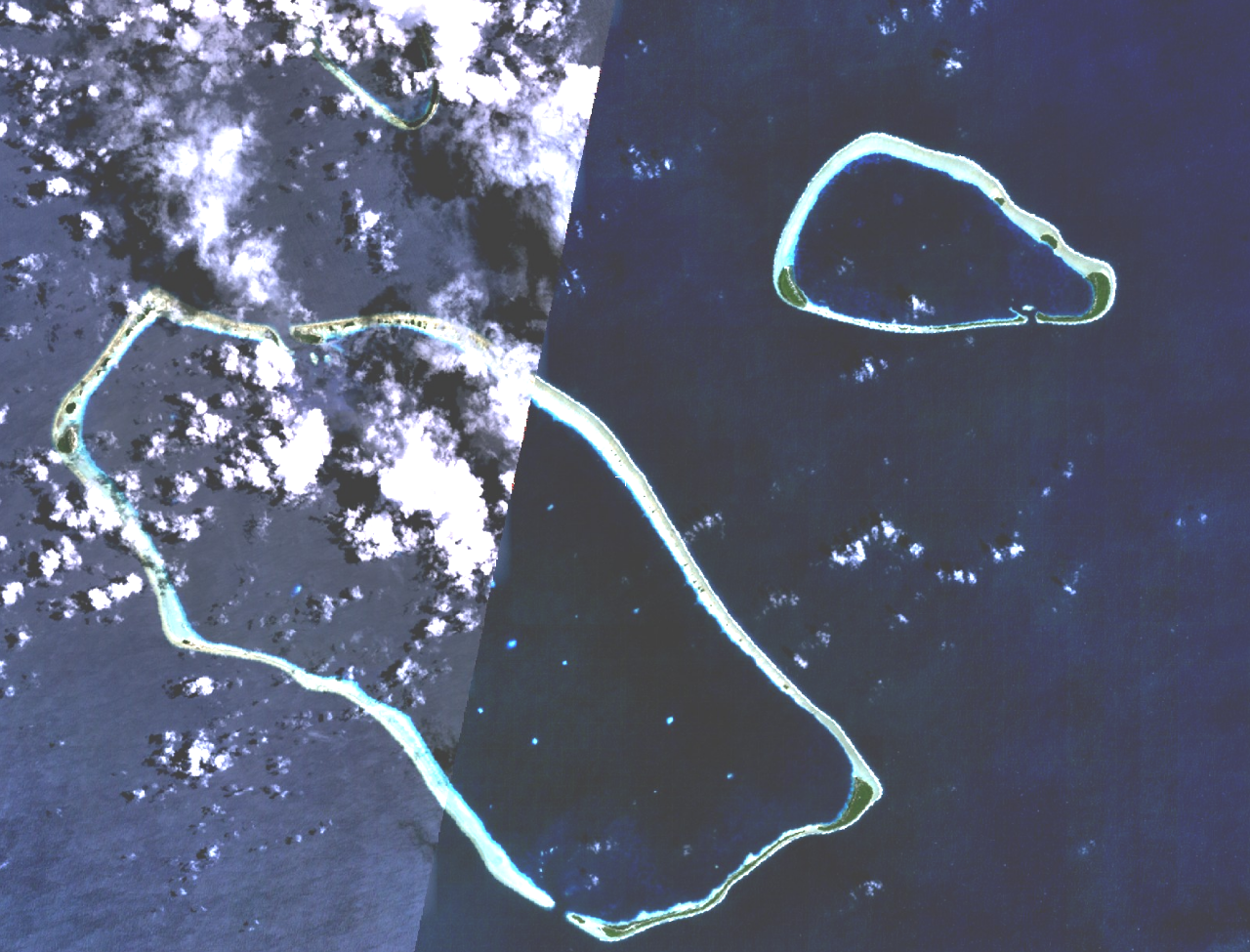
NASA picture of the Nomoi Islands with larger Satawan Atoll and Lukunor fully displayed; Etal Atoll is only partly seen

The Nomoi Islands, also known as the Mortlock Islands, are a group of three atolls in the state of Chuuk, Federated States of Micronesia. They are located approximately 250 kilometers (160 miles) southeast of Chuuk Lagoon.

== Islands ==
The Mortlock Islands are made up of the islands Ettal, Namoluk, Ta, Nama, Oneop, Losap, Moch, Picemwar, Satawan, Lukunor (Likinioch), and Kuttu (KuKuttu). Losap, Nama, and Namoluk are clustered to the northwest of the other islands, and are also called the Upper Mortlock Islands or Eastern Islands.

Satawan, the southern atoll, is the largest. Both Etal, to the north, and Lukunor to the northeast are significantly smaller. They are located between 6 and 9 kilometers (3.7 and 5.6 miles) of each other.

== History ==
The Namoi Islands have thought to have been initially settled eight to nine hundred years ago by natives moving eastward from the Chuuk Lagoon.

During the Age of Exploration the islands were sighted by the Spanish expedition of Álvaro de Saavedra in 1528. Centuries later, Captain James Mortlock rediscovered two sets of islands when he was sailing from Port Jackson to Whampoa in Young William on the 19th and 27 November 1795. Confusingly, both were later called the Mortlock Islands.

Unfortunately, due to the reliance of oral story telling to pass down history, coupled with natural disasters, war, and other factors, much of the originating people's history is lost. What is known is mostly from writings of missionaries and various ancient artifacts.

== Ethnography ==
The Mortlock Islands remain more traditional than the inner lagoon islands. The Mortlockese language is similar to that of surrounding languages, such as Satawalese, and Puluwatese, with the language of Chuukese being especially close, albeit spoken and pronounced distinctly.

== See also ==
- Takuu Atoll
