= Oneop =

Island in Chuuk State, Federal States of Micronesia

Coordinates: 5.5077°N 153.7101°E

Oneop is an island in the Mortlock Islands, and municipality in the state of Chuuk, Federated States of Micronesia. It belongs to the Caroline Islands group.
