= Ta (island) =

Island in Chuuk State, Federal States of Micronesia

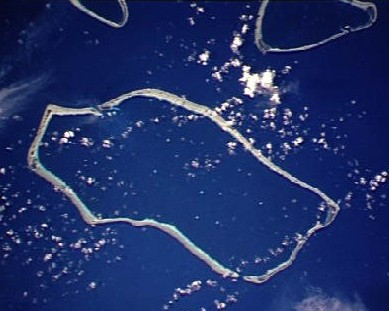

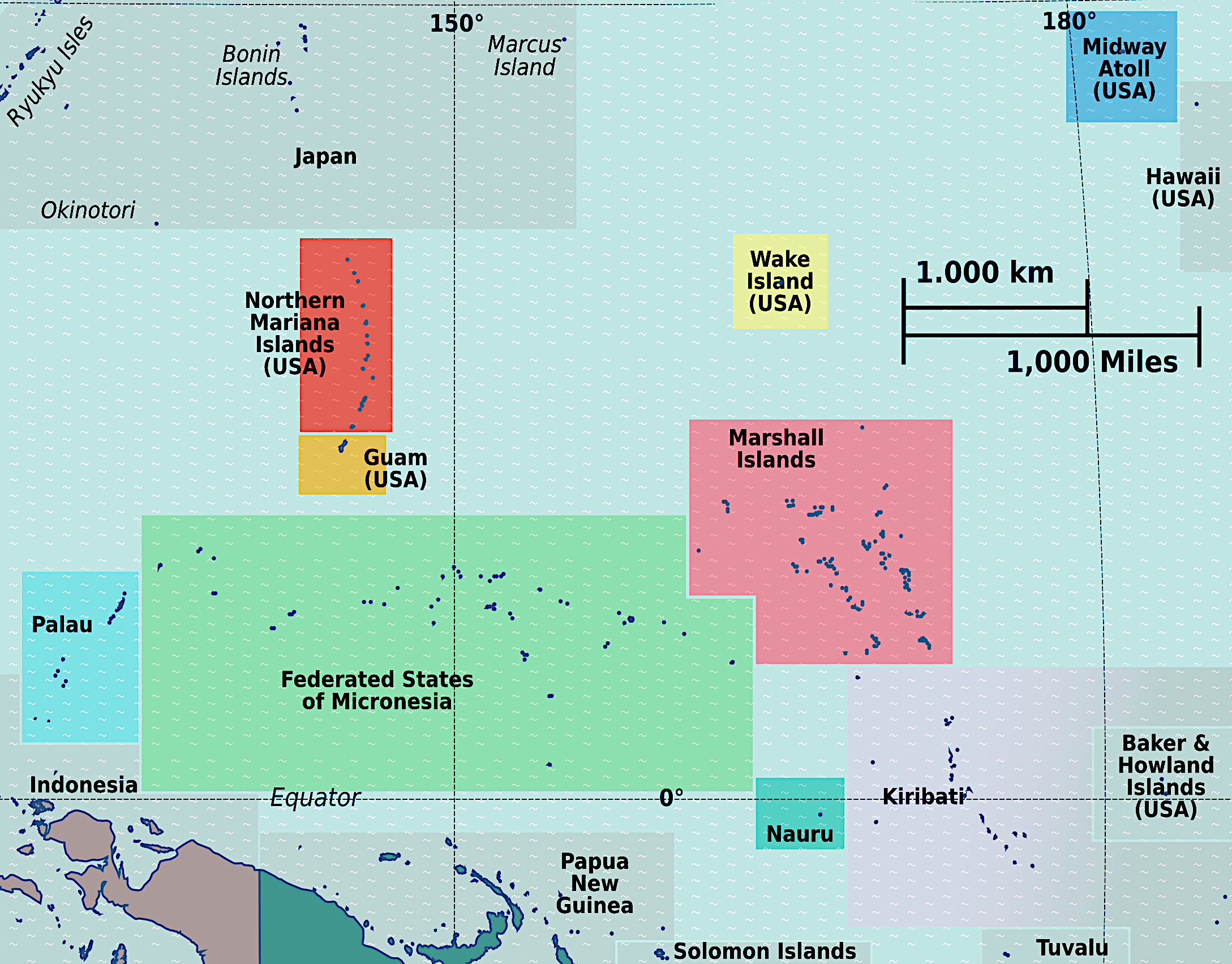

Geography
- Location: Caroline Islands
- Coordinates: 5.2878°N 153.6616°E

Ta is an island and municipality in the Nomoi Islands district of the state of Chuuk, Federated States of Micronesia. It is at the southern end of the Satawan atoll.
