= Satawan =

Pacific atoll in Chuuk State, Federated States of Micronesia

Location of Satawan Atoll in the Pacific Ocean

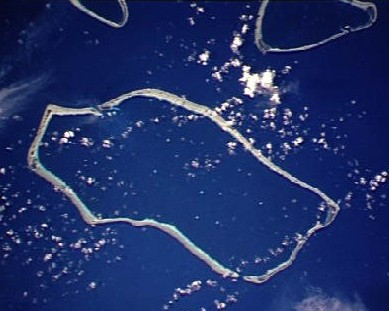
NASA picture of Satawan Atoll

Satawan Atoll is an atoll located about 250 kilometers (160 mi) southeast of Chuuk Lagoon proper. Geographically it is part of the Nomoi or Mortlock Islands in the Carolines and administratively it is part of Chuuk State in the Federated States of Micronesia. About 3,000 people live on a land area of 5 square kilometers (1.9 sq mi).

A Japanese airfield was located on the atoll during World War II.

== Name ==
The name of the island goes back to Proto-Chuukic *tadawana, making it etymologically related to Satawal.

== Administrative divisions ==
Satawan Atoll administratively consists of four of the 40 municipalities of Chuuk State, named after the principal islets:

- Satowan (Satawan) (east)
- Ta (south)
- Kuttu (Kutu) (west)
- Moch (More) (north)

Satowan and Ta municipalities are statistically grouped with the "Lower Mortlocks", and Kuttu and Moch municipalities with the "Mid Mortlocks".

Satawan Atoll had a population of 2,935 as of the 2000 census. Satawan Atoll is located at 5.30°N 153.70°E and has a total area of 419 square kilometers (162 sq mi) (including the lagoon), but a land area of only 4.6 square kilometers (1.8 sq mi).

== History ==
Captain James Mortlock was sailing from Port Jackson to Whampoa in Young William when he rediscovered two sets of islands on 19 and 27 November 1795. Confusingly, both were later called Mortlock Islands.

During World War II the Japanese garrison on the Mortlock Islands, under the command of Colonel Masatake Tobita, consisted of 753 IJA men including a company of six medium tanks and 257 IJN men including air base crew. Some World War II relics left by the Japanese can be found on Satawan. These include tanks (which may be seen on the main road), a few small planes, (the island was at one point home to a Japanese airstrip), and stone look-out posts along the north east coast. One can walk from Satawan to Ta via the reef at low tide. Near the end that is towards the island called Ta is a large cannon left over from the Japanese that points out into the ocean.

== Description ==
There are an elementary school and a high school that serve the islanders. There is no regular electricity, running water. Solar electricity is available at the local high school, Mortlock High School. Satowan now also has a satellite internet connection available. Until May 2010, the only transportation to this island was a fishing boat carrying freight called the Nomasepi. About once a month it did a six-day circuit around the Mortlocks from Weno, but for now has been stopped. The cost of the six-day round trip was 40 dollars. Now there are a few more travel options to and from Satowan. The Micronesian Navigator and Carolina Voyager are large cargo/passenger ships that sail to and from Pohnpei and Weno, Chuuk, stopping along the Mortlock Islands as well. The fee for regular passengers is $12 one way from Satowan to Weno. There are smaller, local cargo ships named Queen and Midas Neuvich that sail to Satowan much more regularly. Midas is the most regular, usually stopping by Satowan every two weeks or so. As far as air travel, one could fly to the neighboring island of Ta from Weno, Chuuk or Pohnpei. Caroline Islands Air is the only airline service in the area. The airline lands at Mortlock Islands Airfield on a 1,350 feet (410 m) concrete runway next to Ta Village along the south side of Satawan. Upon arrival one would have to ride a motorboat for about twenty minutes to reach Satowan. Currently, flights from Weno to Ta cost $190 while flights from Pohnpei to Ta cost $240. Additionally, about three gallons of fuel is needed to reach Satowan from Ta. Or one could simply walk to Satowan from Ta during low tide, which takes anywhere from 1.5 to 3 hours. Each island has its own local constitution which currently allows for a Mayor and Deputy Mayor. The only taxes are a 5 dollar fee per year for owning a dog. According to local estimates as of May 2010, the population is between 400 and 700.
