= Lukunor =

Island in the Federated States of Micronesia

Coordinates: 5.5024°N 153.817°E

Location of Lukunor Atoll in the Pacific Ocean

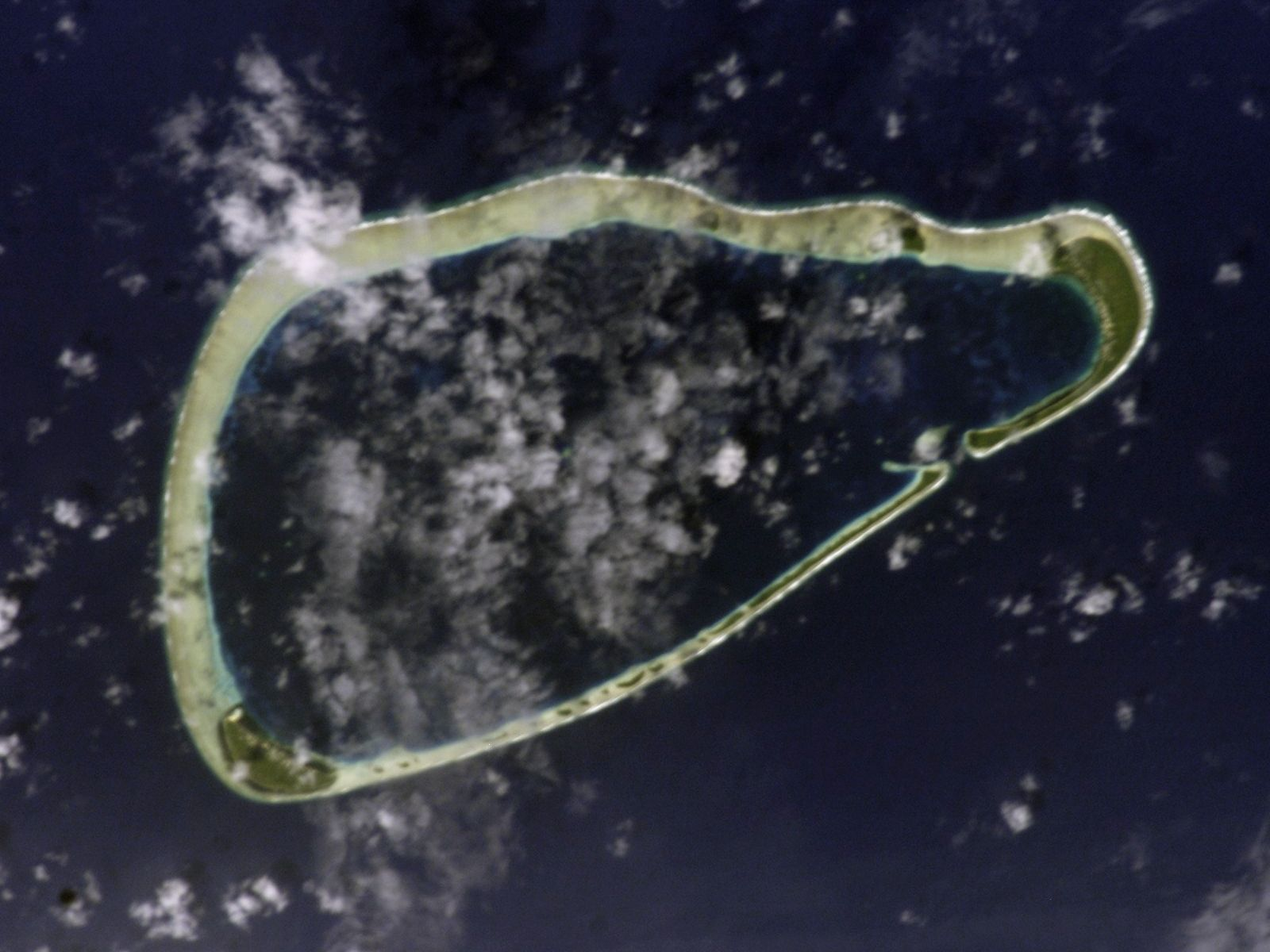
NASA picture of Lukunor Atoll

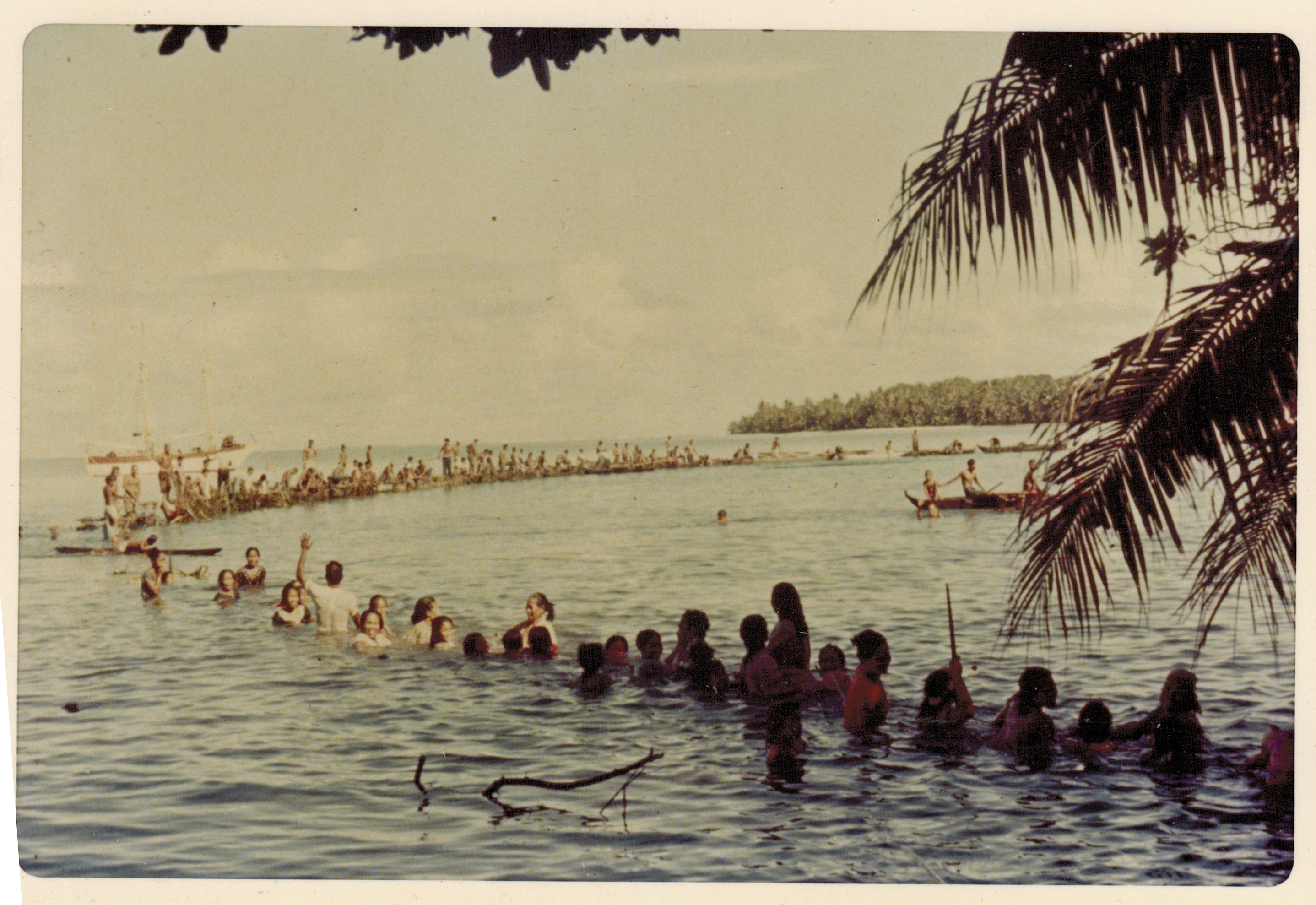
Lukunor population capturing large schools of a migratory fish, tiil, in 1947.

Lukunor is an Island and municipality in the state of Chuuk, Federated States of Micronesia.

It is a small atoll part of the Nomoi Islands group, located about 264 km to the southeast of Chuuk.

== History ==
Lukunor was first sighted by Europeans by the Spanish expedition of Álvaro de Saavedra shortly after August 1528 in its first attempt to return to New Spain.

== Climate ==
Lukunoch, Chuuk, Federated States of Micronesia

Climate chart (precipitation, max. and min. temperature)
J	F	M	A	M	J	J	A	S	O	N	D
9.2 88 75	9.8 88 75	11 89 75	12 89 75	13 89 75	12 89 75	16 89 75	14 89 75	10 89 75	11 89 75	10 89 75	11 89 75
- █ Average max. and min. temperatures in °F
- █ Precipitation totals in inches
- Source: 1981-2010 provisional normals
Metric conversion
J	F	M	A	M	J	J	A	S	O	N	D
234 31 24	249 31 24	271 31 24	301 31 24	325 31 24	304 32 24	418 32 24	360 31 24	264 32 24	286 32 24	260 32 24	285 31 24
- █ Average max. and min. temperatures in °C
- █ Precipitation totals in mm
