= Moch, Federated States of Micronesia =

Island and municipality in Chuuk State

Coordinates: 7.4930°N 151.5391°E

Moch
- Municipality
- Flag
- Interactive map of Moch
- Country: Federated States of Micronesia
- State: Chuuk State

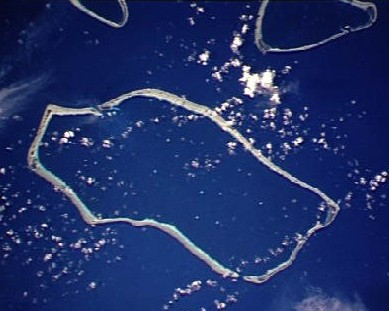
Moch

Moch is an islet of the Satawan Atoll and a municipality in the state of Chuuk, Federated States of Micronesia. The island covers an area approximately 0.28 square km (32.58 ha), and supports a population of around 700 people.
