= Etal Atoll =

Island in Chuuk, Federated States of Micronesia

Coordinates: 5.5793°N 153.5869°E

Location of Etal Atoll in the Pacific Ocean

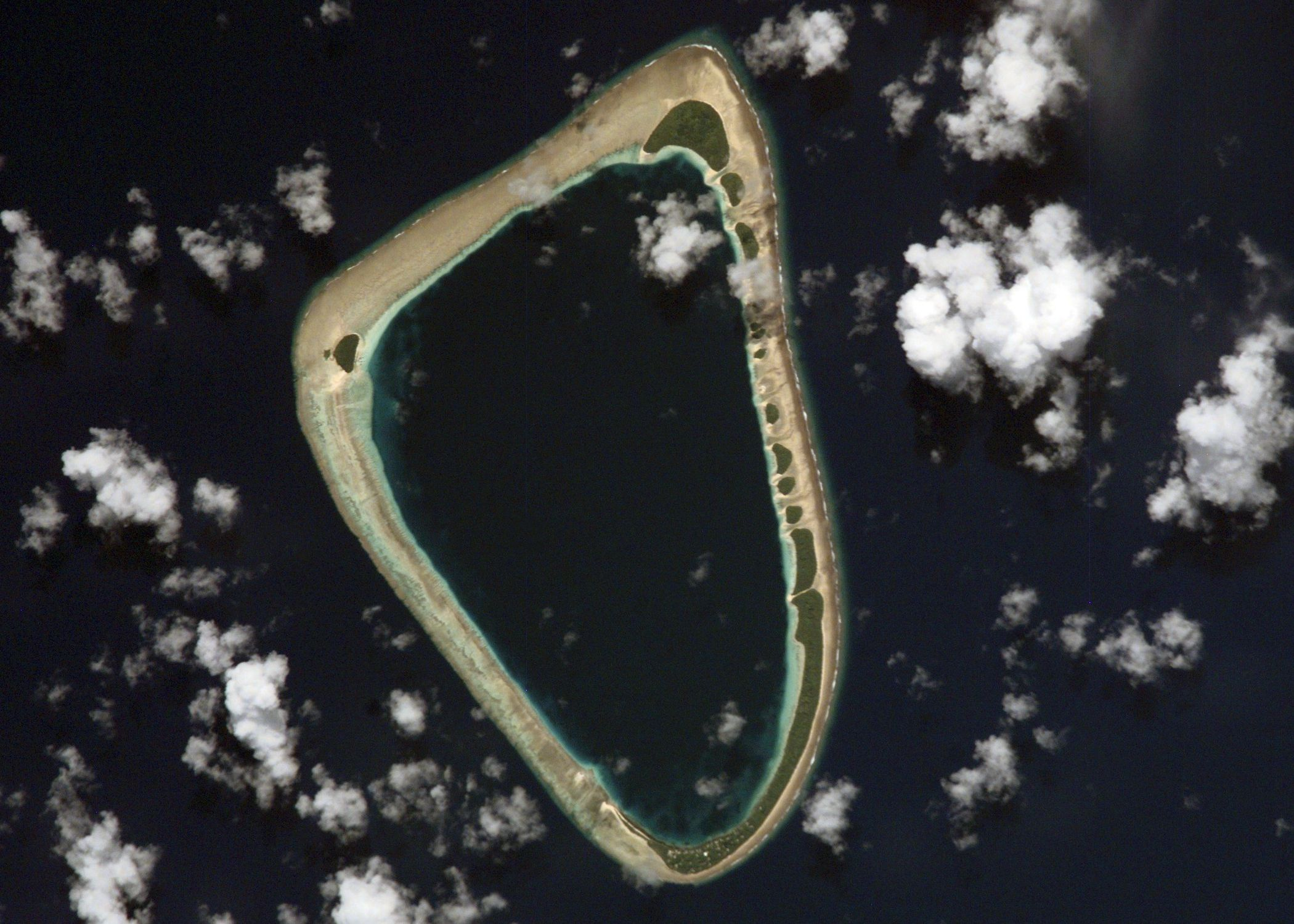
NASA picture of Etal Atoll

Etal or Ettal is an island and municipality in the state of Chuuk, Federated States of Micronesia. Etal is part of the Nomoi Islands group, located about 250 km to the southeast of Chuuk.

== Islands ==
Etal is a small atoll with 17 islands on its reef shelf. Most islands have coconut and breadfruit groves. The main islands are:

- Etal Island, located in the SE part of the atoll, is the largest. Etal Island is a municipality on its own with 267 inhabitants in the 2000 census.
- Parang, located in the north, is the second largest island
- Unon is an isolated island in the western rim.

== History ==
Etal was first sighted by Europeans by the Spanish expedition of Álvaro de Saavedra shortly after August 1528 in its first attempt to return to New Spain.
