= Losap =

Island in Chuuk State, Federal States of Micronesia

Coordinates: 6°53′40″N 152°44′15″E

Location of Losap Atoll in the Pacific Ocean

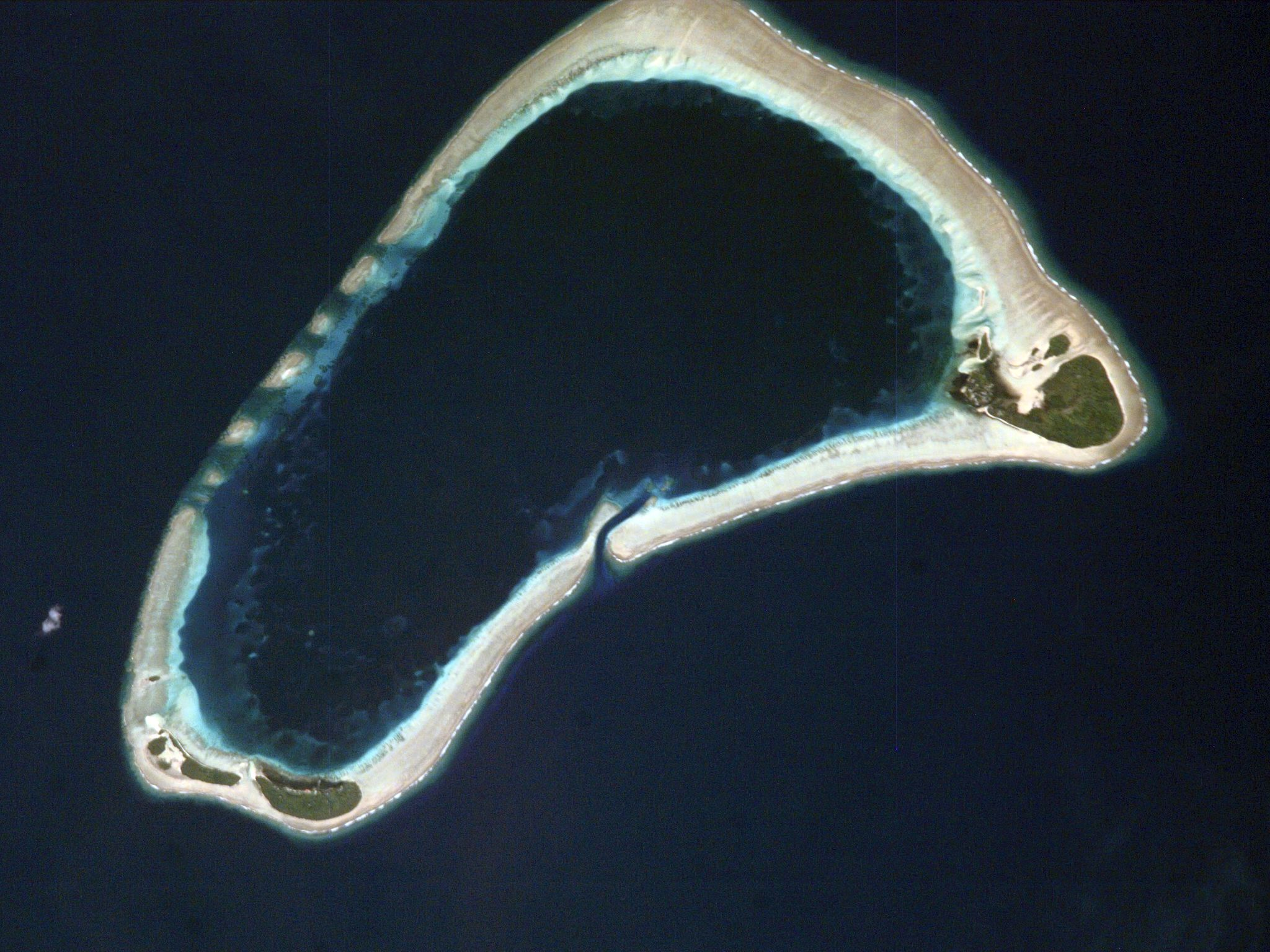
NASA picture of Losap Atoll

Losap is an atoll located in the Eastern Islands or Upper Mortlock Islands group in the outer islands region of the state of Chuuk in the Federated States of Micronesia. It is located 81 km (50 mi) to the SE of Chuuk.

Losap is also the name of one of the four islands in the atoll. There are 3 villages in Losap: Pekias, Sotiw, and Lukan which also have groups in the villages.

== Linguistics ==
The outer islands have different ways of saying Chuukese words; their accent is different from the Chuuk Lagoon people.

For example, these are the way some of the islands have different pronunciations or completely different words.
Lagoon People: sile Losap: kile English: knowledge
lagoon people: oput Losap: amwusak English: hate
lagoon people: emenimen Losap: amelimel English: Smile

== Villages and groups ==
Pekias	Lukan	Sotiw	Pesilim/Fesinim
Lemok(Sota)	Angeru	Peichen/Leparas	Malaio
Letou	Lechapetiw	Imwenikau	Uchukai
Fanmok		Tiela/Iluuk	
Sitowa		Latulua	
Fangeta		Linkul	
Alingawa			
