= Habele =

The Habele Outer Island Education Fund (or simply Habele) is a South Carolina–based charitable organization serving K-12 aged students in Micronesia. Habele's initial geographic focus was the so-called "Outer Islands" of Yap State as well as lagoon and outer islands in neighboring Chuuk State in the Federated States of Micronesia. It now serves students of all backgrounds throughout the Freely Associated States.

== Background ==
The organization was founded by a group of former Peace Corps volunteers who served in Micronesia, and it received IRS nonprofit status in September 2006. The charity has no salaried employees, relying on volunteers, donors and educators in the US and across Micronesia. Habele's initial geographic focus was the so-called "Outer Islands" of Ulithi, Woleai, and Satawal, Eauripik, Ifalik, and Lamotrek in Yap State as well as lagoon and outer islands in neighboring Chuuk state. Beginning in 2013, the nonprofit expanded to serve Micronesian students of all backgrounds throughout the entire Federated States of Micronesia (FSM). and into neighboring Palau and the Marshall Islands. In contrast to bilateral aid provided by the US Government to Micronesia's public sector through the Compact of Free Association ,

Habele targets support for local schools and civil society, emphasizing competition, incentives, and ownership in order to "change attitudes and expectations" among community members." One former US diplomat described the organization as "fulfilling a unique and critical role in FSM's development."

== Tuition scholarships ==
The fund awards scholarships to students attending primary and secondary private schools and provides material donations to small public schools. In the first year of operation $2,890 in scholarships were awarded. Scholarships for 2007-08 exceeded $3,500. The issuance of scholarships in 2008–09, exceeding $5,000, was described by the Peace Corps Micronesia Country Director as "particularly important" for expanding education opportunities because students living outside Micronesia's four state capitals have very limited access to formal education options. A total of 21 scholarships were issued for the 2010–11 school year.

South Carolina State Senators Glenn McConnell and Robert Ford of Charleston, South Carolina drew attention to Habele, when the charity announced $7,500 in scholarships for sixteen elementary and high school students in 2009. Louis J. Rama, a senior consul at the Federated States of Micronesia Consulate on Guam, called for the expansion of this and other programs supporting low-income students through tuition assistance.

The donor-financed tuition payments awarded by Habele are a form of private vouchers. Unlike public school vouchers, private vouchers are not funded by the government. The use of private vouchers for low-income students has been described as a tool for facilitating education reform without becoming immersed in politics.

Several of the annual tuition scholarships are named for individual Americans whose life or work Habele cites as having "embodied the best of the longstanding U.S.-Micronesian partnership.". These include a United States Navy Doctor, a former official with the Trust Territory of the Pacific Islands, and a former Peace Corps Volunteer who drowned while rescuing a child in Chuuk.

== Language ==
Early in 2010, Habele announced plans to develop and distribute native language materials for educators and students in the outer islands of Yap State, Micronesia. The initial project was a Ulithian to English dictionary. This was the first rigorous documentation of the Ulithian language and copies were provided to educators and students throughout Ulithi and Fais. The authors' stated aim was to create a consistent and intuitive pattern of Roman alphabet spelling useful for native Ulithian and native English speakers.

== Libraries and literacy ==
Donations to schools generally consist of books, school supplies, and classroom instructional materials. Habele has played a major role in the creation of libraries on the isolated atolls of Ulithi and Eauripik. English language dictionaries have also been provided to students, including a 1,000 dictionary donation in the Fall of 2012 intended to equip every middle school student throughout Yap State with a personal dictionary for home and classroom use.

In 2020 Habele introduced direct book donations, providing books on a monthly basis to children from birth to the age of five in the State of Yap. The program, known locally as "Young Island Readers," has been described by a high school principal on Yap as "a powerful tool for increasing literacy among children here on Yap."

== Extracurricular ==
Habele also supports programs that engage students outside the traditional classroom. These include financial and material support for the creation of traditional dugout canoes by high school aged boys. as well as creation of after school clubs for robotics competitions between high schools In May 2012, Oceania's first ever Vex Robot competition was held in the State of Yap. Teams representing Yap Catholic High School and the Yap Seventh-Day Adventist School completed a public competition and demonstrated using robotics kits donated by Habele. By 2017, the league had grown to the point where a team from Yap represented all of Micronesia at the FIRST Global international robotics competition in Washington, D.C.
