= Yap High School =

Location
- Colonia; Micronesia
- Coordinates: 9.503510799999999°N 138.10059019999994°E

Information
- Type: High school
- School district: Yap State Department of Education
- Principal: Domingo Techur
- Grades: 9-12
- Website: yapmicronesia.wixsite.com/yaphighschool

Yap High School (YHS) is a secondary school in Rull Municipality, Yap Island, Yap State, Federated States of Micronesia. It is a part of the Yap State Department of Education, along with two other public secondary schools in Yap State.

Most of its current buildings were built between the late 1960s to the middle of the 1970s, a period when several other public high schools were built in the Trust Territory of the Pacific Islands.

In April 2015, Outer Islands High School in Ulithi was damaged. Therefore 12th grade students were sent to Yap High School complete their education.

== See also ==
- Education in the Federated States of Micronesia
