= Nimpal Channel Marine Conservation Area =

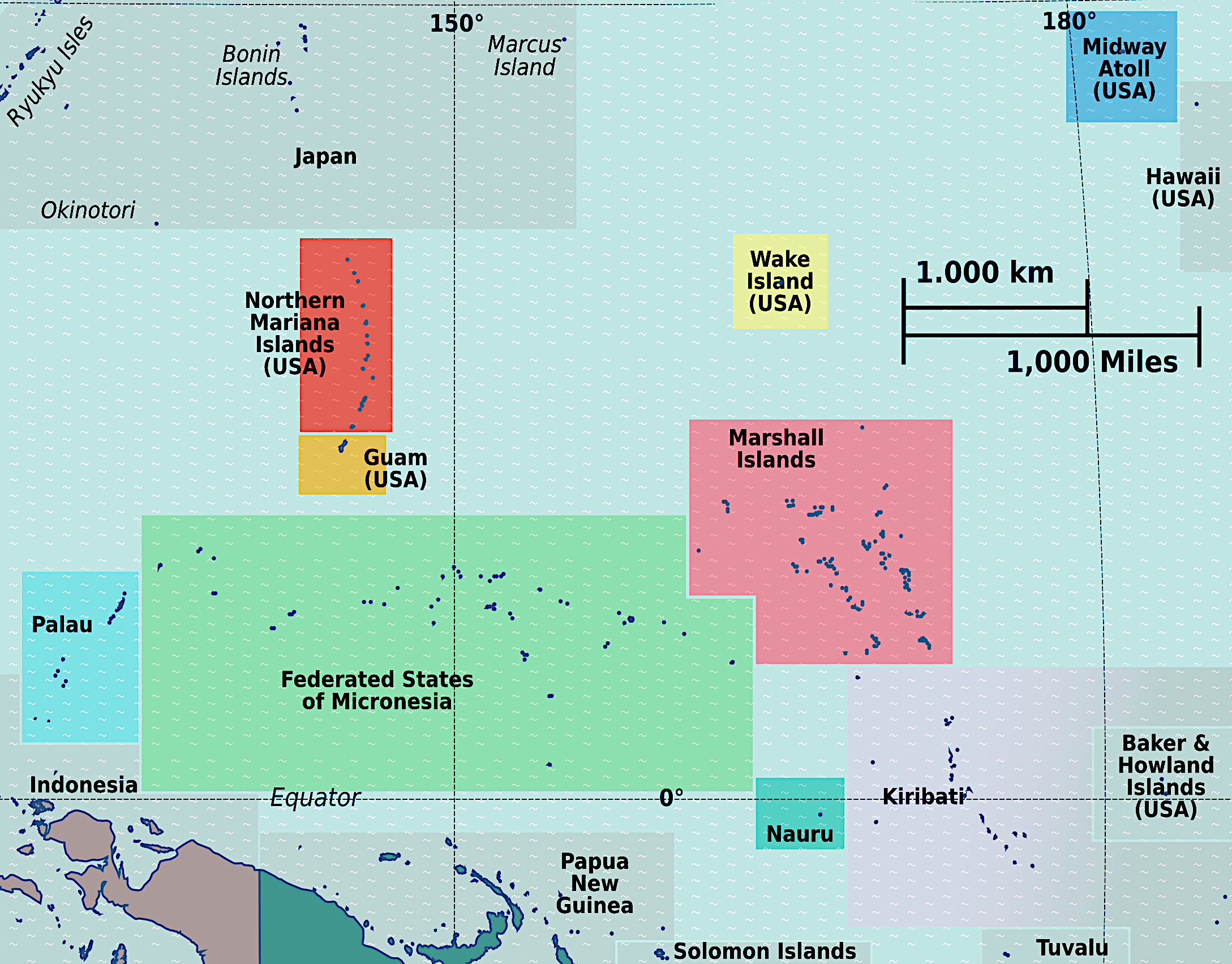
- Location within Micronesia
- Location: Yap, Federated States of Micronesia
- Nearest city: Okaw and Kaday
- Coordinates: 9°33′07″N 138°04′24″E
- Area: 77 hectares (190 acres)

Nimpal Channel Marine Conservation Area is a 77 hectares (190 acres) community-based conservation area located on western side of Yap's main island, in the Federated States of Micronesia. It is a joint initiative between the Okaw and Kaday villages within the Weloy municipality, and the Yap Conservation Action Planning.

The Nimpal Channel MCA was originally established with the idea of protecting fish stocks, and over time it gained in importance due to its resistance to the Acanthaster planci, better known as the crown-of-thorns sea star (COTS), which began inhabiting coral reefs in 2009. and with its pronounced predatory function, it began to disrupt life around coral reefs.

The decision to declare the nearby mangrove forests a mangrove sanctuary has greatly contributed to the recovery of the ecosystem, because the mangroves filter the water that flows into the Nimpal Channel MCA and surrounding areas.
