= Spanish Fort (Yap) =

- U.S. National Register of Historic Places
- Location within Federated States of Micronesia
- Location: Weloy, Colonia, Yap State, Federated States of Micronesia
- Coordinates: 9°30′52″N 138°7′36″E
- Area: 0.3 acres (0.12 ha)
- Built: 1887
- NRHP reference No.: 76002215
- Added to NRHP: September 30, 1976

The Spanish Fort in Colonia, the capital of Yap State in the Federated States of Micronesia, is a historic seat of power on the island of Yap. Only foundational remnants of the 19th-century Spanish fortification survive, on a property now occupied by the local government. The site was also where German and Japanese administrators had their headquarters during their respective periods of administration in the decades of the 20th century before World War II. The foundation was built of stone and cement, and is still accessible via its original steps.

The fort's remains were listed on the United States National Register of Historic Places in 1976, a time when Yap and the other Caroline Islands were part of the US-administered Trust Territory of the Pacific Islands.
