= Colonia, Federated States of Micronesia =

Capital of Yap State

Colonia
- Urban area
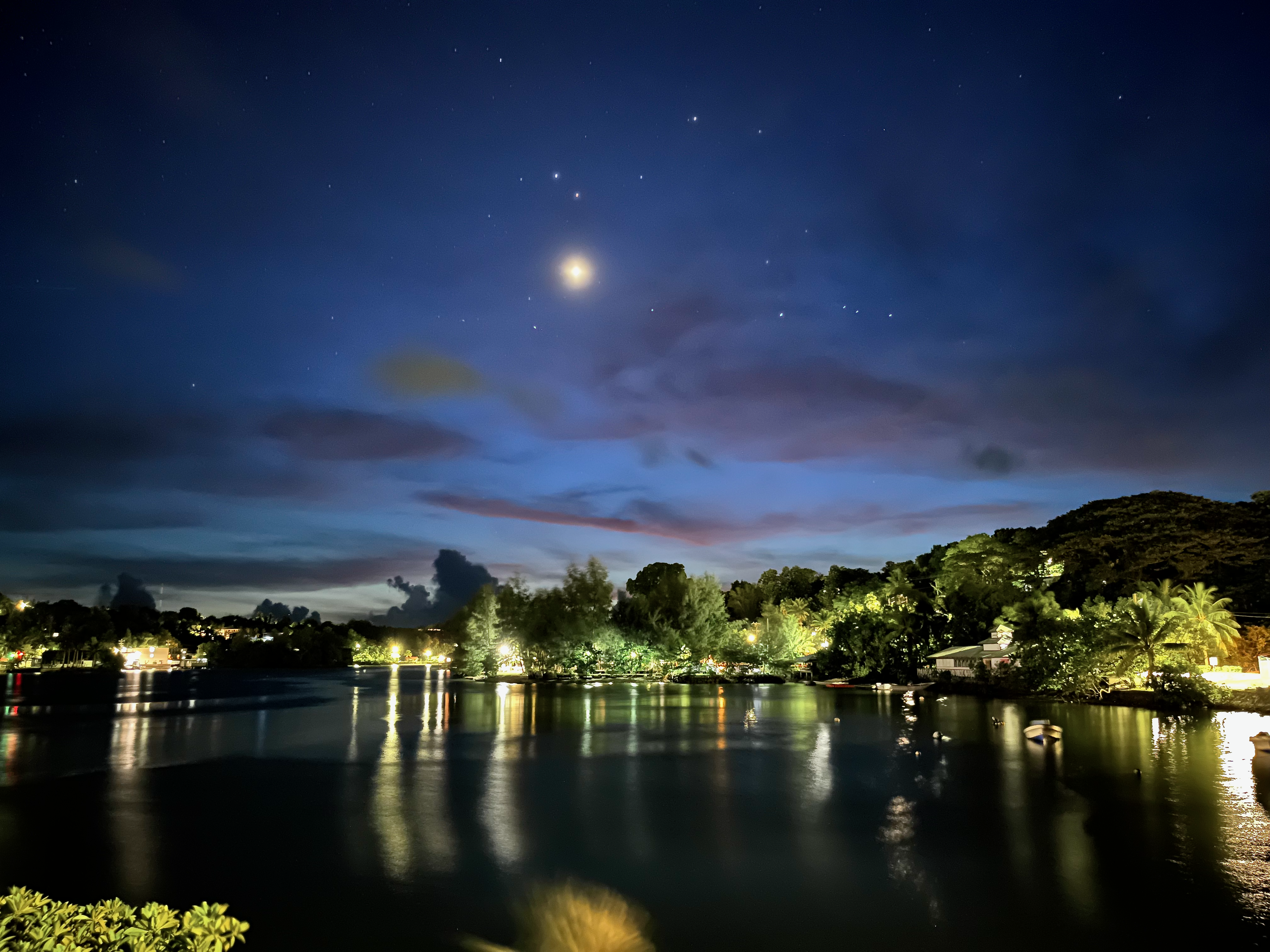
- Interactive map of Colonia
- Coordinates: 9°31′00″N 138°07′17″E
- Country: Federated States of Micronesia
- State: Yap
- Municipalities: Rull and Weloy

Population (2010)
  - Total: 3,126
- ZIP Code: 96943

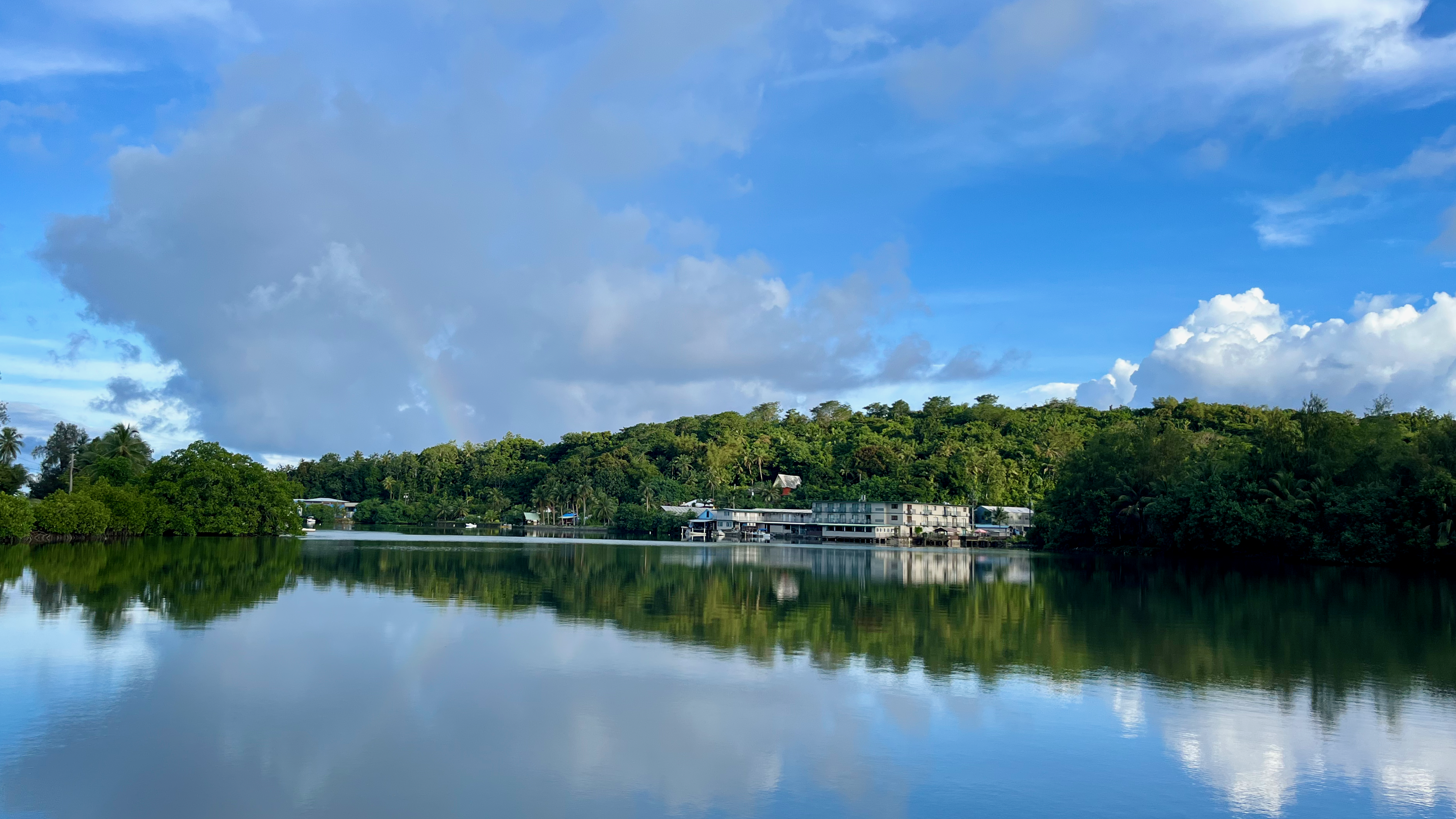
A view of town from the circumnavigational road around Chamorro Bay

Colonia is an urban area between the municipalities of Rull and Weloy which serves as the capital of Yap State, one of the states in the Federated States of Micronesia. It’s not to be confused with Kolonia, the capital of Pohnpei State. It administers both Yap proper and some 13 atolls and islands reaching to the east and south for some 800 kilometers (500 miles).

The 2010 Census population was 3,126.

A Spanish Catholic mission was established in Colonia in 1885, during Yap's time as a colony of Spain.

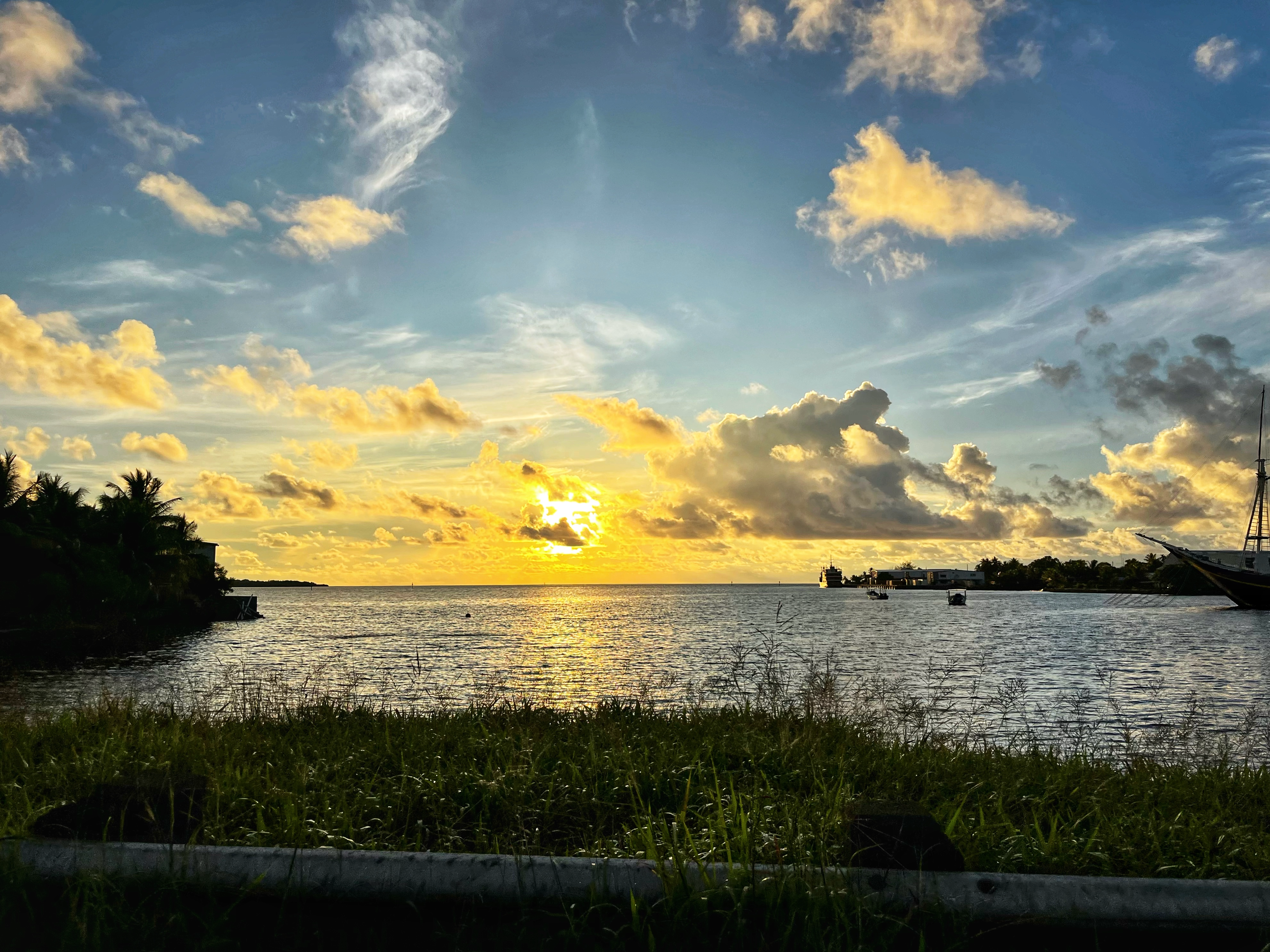
Sunrise over Tomil Harbor in Colonia

Tamil Harbor is the main port of Yap State. Ships have to travel through a 2.5-kilometer-long (1 1/2-mile) reef-bordered passageway to reach the port, where there is a 70-meter-long (230-foot) small craft wharf. There are various hotels, restaurants, shops and a medical store as well as a hospital and banks in Colonia.

Yap is famous for its Rai stones, traditional money made of limestone, which was brought from neighbouring islands in Palau. Many rai stones are now placed in front of meetinghouses and around village courts. Many are kept along pathways called malal or stone money bank. A malal consisting of many different rai stones can be visited in the south of Colonia.

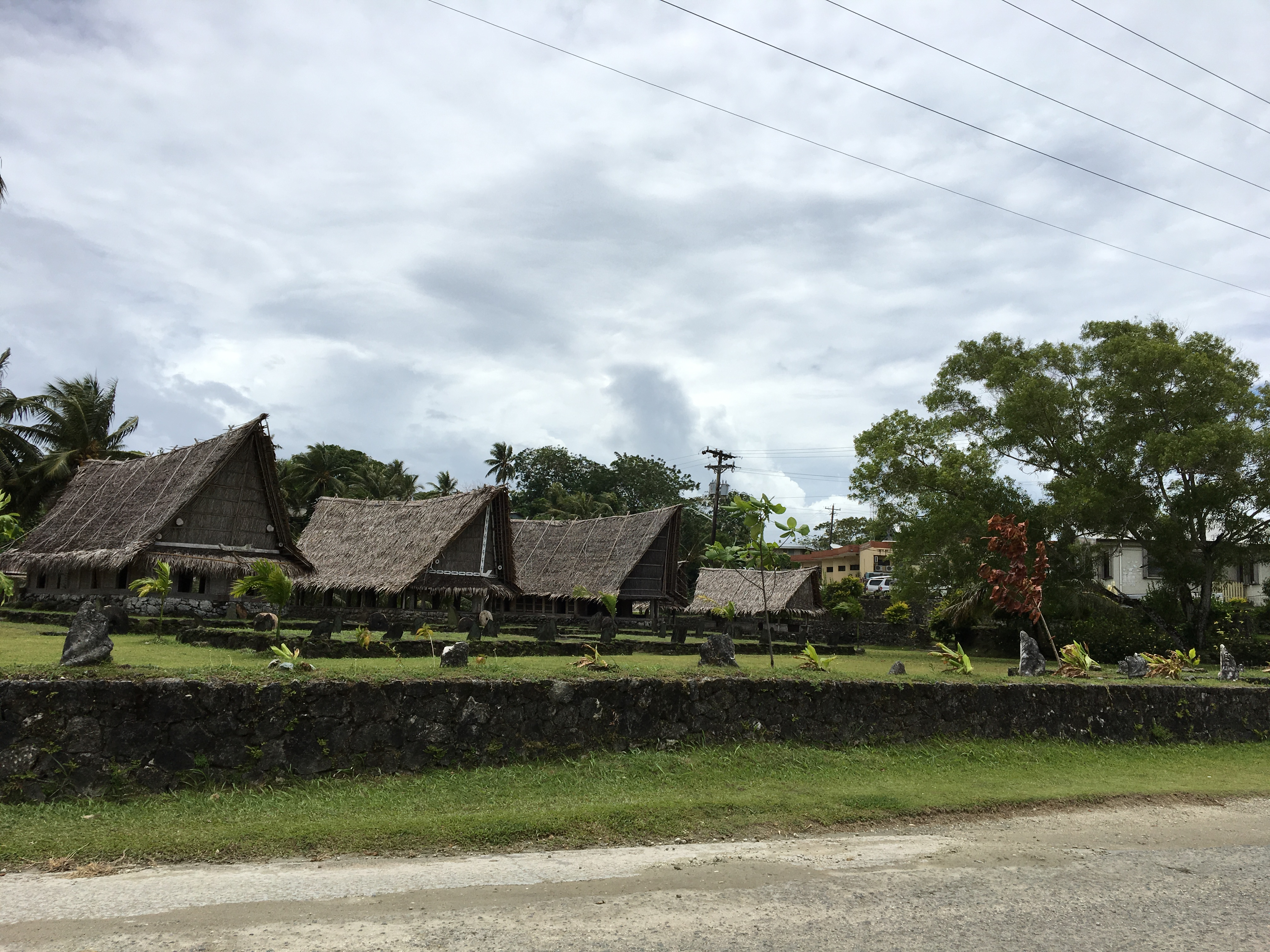
Street view of the Yap Living History Museum in 2017

Yap Living History Museum, consisting of various buildings built in the traditional style, was founded in 2005. Sunset Park is known for its beautiful view. In World War II Public Memorial Park several war memorials were erected. Several families in Yap earn their livelihood by building pirogues traditionally. In Yap Traditional Navigation Society in Colonia, where older navigators teach navigation skills to the younger generation, pirogue-building from a newly felled tree can be observed.

Remnants of a Spanish fort dating from 1887 can be visited close to the legislature building. The protestant church of Liebenzell Mission is sightworthy as well. Close to Yap High School, the three German Towers built around 1910 are worth a visit. They were built for telecommunication during the German colonial period of Yap. Their height amounts to approximately 20 feet. Remnants of a German dock can be visited as well.

== Education ==
High schools:

- Yap High School
- Yap Catholic High School
