= Rull Men's Meetinghouse =

- U.S. National Register of Historic Places
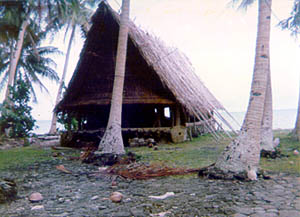

- Location within Federated States of Micronesia
- Location: Rull, Yap, Federated States of Micronesia
- Coordinates: 9°30′21″N 138°7′22″E
- Area: 0.4 acres (0.16 ha)
- NRHP reference No.: 76002214
- Added to NRHP: September 30, 1976

The Rull Men's Meetinghouse (known as a faluw in the Yapese language) is a historic meeting house in Rull, a village on the island of Yap in the Federated States of Micronesia. It is a large rectangular structure, set on a raised stone platform. The flooring consists of treated betelnut palm trunks, and has a steeply pitched roof made of bamboo supports with various types of tropical leaves tied in place using coconut fiber. The faluw, although not the first built on this platform, has historically occupied a central place in the civic life of the community, serving as a place where the men of the village could meet in seclusion, and as a place for social rites.

The meetinghouse was added to the National Register of Historic Places in 1976, when the region was part of the US-administered Trust Territory of the Pacific Islands.
