= Outer Islands High School =

Secondary school in Ulithi, Yap State, Federated States of Micronesia

Location
- Ulithi, Yap State; Micronesia
- Coordinates: 10°01′18″N 139°47′23″E

Information
- Type: High school
- School district: Yap State Department of Education
- Principal: John L. Ugulmar
- Grades: 9-12
- Enrollment: 80
- Student to teacher ratio: 10:1
- Colors: Blue and White
- Website: Official Site

Outer Islands High School (OIHS) is a secondary school in Ulithi, Yap State, Federated States of Micronesia. It is a part of the Yap State Department of Education.

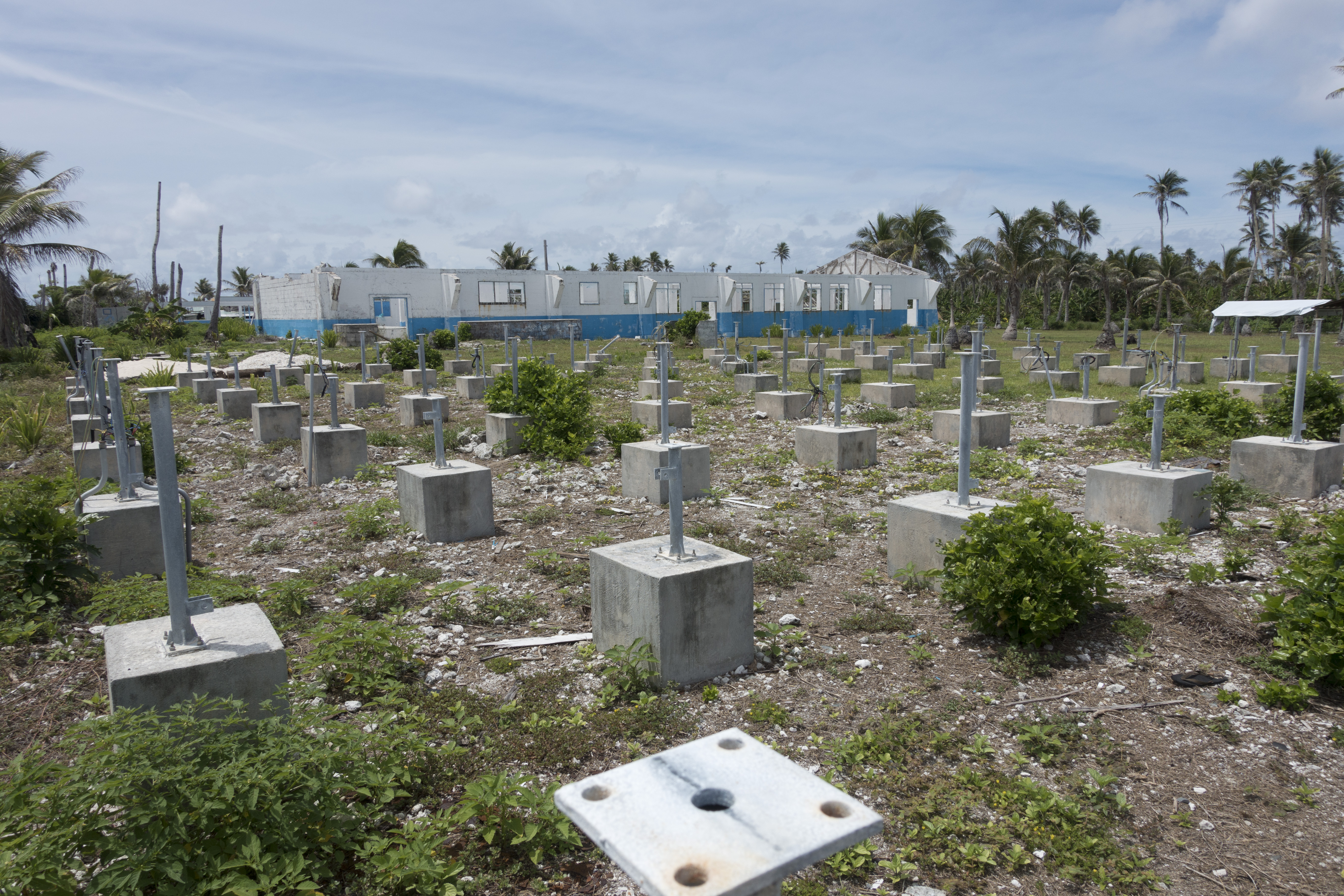
Typhoon Maysak damaged much of the school. Almost all of the roofs were lost, though the concrete walls remain. The foreground was a solar array

In April 2015 the school was damaged by Typhoon Maysak. Therefore 12th-grade students were sent to Yap High School on Yap Island to complete their education.

== See also ==
- Education in the Federated States of Micronesia
