= Ulithian language =

Oceanic language spoken in Micronesia

Ulithian
- Yulidiy
- Native to: Federated States of Micronesia
- Region: Ulithi Atoll
- Native speakers: (3,000 cited 1987)
- Language family: Austronesian: Malayo-Polynesian; Oceanic; Micronesian; Nuclear Micronesian; Chuukic; Ulithian–Woleaian; Ulithian

Official status
- Official language in: Federated States of Micronesia

Language codes
- ISO 639-3: uli
- Glottolog: ulit1238
- ELP: Ulithian
- Ulithian is classified as Severely Endangered by the UNESCO Atlas of the World's Languages in Danger.

Ulithian is the language spoken on Ulithi Atoll and neighboring islands. Ulithian is one of the six official languages of the Federated States of Micronesia. There are some 3,000 speakers, although only 700 of these live on Ulithi Atoll.

In 2010, a Ulithian–English and English–Ulithian dictionary was published by Habele, a US-based charity. The authors' stated aim was to create a consistent and intuitive pattern of Roman alphabet spelling useful for both native Ulithian and native English speakers.

== Introduction ==
=== History ===
Ulithian is a language spoken in Micronesia. The specific islands that Ulithian is spoken in are Ulithi, Ngulu, Sorol, Fais Islands and Eastern Caroline Islands. There are also a few speakers that can be found in the United States. Ulithian has about 3039 speakers, 700 of which reside in Ulithi itself. Many of the other Pacific languages spoken in the surrounding islands are similar to Ulithian which makes it easier for others to understand. In a way, it is a universal language for the area. The people who live in and around Ulithi are classified as Micronesians. Their appearances greatly vary because of all the different people who passed through the area over time. Ulithi has a strong democracy with a king by name voted by the people. Because the Ulithian language is so widely recognized, it holds a good status in the islands. It is also one of the six official languages in the Federated States of Micronesia.

== Phonology ==
=== Consonants ===
	Bilabial		Labio- dental	Dental	Alveolar		Palatal	Velar
	plain	lab.	Labio- dental	Dental	plain	lam.	Palatal	Velar
Nasal	m	mʷ				n̻		ŋ
Plosive	p					t̻	tɕ	k
Fricative		βʷ	f	ð	s		(ɕ)	x
Trill					r			
Approximant		w			l		j	

/s/ may also be heard as [ɕ].

=== Vowels ===
Ulithian has eight vowels which is a large amount for a Pacific language, innovating from a former system of five plain vowels in Proto-Oceanic. They are /i/, /u/, /e/, /ə/, /o/, /ɔ/, /æ/, /a/. They are spelled ⟨i⟩, ⟨u⟩, ⟨e⟩, ⟨ė⟩, ⟨o⟩, ⟨ȯ⟩, ⟨ȧ⟩, ⟨a⟩.

== Grammar ==
=== Reduplication ===
Full reduplication can be used in many ways. It can be used to show a stronger emotion, for example, sig means 'jealous' and sigsig means 'short-tempered' or 'easily set off'. It can also be used for similar things; for example, bbech means 'the color white', and bbechbbech is 'glare' or 'the reflection of the sun'.

== Vocabulary ==
=== Indigenous vocabulary ===
- mwaal – man
- fafel – woman
- mongoi – eat
- maesoer – sleep
- bichikkar – hot
- halloefong – cold
- nguuch – bored

=== Loanwords ===
At various times, Spain, Germany, Japan, and the United States had control over the islands of Ulithi. Each one of these groups left behind words that have been evolved and are now used in the Ulithian language. Linguists have used these words to trace back what items each group introduced to Ulithi.

Spain has had an influence in Ulithi since the early 1500s. They left behind things like foods, religious terms, and animals. Some examples of words from Spanish:

Spanish	Ulithian	English
gato	hatu	cat
flores	floras	flowers
cajón	kahol	crate, box

Since Spain passed through Ulithi for such a long period of time, the words they left were used because they actually left behind those things. Foods like the potato and squash were brought by the Spanish, so Ulithian uses words based on the Spanish words for them. Spain was also Catholic, so Catholic terms were left behind.

Japan occupied Ulithi during the time of World War I and left during or after World War II. Before the World Wars, Japan traded with Ulithi. Since the two countries were trade partners, they needed to know how to communicate. Every so often, young boys would learn the basics of Japanese and because of this, "it is not at all difficult today to find Ulithians who speak and write a bit of Japanese". An example of a word from Japan is denwa, which Ulithian changed to dengwa which means 'telephone'. Japan had such a big impact that the word for battery, denchi, remained the same in Ulithian.

Germany did not occupy Ulithi for long, so they left the least influence and there are almost no words that were left behind and still used. One of the few words that got carried over is mark, a German coin which turned into mak, what Ulithians call the U.S. half dollar.

In 1944, the U.S. task force arrived in Ulithi and there has been an abundance of English loan words since then. The most impact English is having on Ulithian is through the school systems. Words such as 'homework' and 'campus' which in Ulithian are homwork and kampus are very similar.

There are some loan words that have become the official word in Ulithian, but others are used in place of another word. The Spanish word flores, which means 'flowers', was taken and used by Ulithian speakers as floras. According to the Ulithian-English Dictionary written by Neil Mellen and John Hancock, the general word for 'flowers' is floraas, which is close to what is stated in the journal. While the word for 'flower' was similar, the Spanish word for 'table', mesa, was directly taken to use in Ulithian. The Ulithian-English Dictionary says that the translation of table is tiis. This is comparable to speaking pidgin in Hawaii. There are a lot of Japanese words that the majority of people – even if they do not speak Japanese – use, such as shoyu for soy sauce and bocha for a bath.

== Endangerment ==
=== Materials ===
As far as social media such as radio and television, there does not seem to be any in specifically Ulithian but there are some in other surrounding languages. Esikiel Lippwe states in a letter that radio and television stations are very important because they effectively educate and bring awareness to the people about things like health issues.

=== Vitality ===
According to Ethnologue, Ulithian is ranked at an EGIDS level of 5 which means that the language is being used vigorously, but not as a main language. It is most likely being used more by the older generation. There is a possibility of the language dying out, but it is still in good standing (Ethnologue).
