= Rull =

Municipality in Yap, Federated States of Micronesia

Coordinates: 9.4844°N 138.0908°E

- Municipality
- Seal
- Interactive map of Rull
- Country: Federated States of Micronesia
- State: Yap State

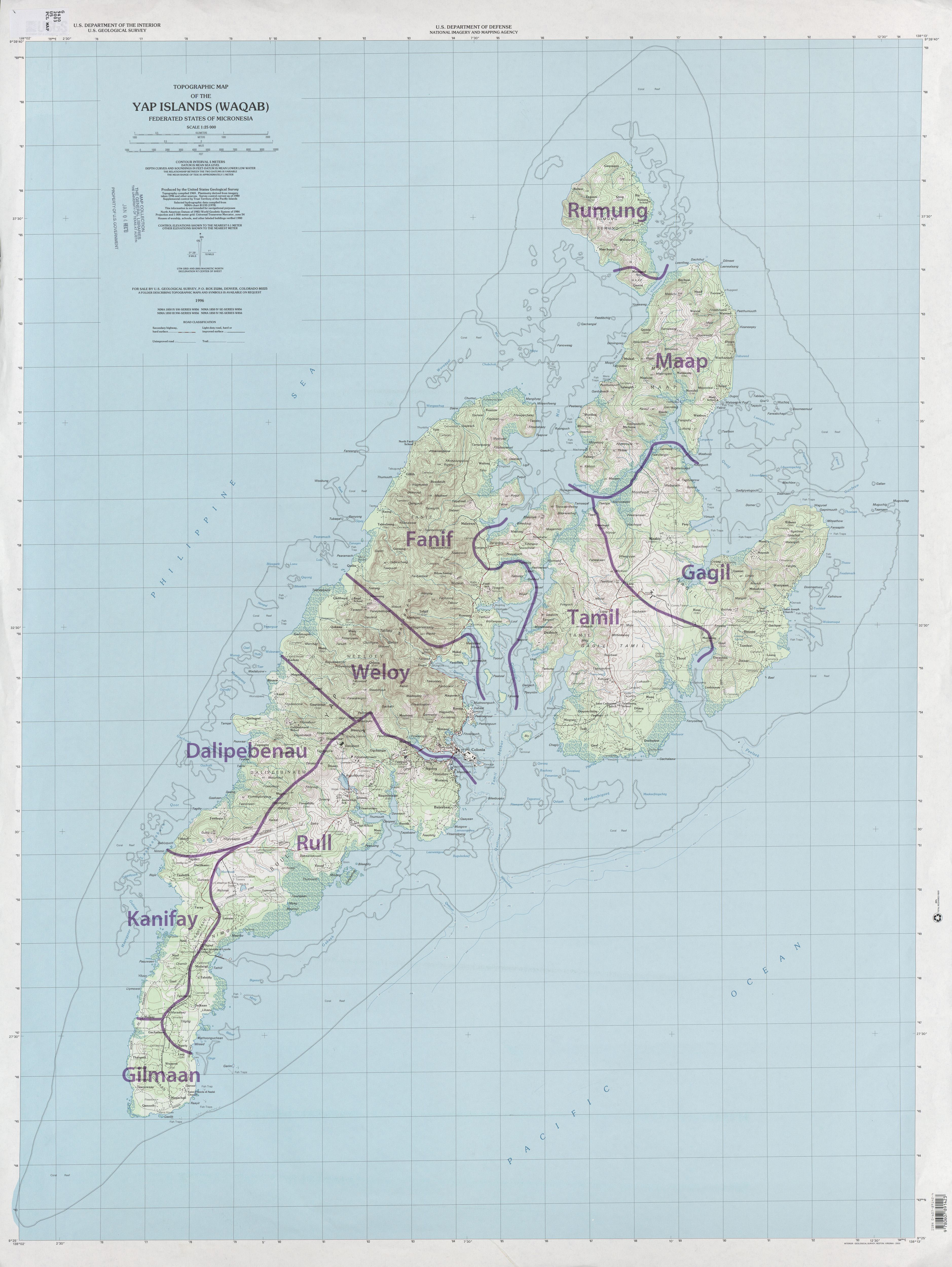
Map of the municipalities of Yap including Rull

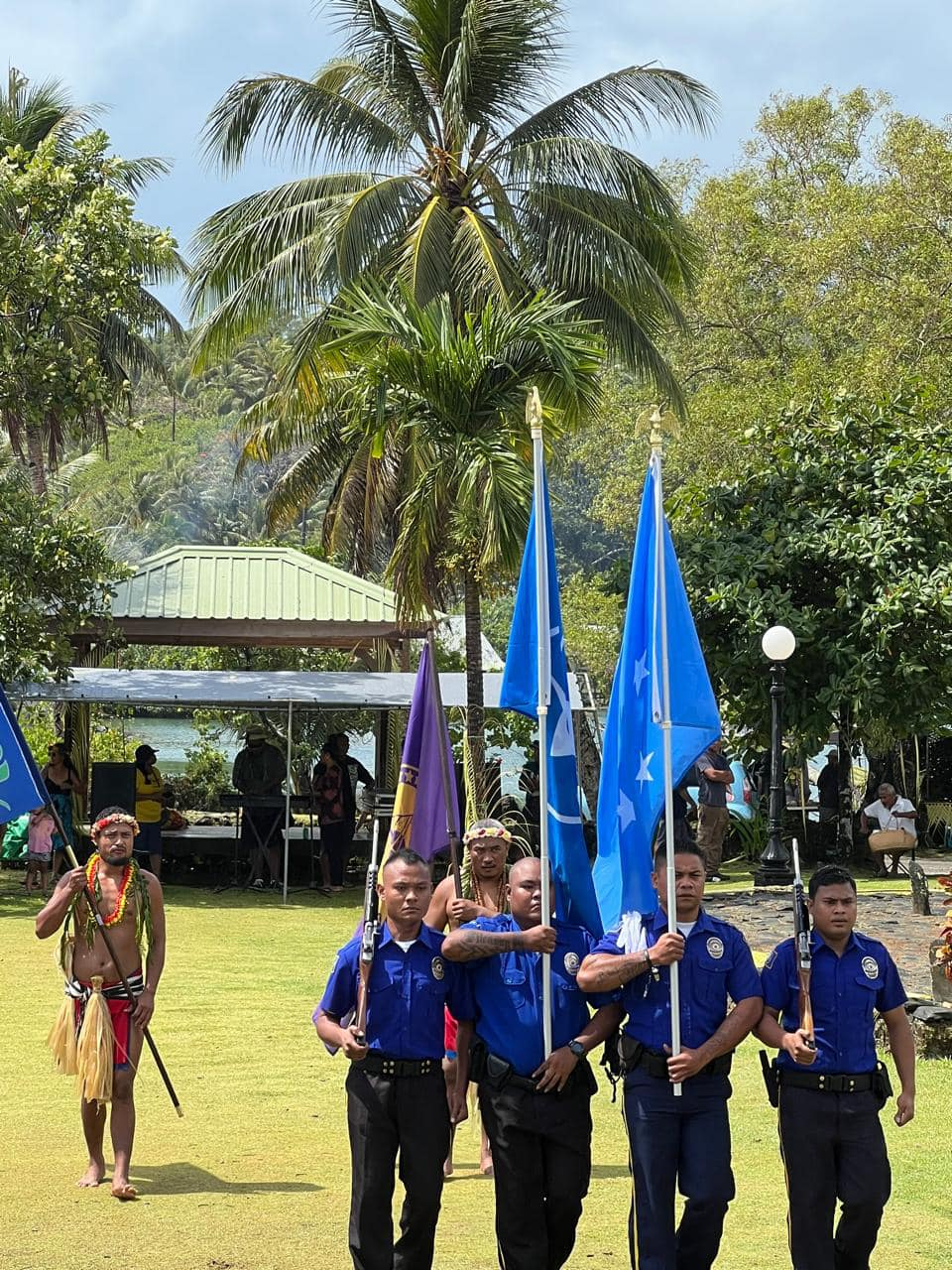
The third flag from right is that of Rull Municipality

Rull (Yapese: Ruul) is a municipality in the southern part of the island Yap, Federated States of Micronesia. It has a traditional dancing ground. Rull has a population of 1,847. The historic Rull Men's Meetinghouse is located within the town.

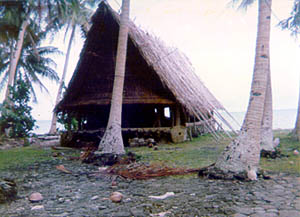
Traditional men's meeting house in Rull

== Education ==
The Yap Campus of the College of Micronesia-FSM, and Yap High School are both located in Yinuf Village of Rull Municipality. Yap Catholic High School is in Lamer Village. Finally, Gaanelay Elementary School and Colonia Middle School are the primary schools in Rull, located in Talguw Village and Dinay Village, respectively.
