= Yap Catholic High School =

University-preparatory school in Micronesia

Coordinates: 9.4916°N 138.0743°E

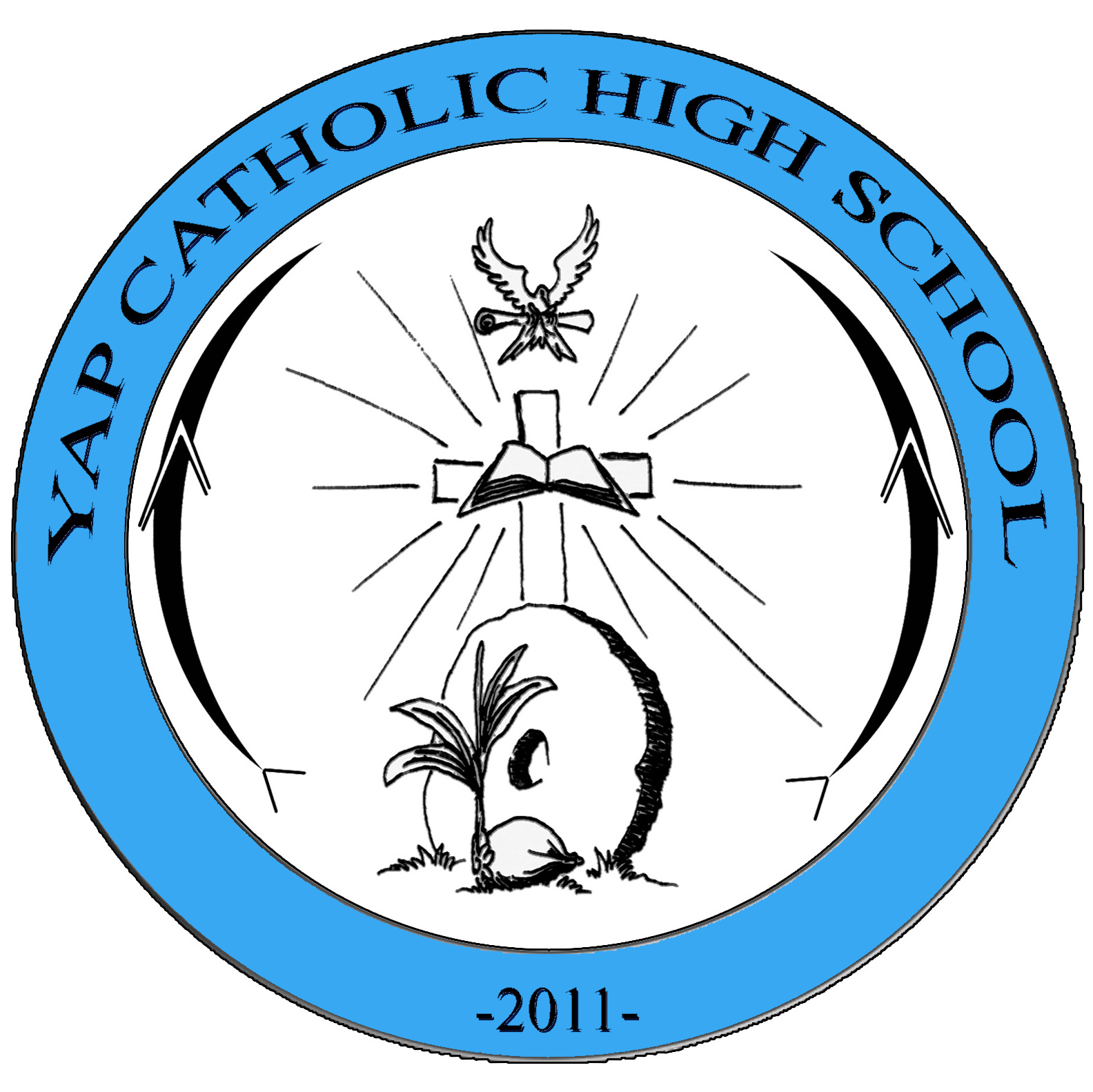
- Education in the Service of God and Others
- Rull, Yap State; Federated States of Micronesia

Information
- Type: Private university-preparatory school
- Religious affiliation: Catholic Latin Rite Jesuit
- Established: 5 September 2011; 15 years ago
- Director: Michael Wiencek
- Principal: Gilippin Pongliyab
- Chaplain: Fr. Rich McAuliff, SJ
- Faculty: 12
- Grades: Upper Secondary (4 years; 8 semesters)
- Campus: 22 acres (89,000 m^{2})
- Colors: Blue, White, Black
- Accreditation: FSM Department of Education, Level 4 accreditation
- Website: www.yapcatholichs.fm

Yap Catholic High School, also referred to as YCHS, is a private, four-year, Catholic, Jesuit-affiliated preparatory high school serving young men and women in the State of Yap, Federated States of Micronesia. YCHS was established in 2011 and operated by the USA East Province of the Society of Jesus. After its first school year out of the St. Mary Mission in Colonia, YCHS opened its new rural campus on August 19, 2012 in Lamer Village, Rull Municipality, State of Yap, Federated States of Micronesia. Its campus has 8.9 hectares (22 acres) of land bordered by tropical dry forest and savanna, and a pond nicknamed the Machbab Mere beside the four classroom buildings. At least two buildings are powered by solar panels.

As a relatively young university preparatory school, a large percentage of YCHS alumni are currently studying in universities either within the FSM or overseas. Countries where the alumni are currently studying include the FSM, Palau, Fiji, Japan, the United States including its Pacific territory of Guam, and the Philippines.

In summer 2023, the library collection of the Micronesian Seminar was moved from Xavier High School in Chuuk to its new home in a dedicated building at the YCHS campus.

== Academic curriculum ==
As a university preparatory school, YCHS had developed an academic curriculum that is able to equip its students for university entrance and career as well as prepare students in terms of their spiritual formation in the Catholic faith. For four years, all students are required to take courses in the Catholic religion, mathematics, science, English language arts, social studies and literature.

Additional courses also offered at YCHS include supplemental math review, algebra review, silent reading, physical education, art, student skill building, computer literacy, health, SAT preparation and college counseling.

Students at YCHS take the SAT offered by the College Board as the university entrance examination of choice.

== Finances ==
The YCHS monthly tuition rate was $70 with the full-year tuition rate, which included the Summer Session tuition, as $700. However, YCHS does offer financial assistance options to students and families in need.

== See also ==
- Education in the Federated States of Micronesia
