= Weloy =

Municipality in Yap, Federated States of Micronesia

Coordinates: 9.5321°N 138.1054°E

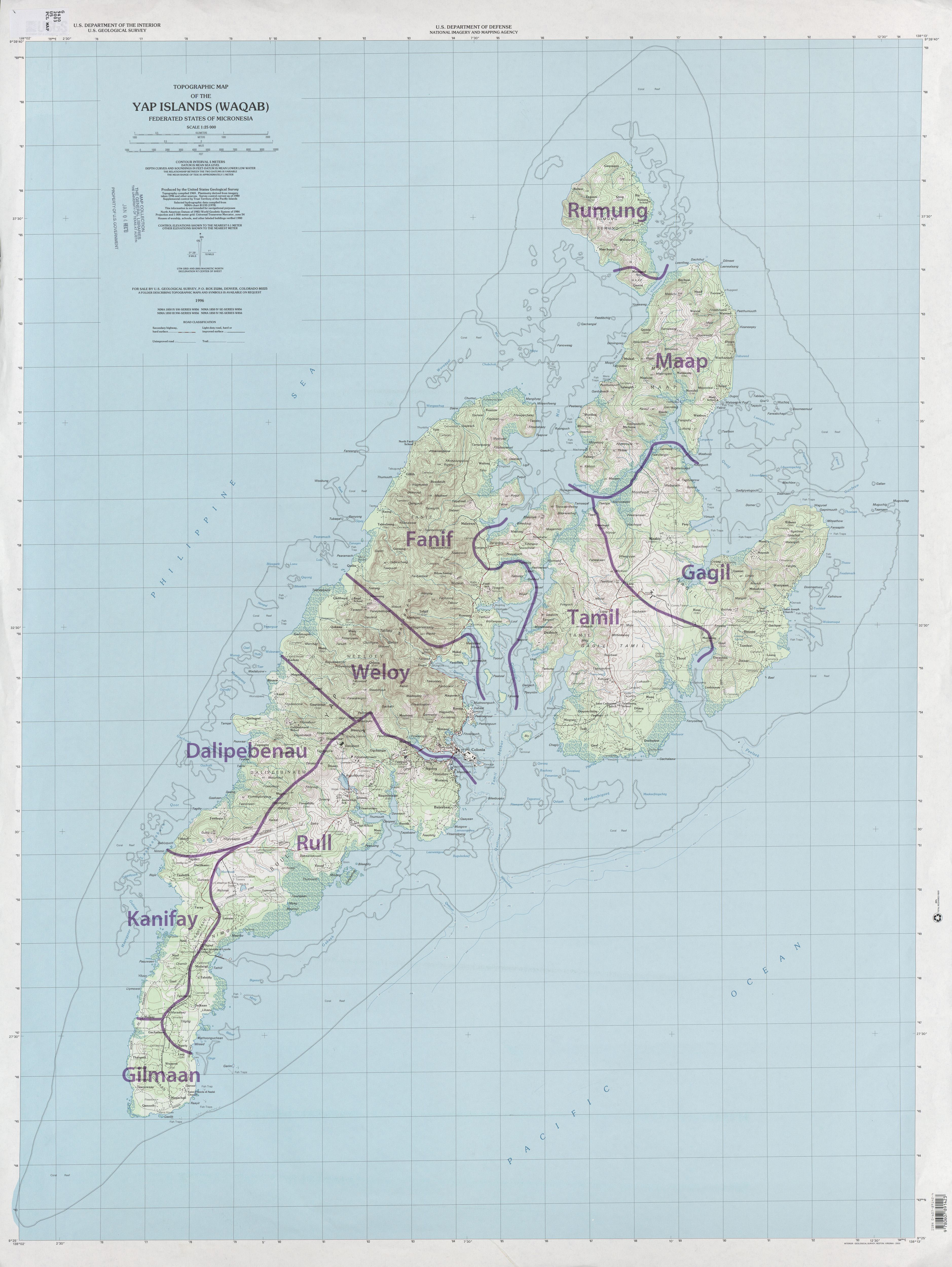
Map of the municipalities of Yap including Weloy

Weloy (Yapese: Weeloey) is a village and municipality in the state of Yap, Federated States of Micronesia. Colonia, the capital of Yap State is located in Weloy.
