= History of architecture =

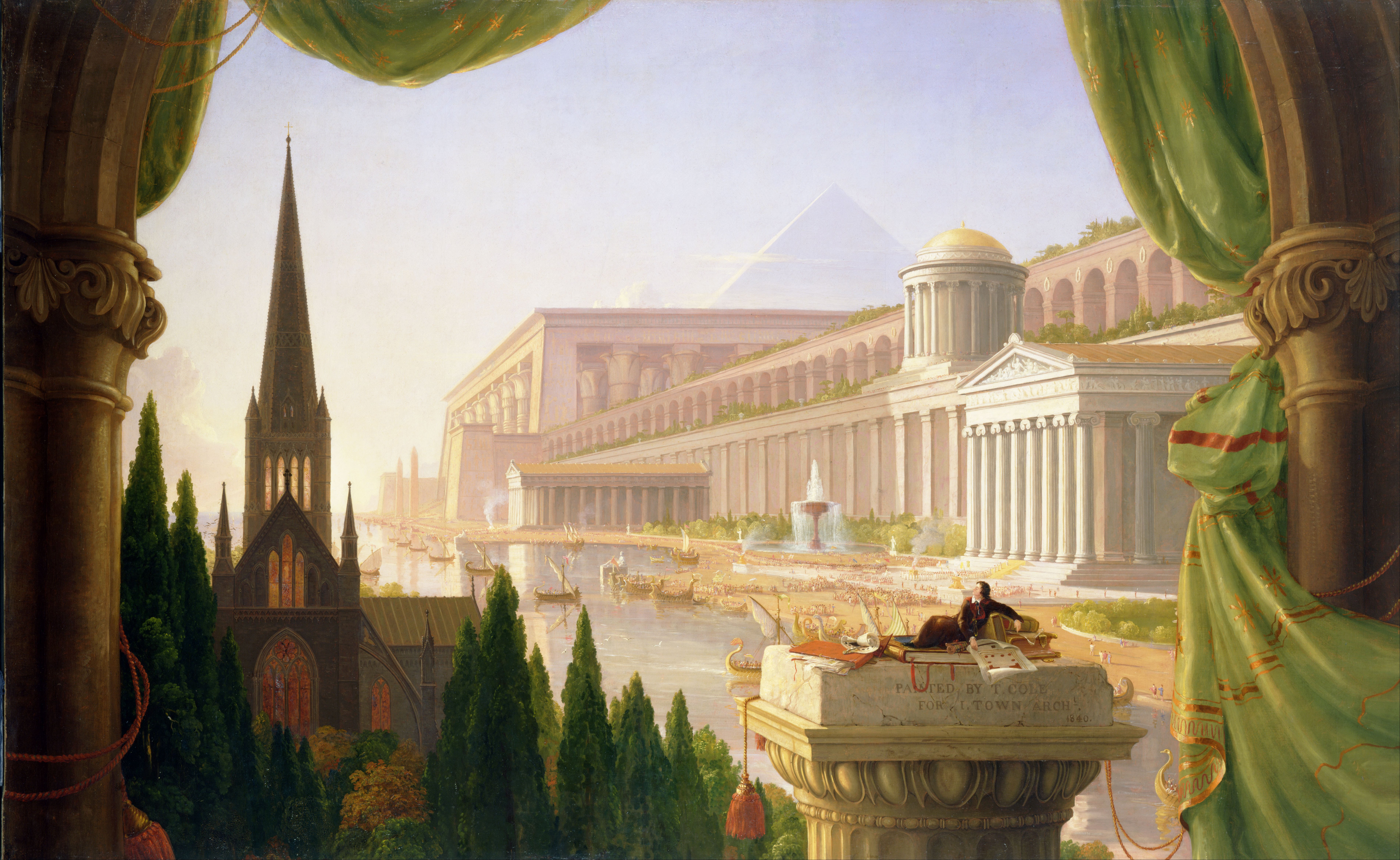
The Architect's Dream, by Thomas Cole, 1840, oil on canvas

The history of architecture traces the changes in architecture through various traditions, regions, overarching stylistic trends, and dates. The beginnings of all these traditions is thought to be humans satisfying the very basic need of shelter and protection. The term "architecture" generally refers to buildings, but in its essence is much broader, including fields we now consider specialized forms of practice, such as urbanism, civil engineering, naval, military, and landscape architecture.

Trends in architecture were influenced, among other factors, by technological innovations, particularly in the 19th, 20th and 21st centuries. The improvement and/or use of steel, cast iron, tile, reinforced concrete, and glass helped for example Art Nouveau appear and made Beaux Arts more grandiose.

== Paleolithic ==
Humans and their ancestors have been creating various types of shelters for at least hundreds of thousands of years, and shelter-building may have been present early in hominin evolution. All great apes will construct "nests" for sleeping, albeit at different frequencies and degrees of complexity. Chimpanzees regularly make nests out of bundles of branches woven together; these vary depending on the weather (nests have thicker bedding when cool and are built with larger, stronger supports in windy or wet weather). Orangutans currently make the most complex nests out of all non-human great apes, complete with roofs, blankets, pillows, and "bunks".

It has been argued that nest-building practices were even more important to the evolution of human creativity and construction skill than tool use, as hominins became required to build nests not just in uniquely adapted circumstances but as forms of signalling. Retaining arboreal features like highly prehensile hands for the expert construction of nests and shelters would have also benefitted early hominins in unpredictable environments and changing climates. Many hominins, especially the earliest ones such as Ardipithecus and Australopithecus retained such features and may have chosen to build nests in trees where available. The development of a "home base" 2 million years ago may have also fostered the evolution of constructing shelters or protected caches. Regardless of the complexity of nest-building, early hominins may still have still slept in more or less 'open' conditions, unless the opportunity of a rock shelter was afforded. These rock shelters could be used as-is with little more amendments than nests and hearths, or in the case of established bases —especially among later hominins— they could be personalized with rock art (in the case of Lascaux) or other types of aesthetic structures (in the case of the Bruniquel Cave among the Neanderthals) In cases of sleeping in open ground, Dutch ethologist Adriaan Kortlandt once proposed that hominins could have built temporary enclosures of thorny bushes to deter predators, which he supported using tests that showed lions becoming averse to food if near thorny branches.

In 2000, archaeologists at the Meiji University in Tokyo claimed to have found 2 pentagonal alignments of post holes on a hillside near the village of Chichibu, interpreting it as two huts dated around 500,000 years old and built by Homo erectus. Currently, the earliest confirmed purpose-built structures are in France at the site of Terra Amata, along with the earliest evidence of artificial fire, c. 400,000 years ago. Due to the perishable nature of shelters of this time, it is difficult to find evidence for dwellings beyond hearths and the stones that may make up a dwelling's foundation. Near Wadi Halfa, Sudan, the Arkin 8 site contains 100,000 year old circles of sandstone that were likely the anchor stones for tents. In eastern Jordan, post hole markings in the soil give evidence to houses made of poles and thatched brush around 20,000 years ago. In areas where bone — especially mammoth bone — is a viable material, evidence of structures preserve much more easily, such as the mammoth-bone dwellings among the Mal'ta-Buret' culture 24–15,000 years ago and at Mezhirich 15,000 years ago. The Upper Paleolithic in general is characterized by the expansion and cultural growth of anatomically modern humans (as well as the cultural growth of Neanderthals, despite their steady extinction at this time), and although we currently lack data for dwellings built before this time, the dwellings of this era begin to more commonly show signs of aesthetic modification, such as at Mezhirich where engraved mammoth tusks may have formed the "facade" of a dwelling.

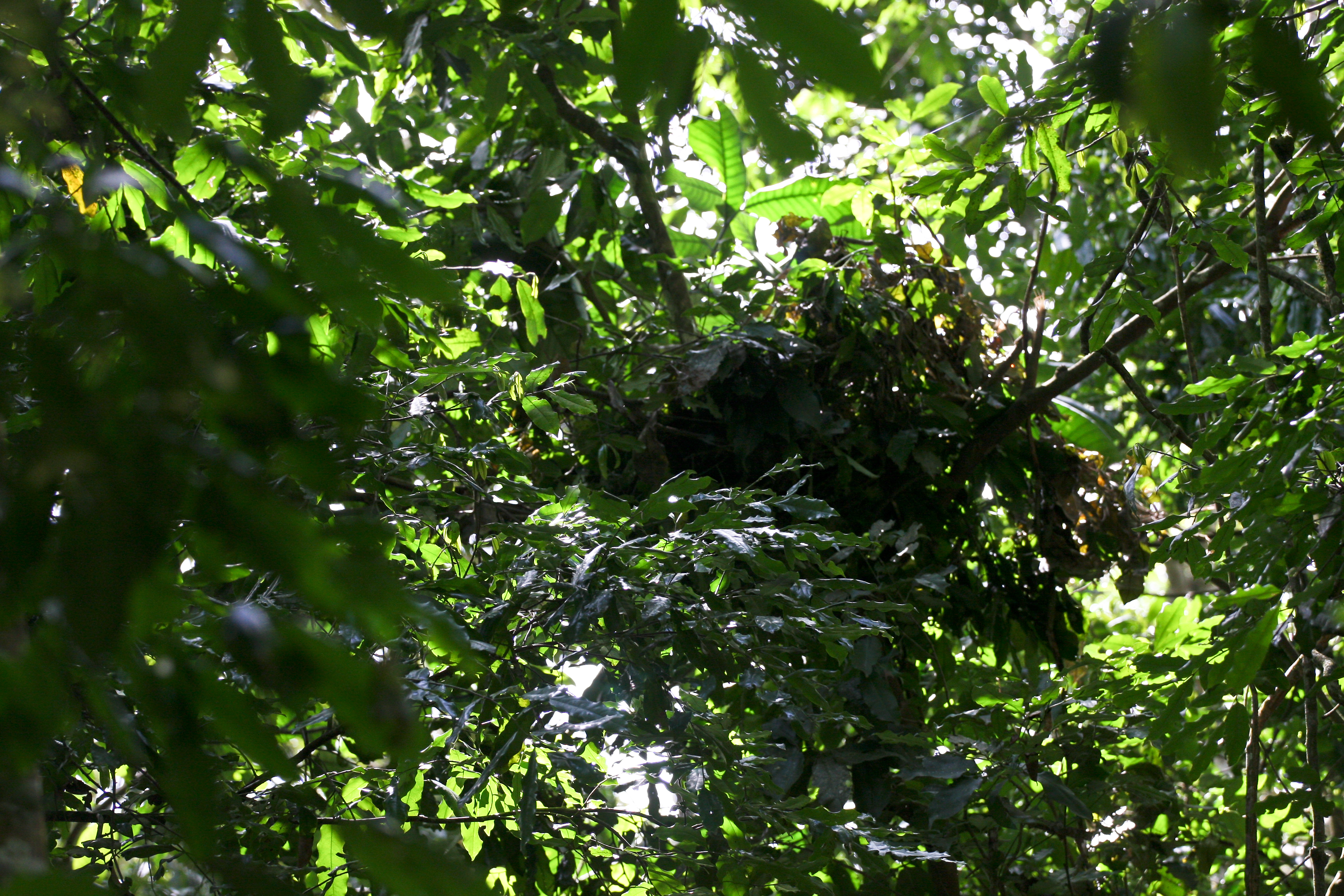
Chimpanzee nest. Later hominins may have developed shelter-building traditions from such earlier nest-building practices.

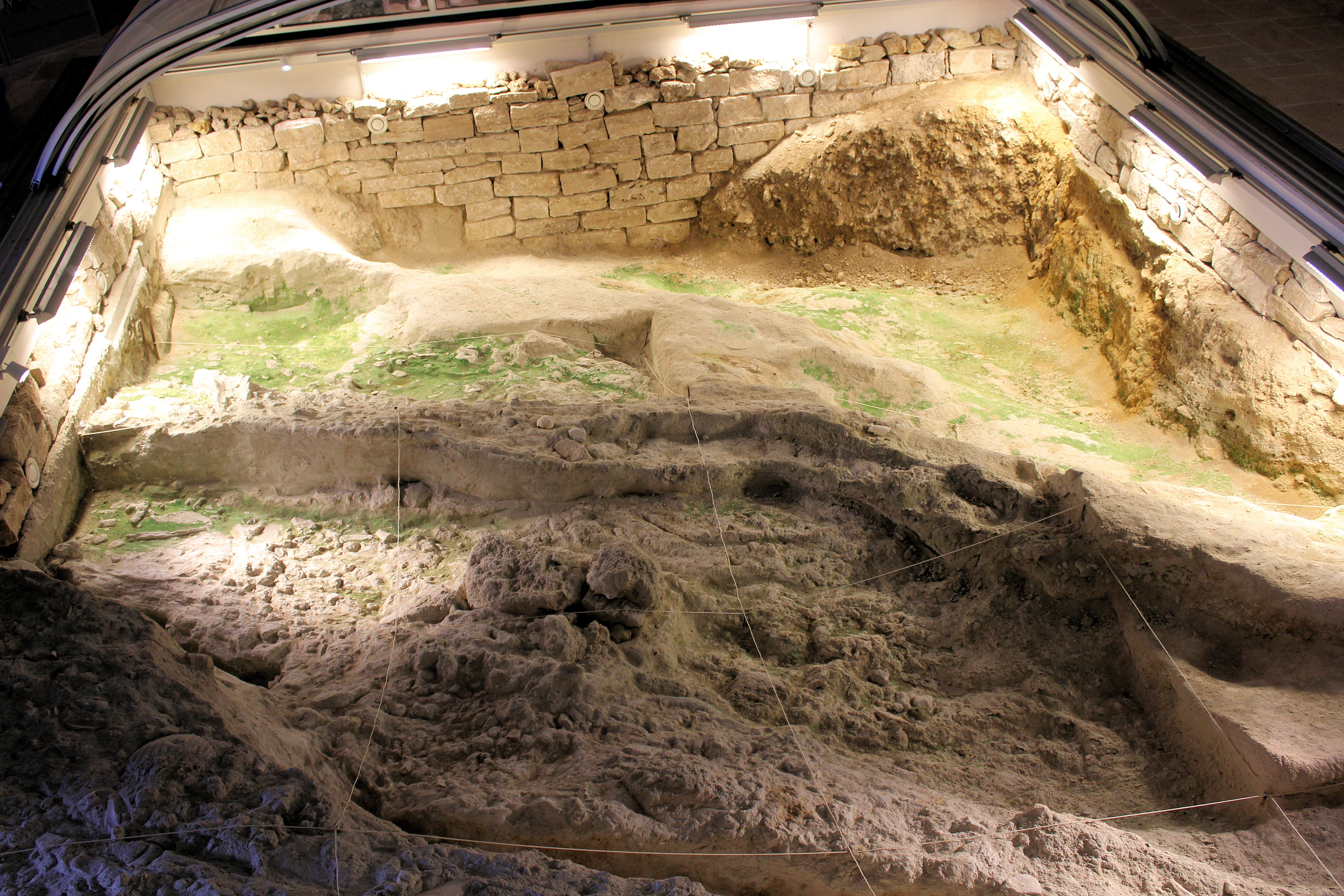
Bilzingsleben, possibly built by Homo heidelbergensis, 400–350.000 BCE.

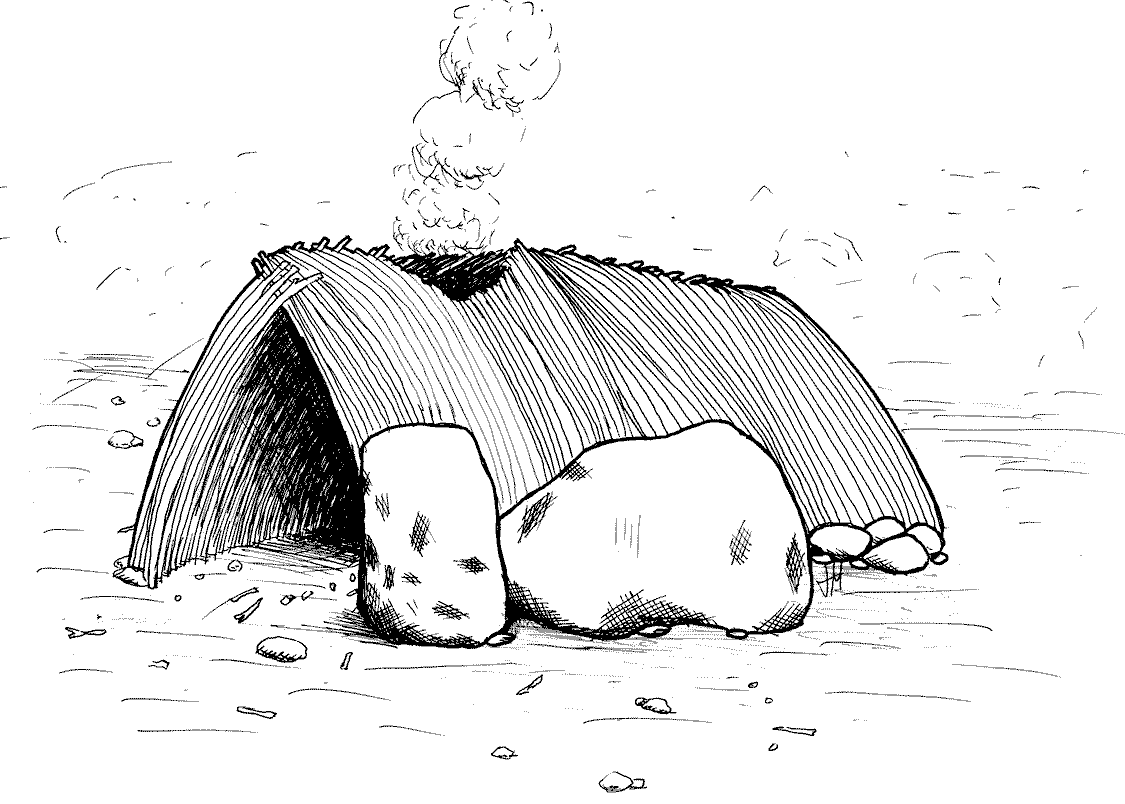
Reconstruction of a Terra Amata dwelling, possibly built by Homo heidelbergensis, 380–230,000 BCE.

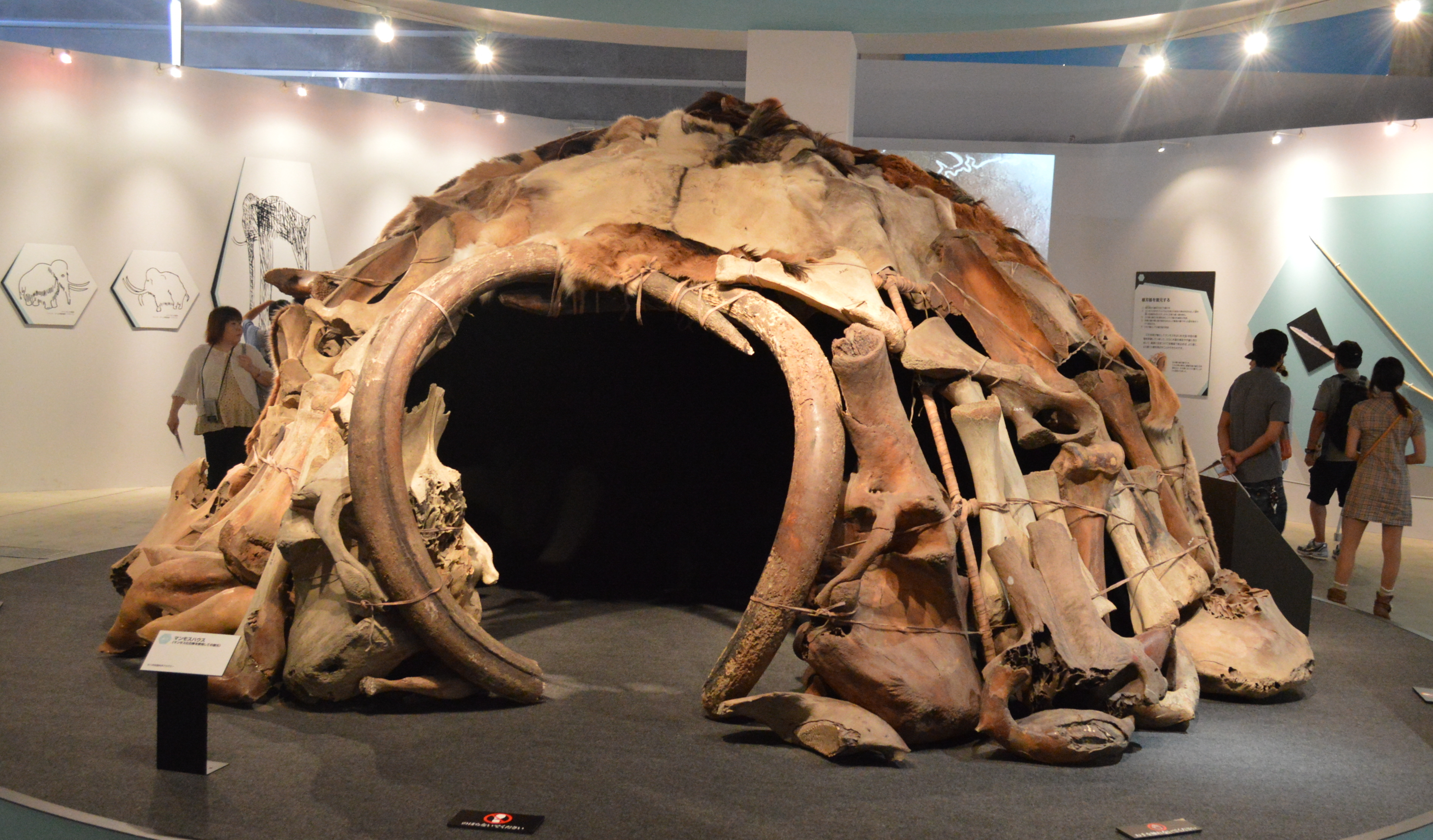
A mammoth bone dwelling like those constructed at Mezhirich 15,000 years ago

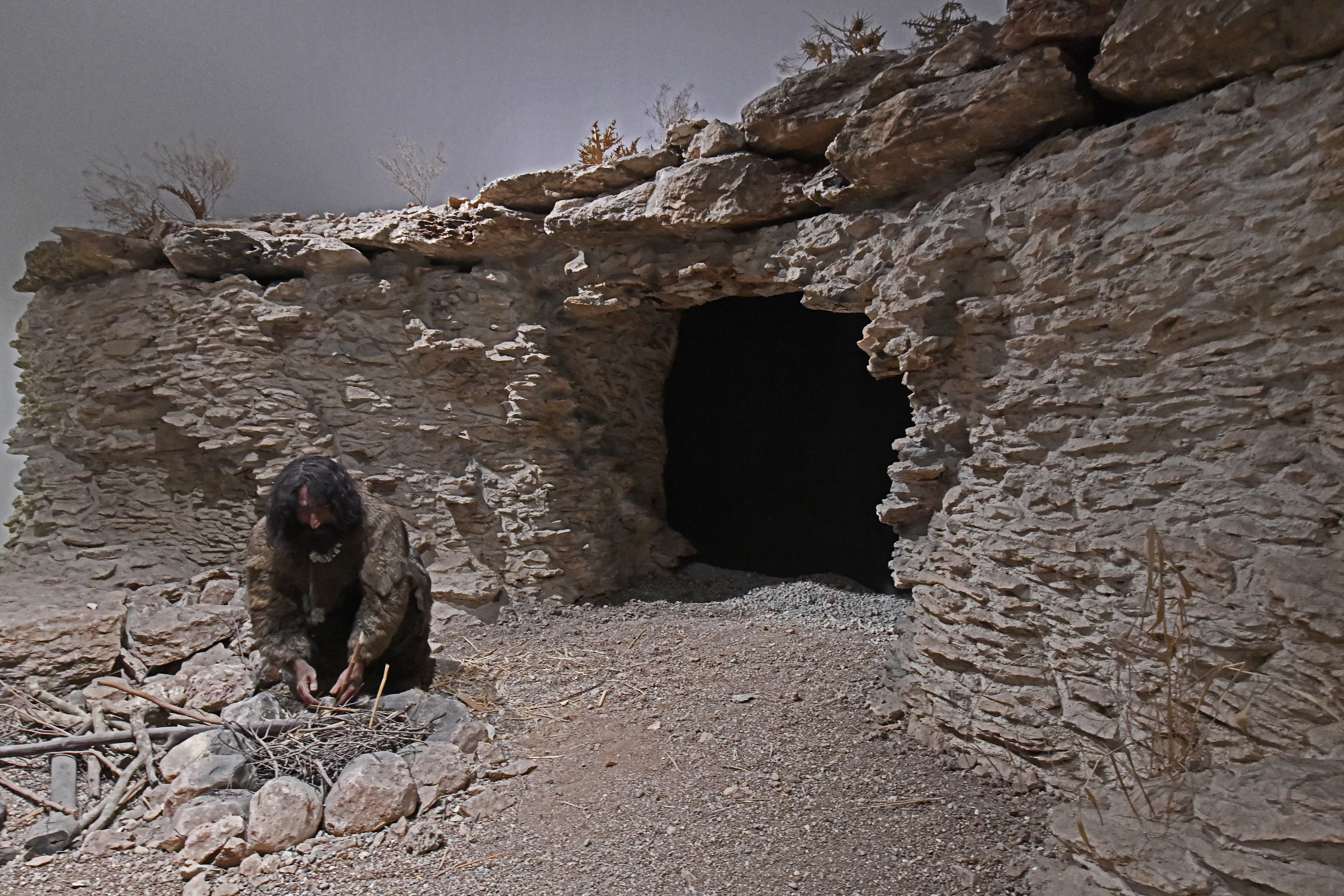
Museum expositon of a palaeolithic shelter, technology and culture

== 10,000–2000 BC ==
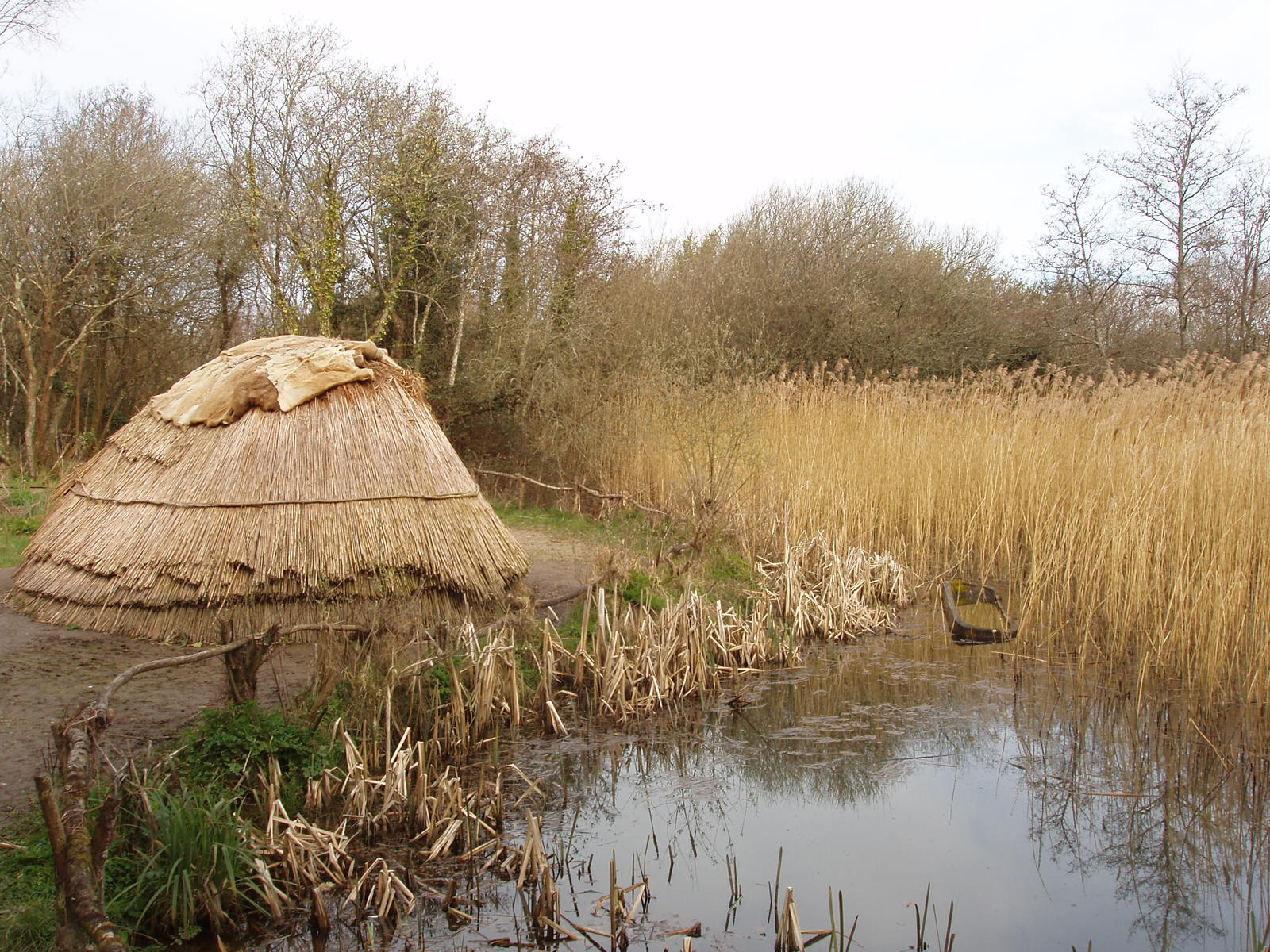
Reconstruction of a Mesolithic house in Ireland, Irish National Heritage Park

Architectural advances are an important part of the Neolithic period (10,000-2000 BC), during which some of the major innovations of human history occurred. The domestication of plants and animals, for example, led to both new economics and a new relationship between people and the world, an increase in community size and permanence, a massive development of material culture and new social and ritual solutions to enable people to live together in these communities. New styles of individual structures and their combination into settlements provided the buildings required for the new lifestyle and economy, and were also an essential element of change.

Although many dwellings belonging to all prehistoric periods and also some clay models of dwellings have been uncovered enabling the creation of faithful reconstructions, they seldom included elements that may relate them to art. Some exceptions are provided by wall decorations and by finds that equally apply to Neolithic and Chalcolithic rites and art.

In South and Southwest Asia, Neolithic cultures appear soon after 10,000 BC, initially in the Levant (Pre-Pottery Neolithic A and Pre-Pottery Neolithic B) and from there spread eastwards and westwards. There are early Neolithic cultures in Southeast Anatolia, Syria and Iraq by 8000 BC, and food-producing societies first appear in southeast Europe by 7000 BC, and Central Europe by c. 5500 BC (of which the earliest cultural complexes include the Starčevo-Koros (Cris), Linearbandkeramic, and Vinča).

Neolithic settlements and "cities" include:

- Göbekli Tepe in Turkey, ca. 9,000 BC
- Jericho in Palestine, Neolithic from around 8,350 BC, arising from the earlier Epipaleolithic Natufian culture
- Nevali Cori in Turkey, ca. 8,000 BC
- Çatalhöyük in Turkey, 7,500 BC
- Mehrgarh in Pakistan, 7,000 BC
- Herxheim (archaeological site) in Germany, 5,300 BC
- Knap of Howar and Skara Brae, the Orkney Islands, Scotland, from 3,500 BC
- over 3,000 settlements of the Cucuteni-Trypillian culture, some with populations up to 15,000 residents, flourished in present-day Romania, Moldova and Ukraine from 5,400 to 2,800 BC.
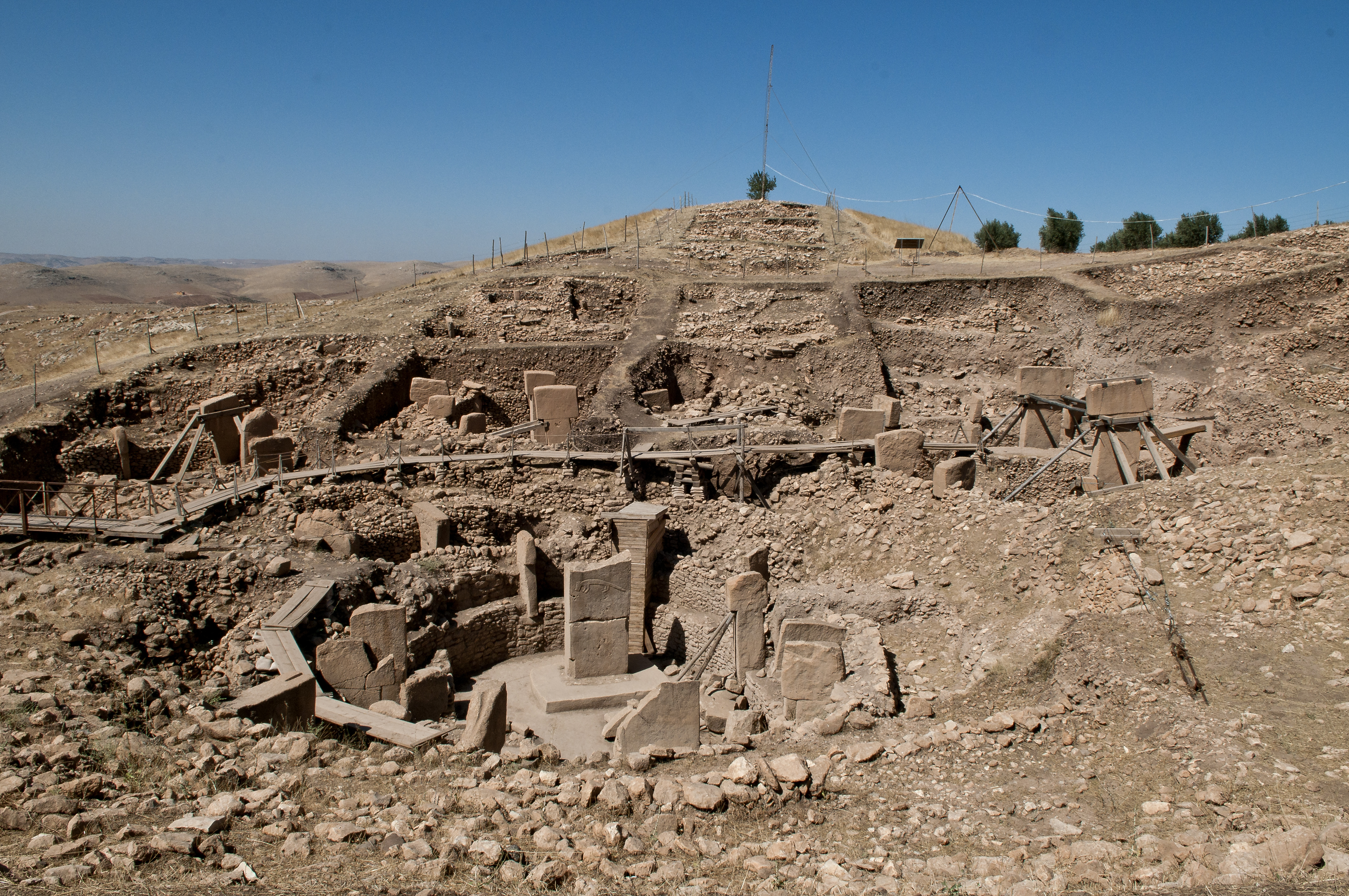
Göbekli Tepe (Turkey), c.9500-8000 BC

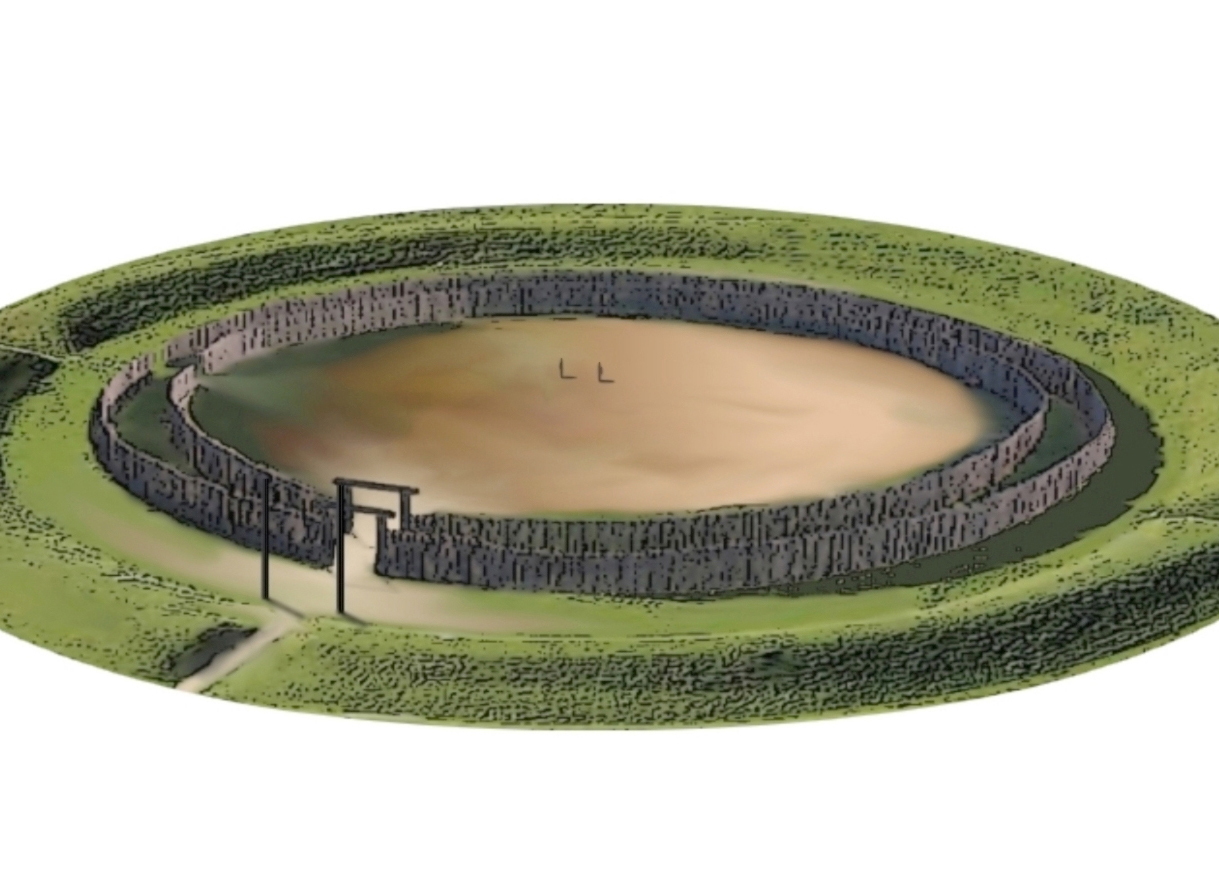
Goseck circle, Germany 4900 BC

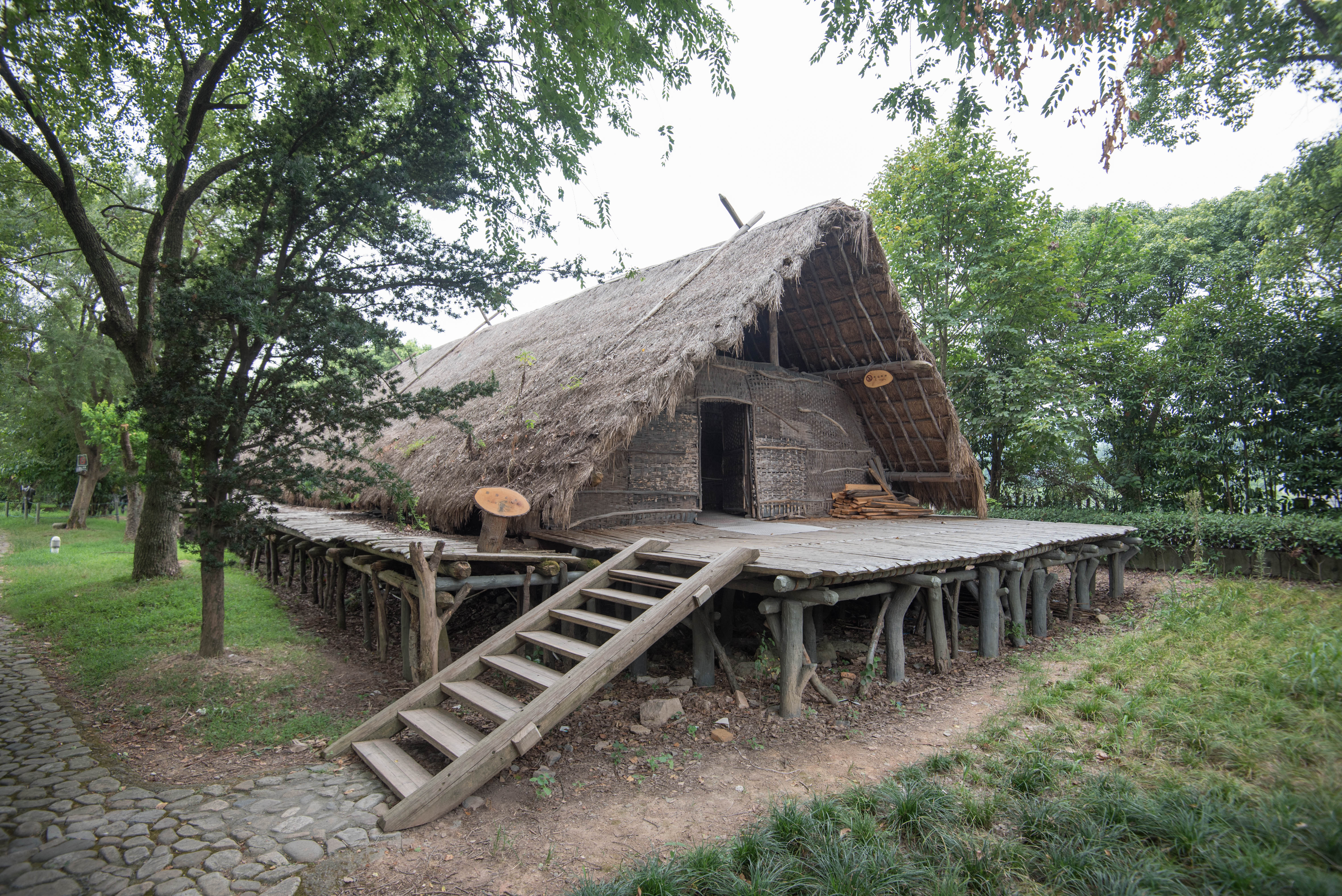
Reconstructed wooden house (Hemudu, China), 5000-4500 BC

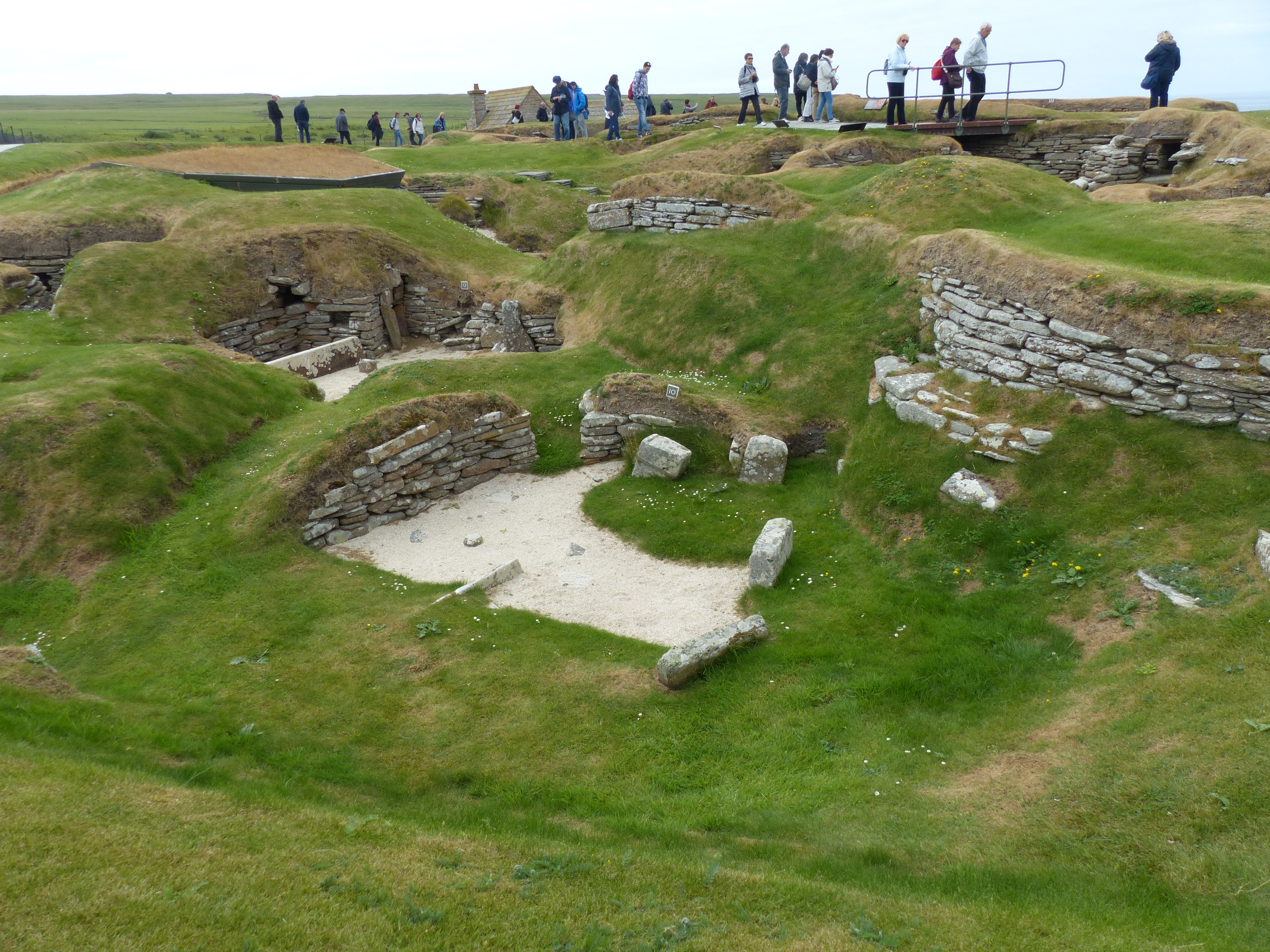
Skara Brae (Scotland), 3200-2200 BC

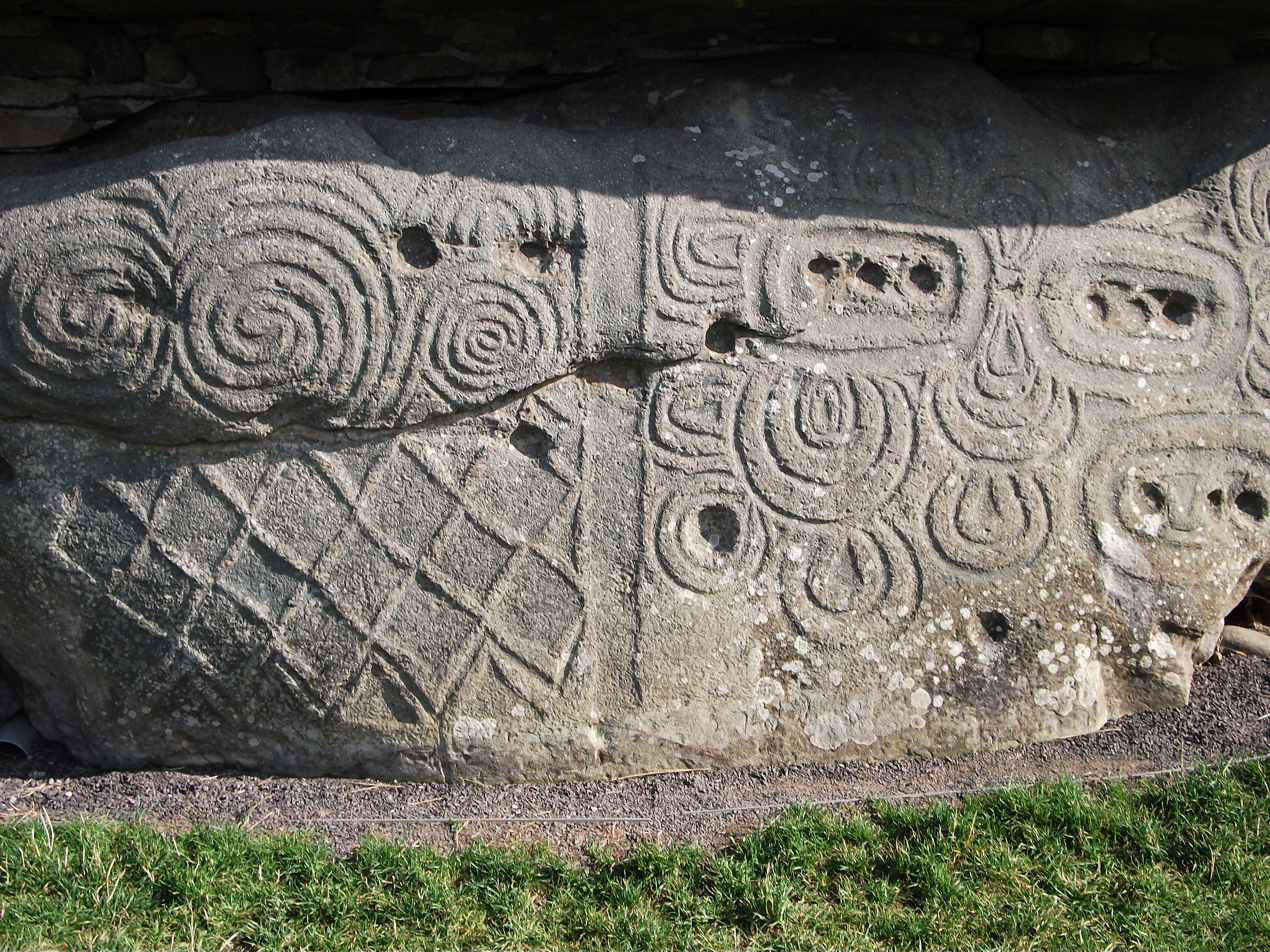
Decorated stone, Newgrange (Ireland), 3200-3100 BC

== Antiquity ==
=== Mesopotamian ===
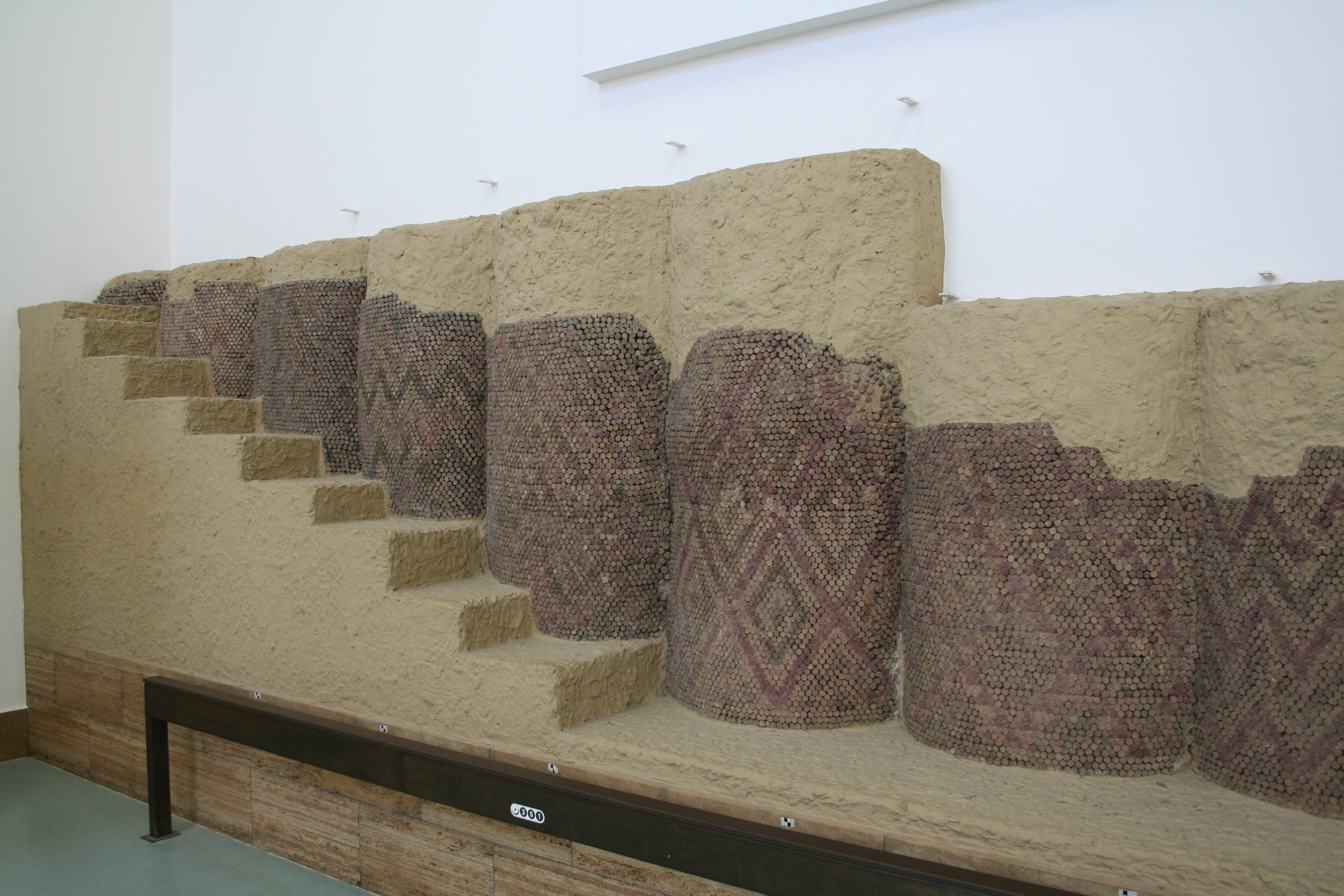
Columns with clay mosaic cones from the Eanna precinct in Uruk (southern Mesopotamia), Pergamon Museum, Berlin, Germany, unknown architect, 3600-3200 BC

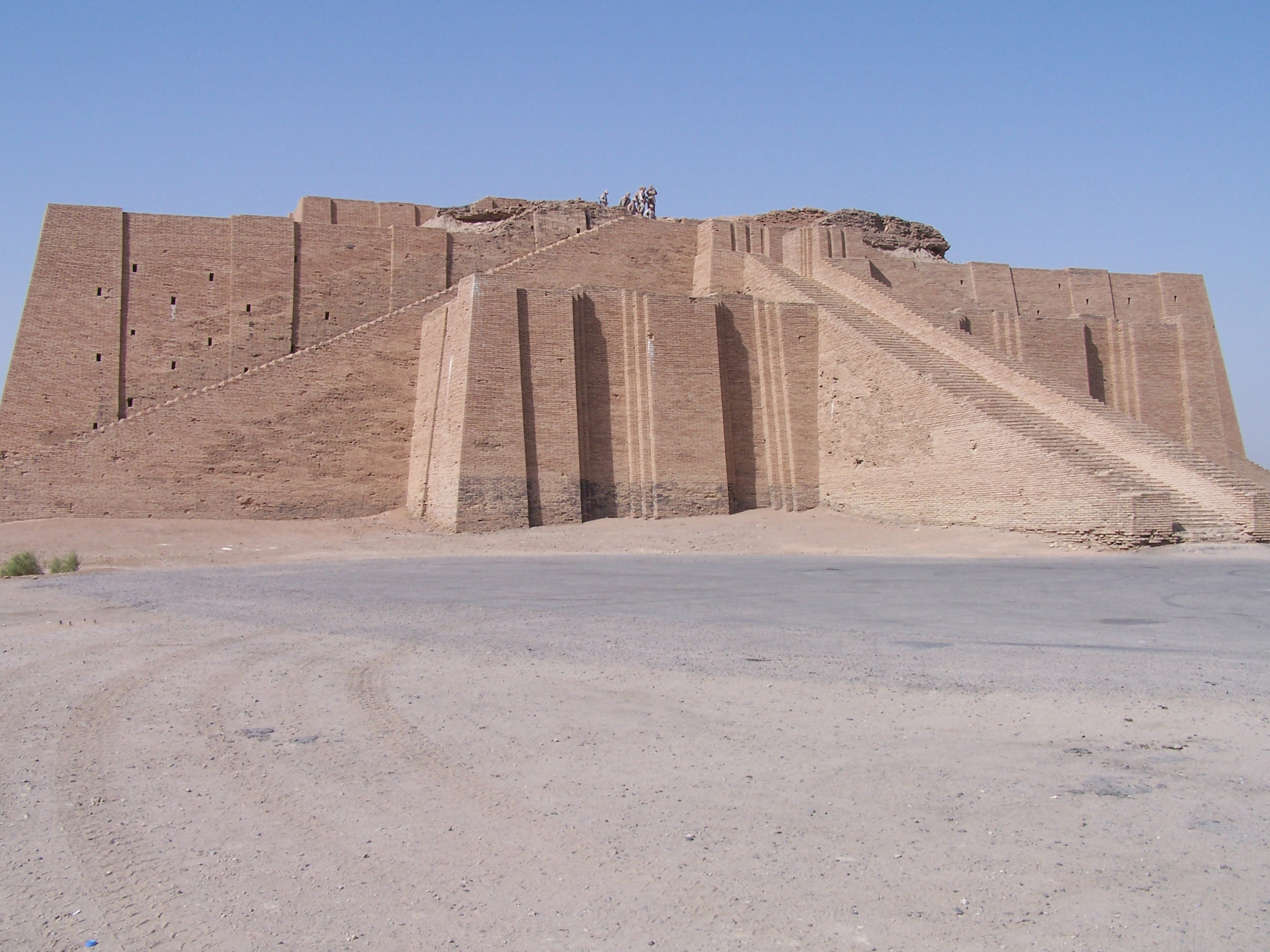
Ziggurat of Ur, Tell el-Muqayyar, Dhi Qar Province, Iraq, unknown architect, 21st century BC

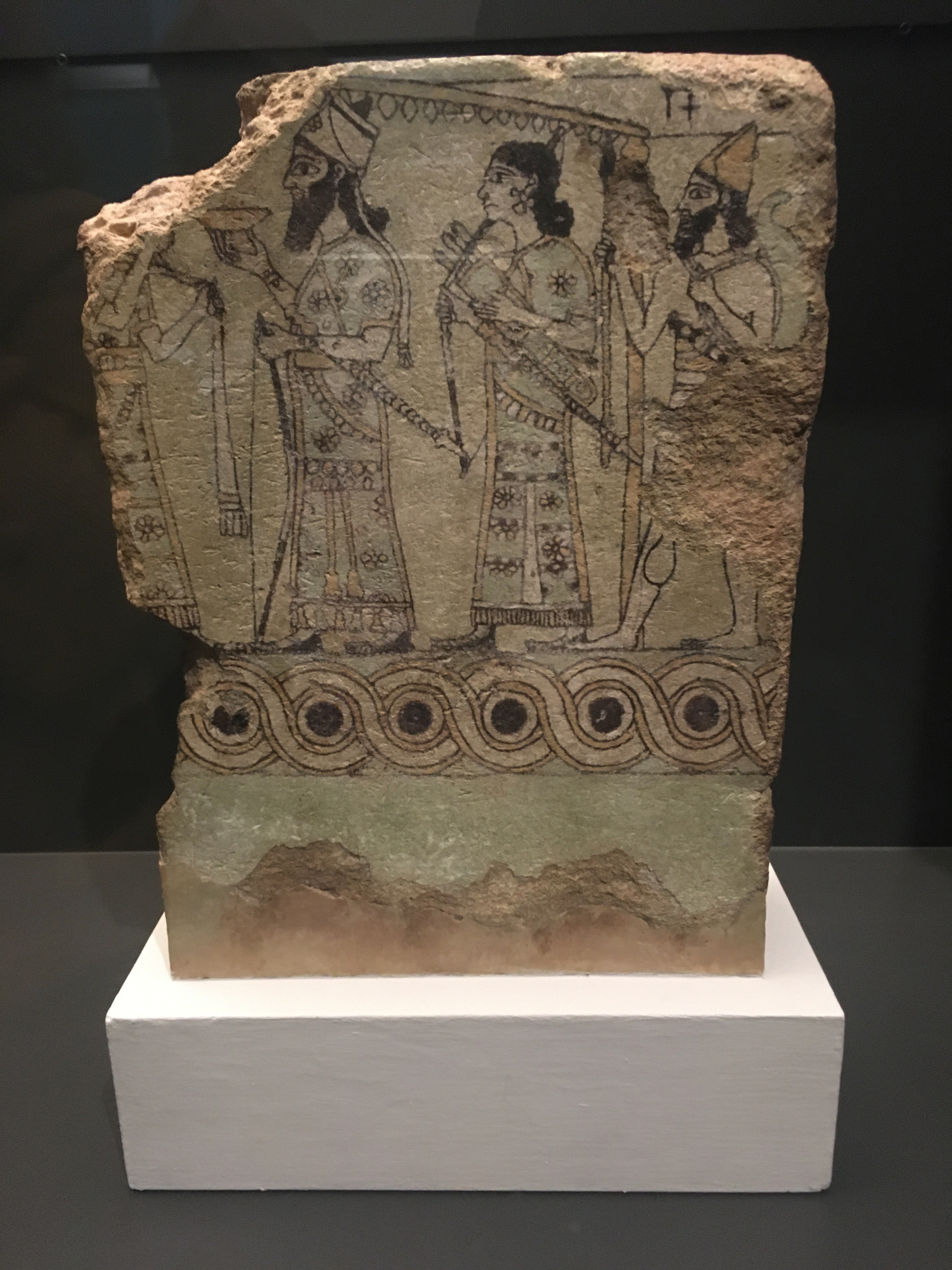
Tile with a guilloche border from the North-West Palace at Nimrud (now in modern Iraq), British Museum, London, unknown artisan, 883-859 BC

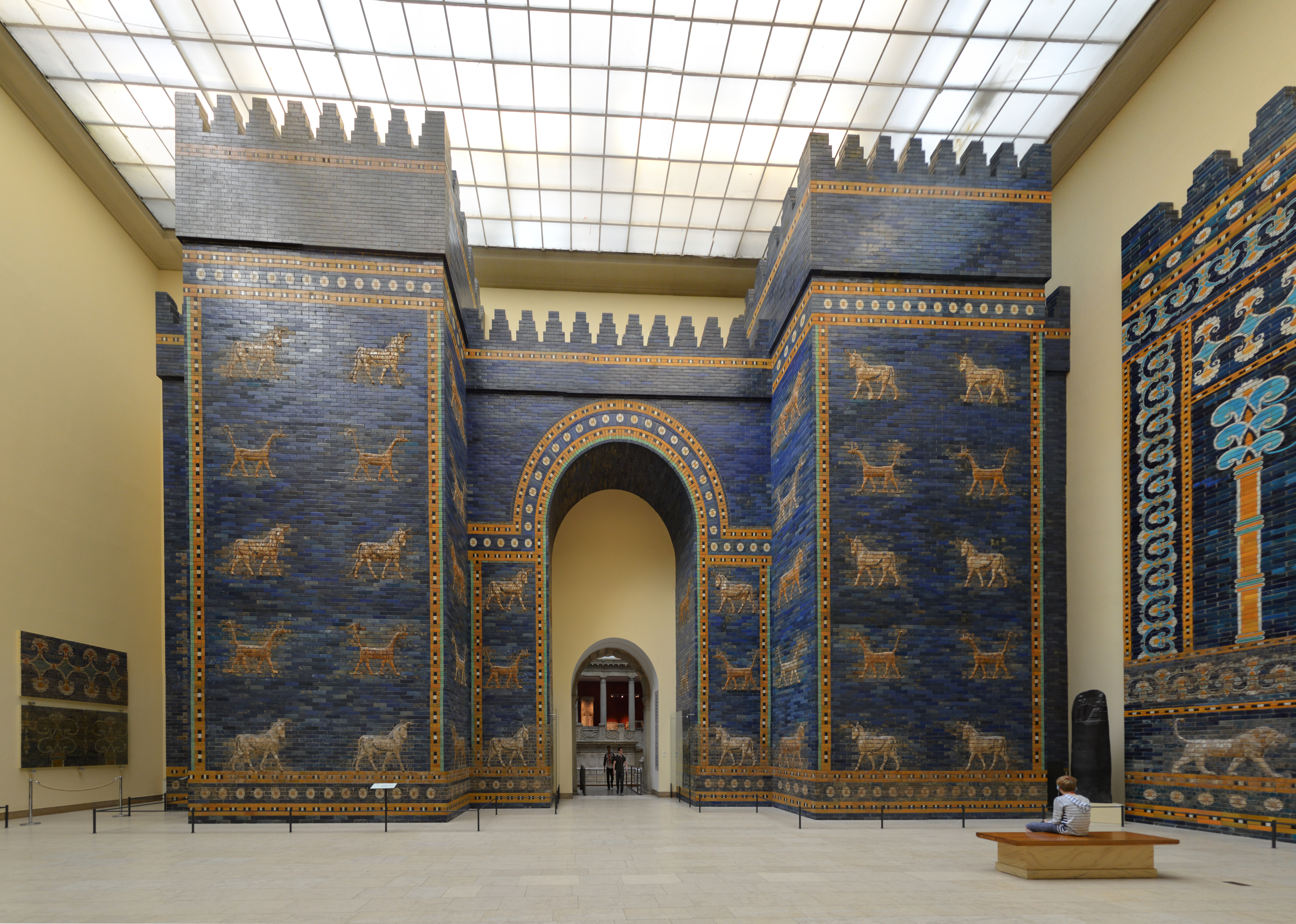
Reconstruction of the Ishtar Gate, Pergamon Museum, Berlin, Germany, unknown architect, c.605-539 BC

Assyrian palaces had a large public court with a suite of apartments on the east side and a series of large banqueting halls on the south side. This was to become the traditional plan of Assyrian palaces, built and adorned for the glorification of the king. Massive amounts of ivory furniture pieces were found in some palaces.

Mesopotamia is most noted for its construction of mud-brick buildings and the construction of ziggurats, occupying a prominent place in each city and consisting of an artificial mound, often rising in huge steps, surmounted by a temple. The mound was no doubt to elevate the temple to a commanding position in what was otherwise a flat river valley. The great city of Uruk had a number of religious precincts, containing many temples larger and more ambitious than any buildings previously known.

The word ziggurat is an anglicized form of the Akkadian word ziqqurratum, the name given to the solid stepped towers of mud brick. It derives from the verb zaqaru, ("to be high"). The buildings are described as being like mountains linking Earth and heaven. The Ziggurat of Ur, excavated by Leonard Woolley, is 64 by 46 meters at base and originally some 12 meters in height with three stories. It was built under Ur-Nammu (circa 2100 BC) and rebuilt under Nabonidus (555–539 BC), when it was increased in height to probably seven stories.

=== Ancient Egyptian ===
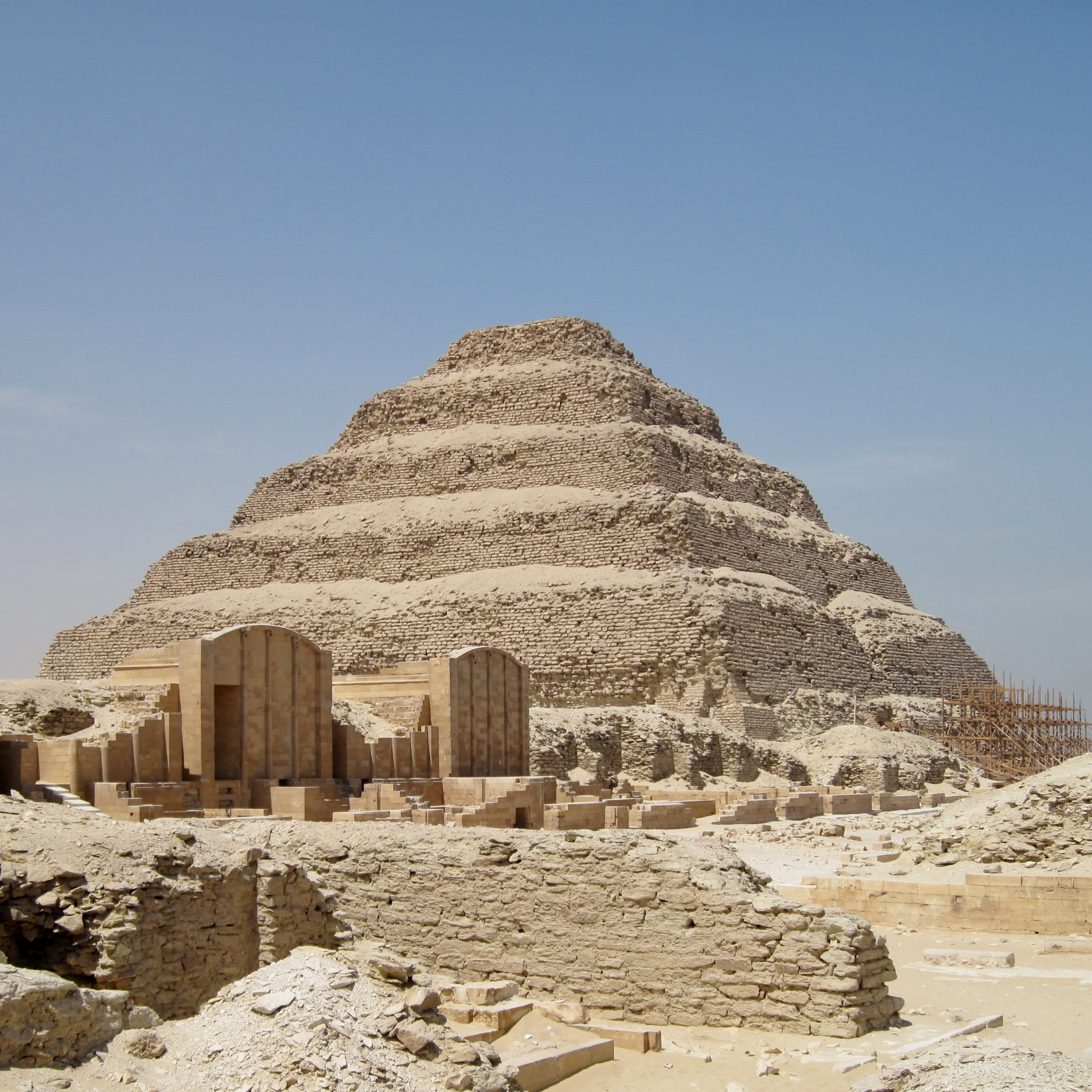
The Pyramid of Djoser, Saqqara, Egypt, by Imhotep, 2667–2648 BC

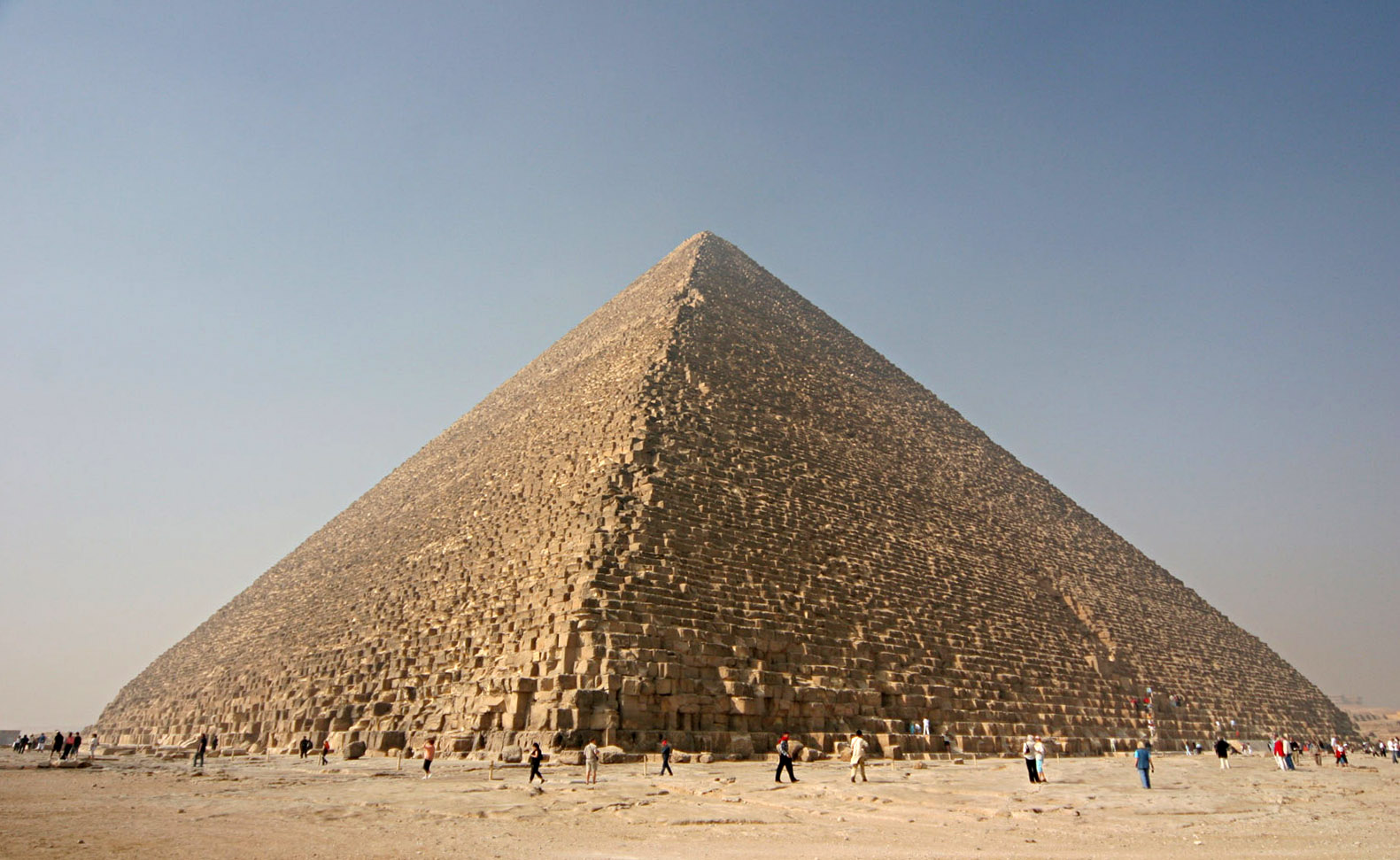
Great Pyramid of Giza, Giza, Egypt, by Hemiunu, c.2589-2566 BC

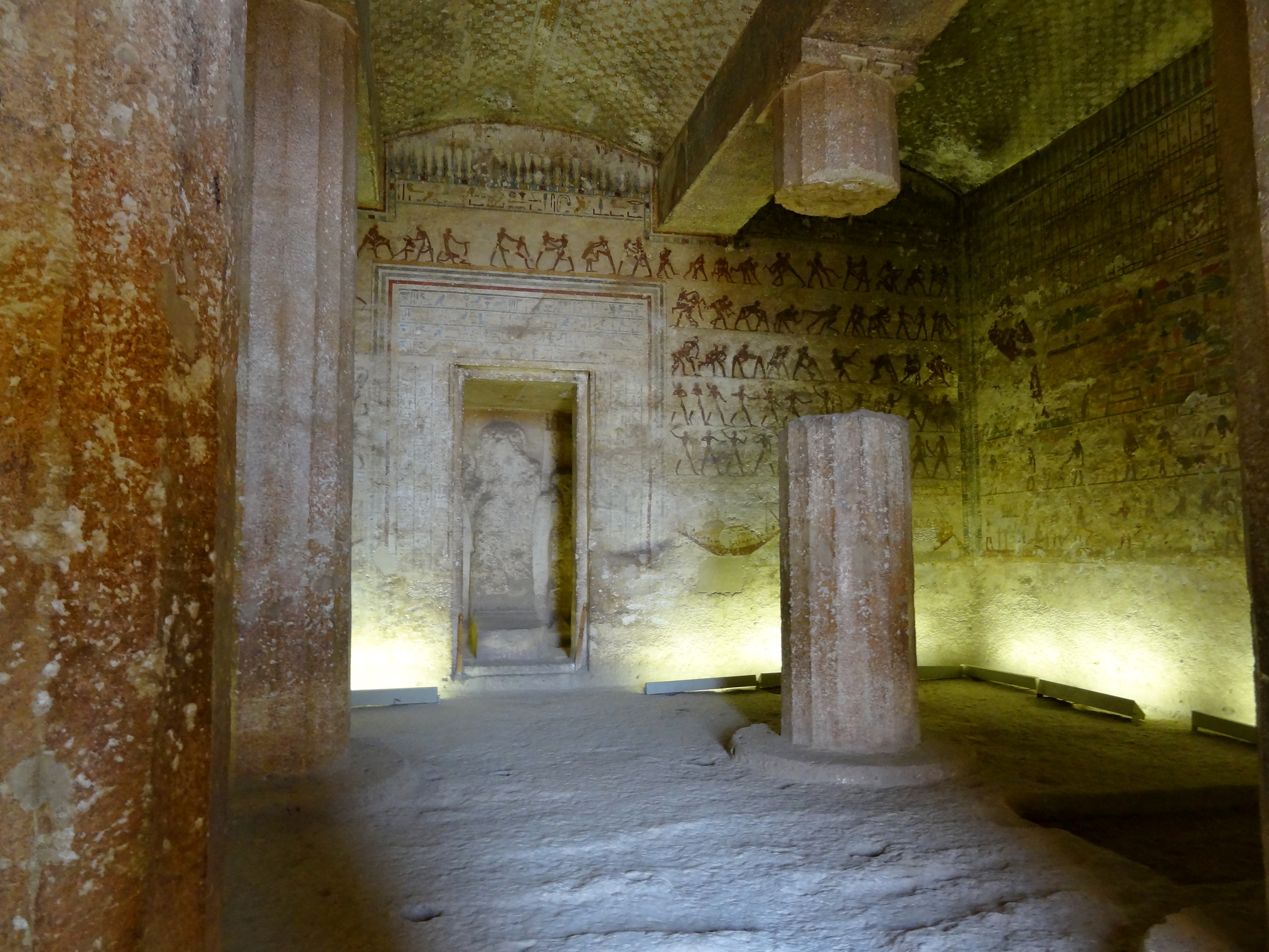
Interior hall of the rock-cut tomb of Amenemhat, Tomb 2 (BH2), Beni Hasan, Egypt, unknown architect, c.1900 BC

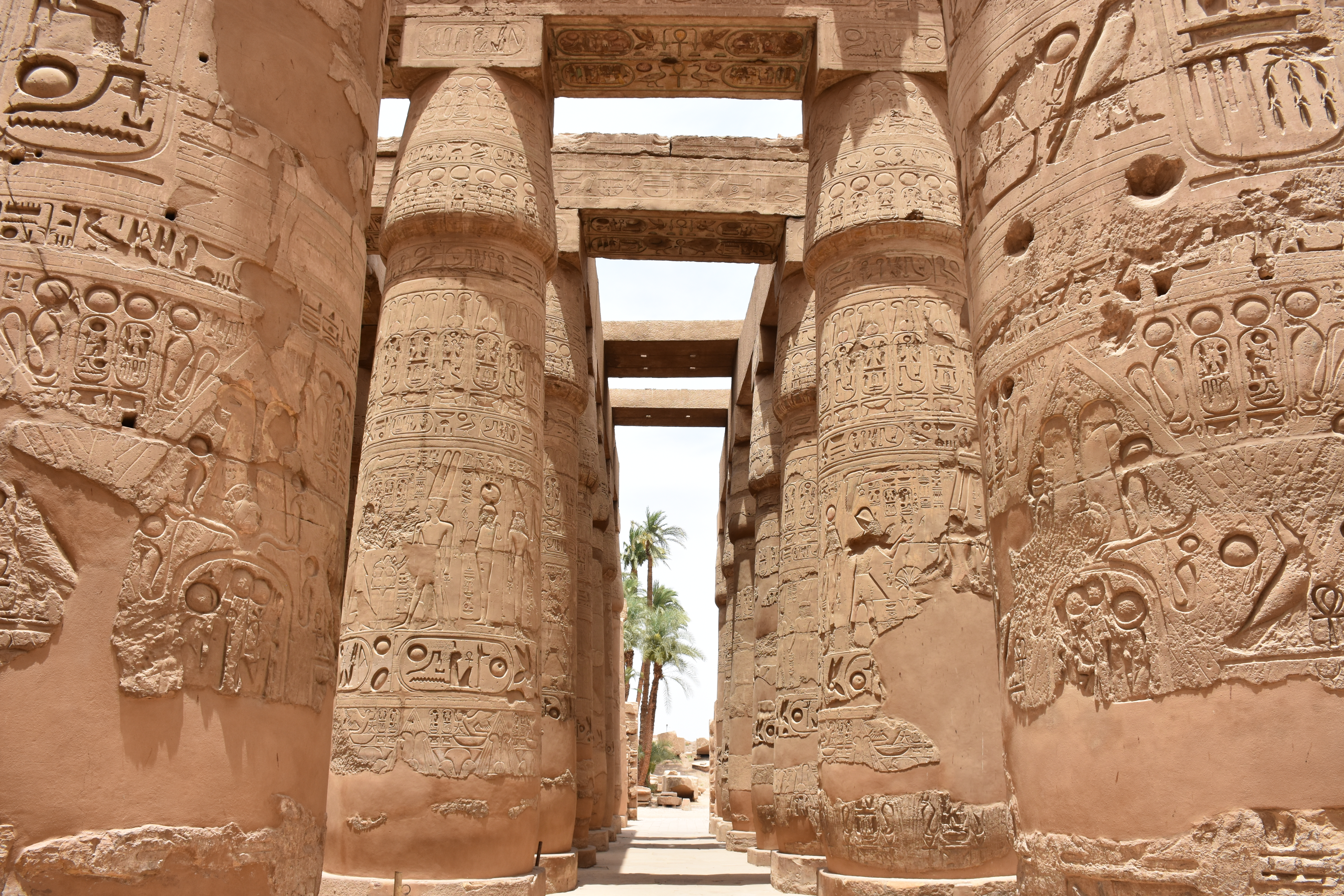
Hypostyle Hall of the Karnak Temple Complex, Luxor, Egypt, unknown architect, c.1294–1213 BC

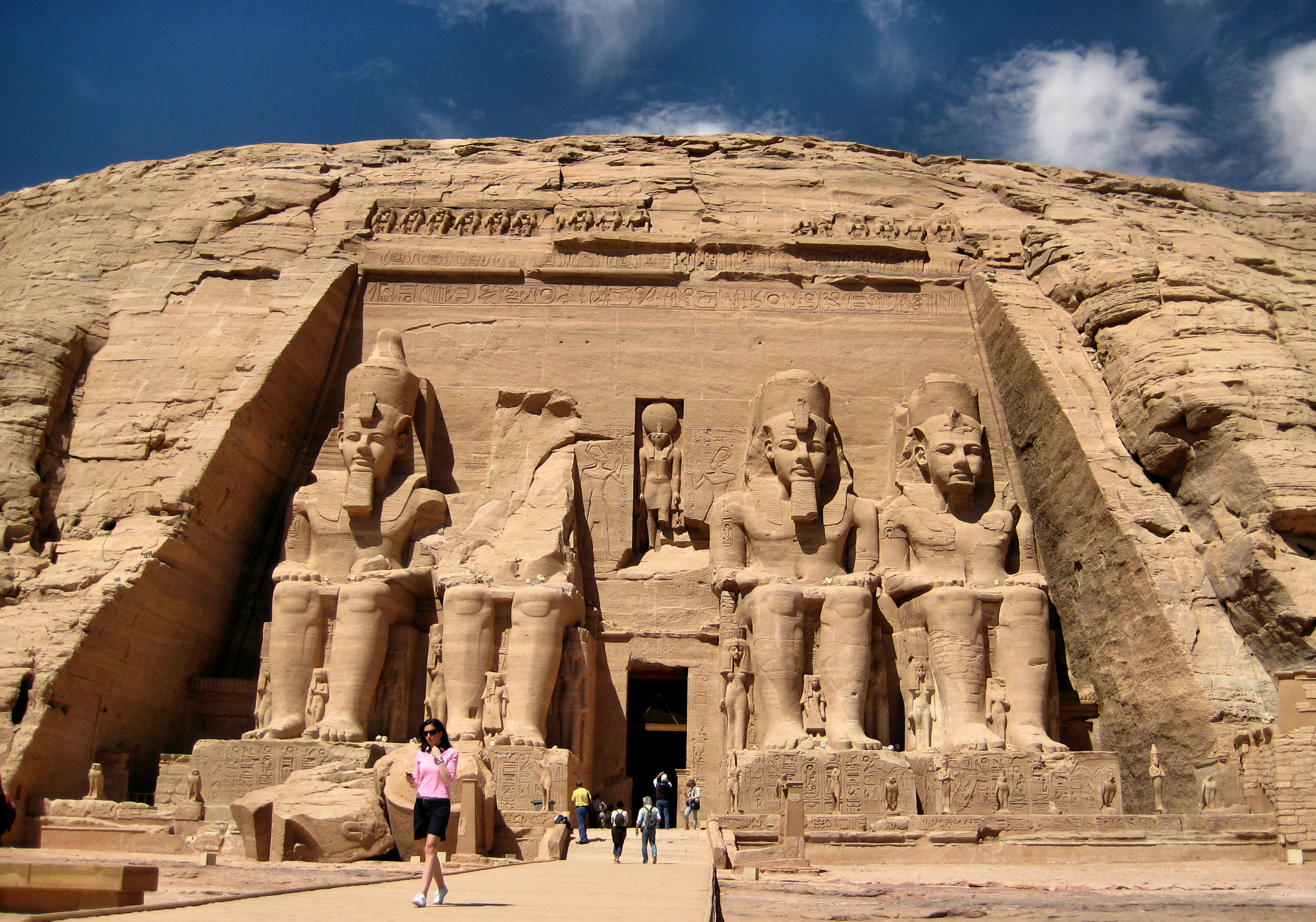
Great Temple of Abu Simbel, Egypt, unknown architect, c.1264 BC

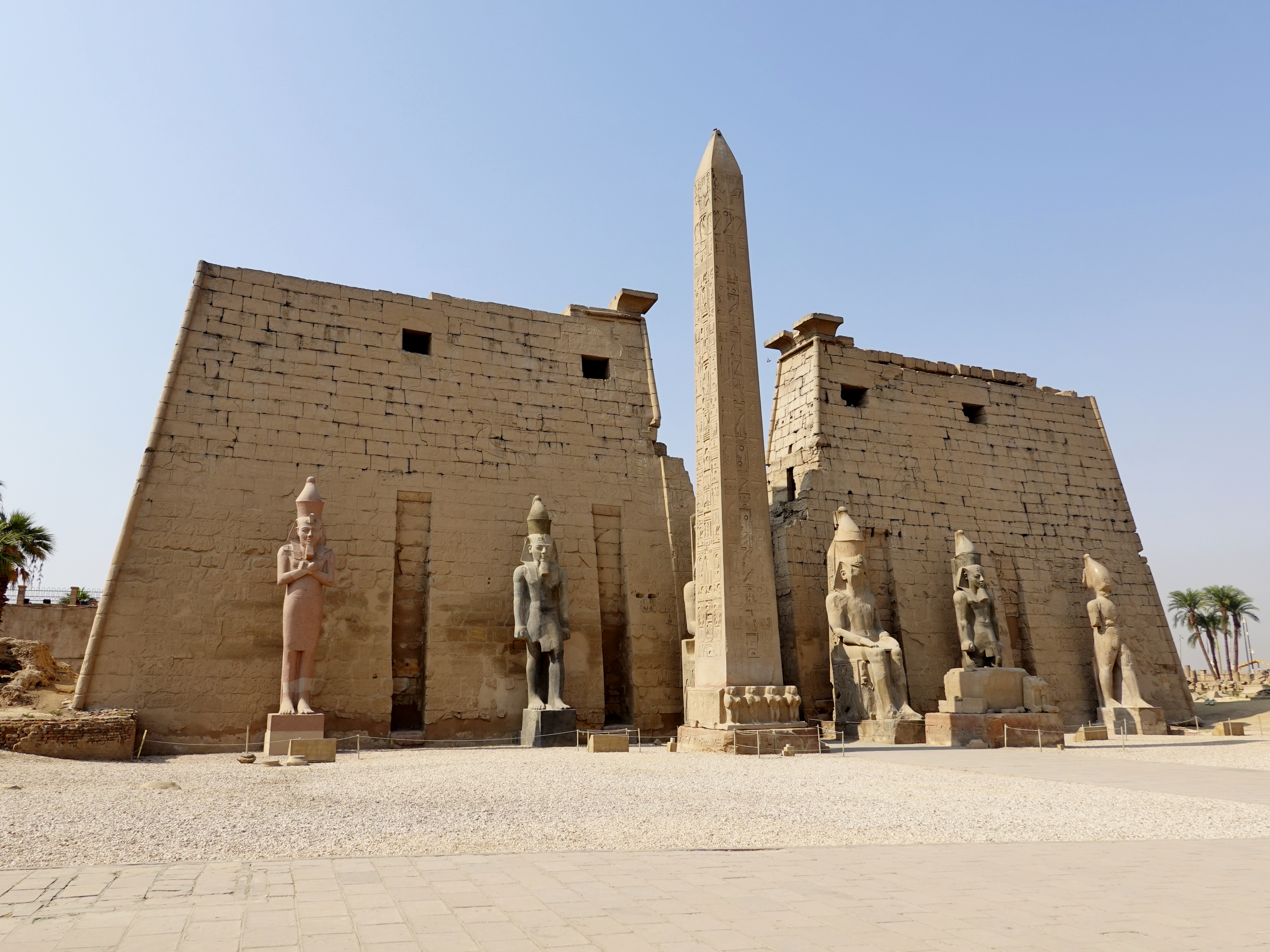
Entrance of the Luxor Temple complex, unknown architect, 1279-1212 BC

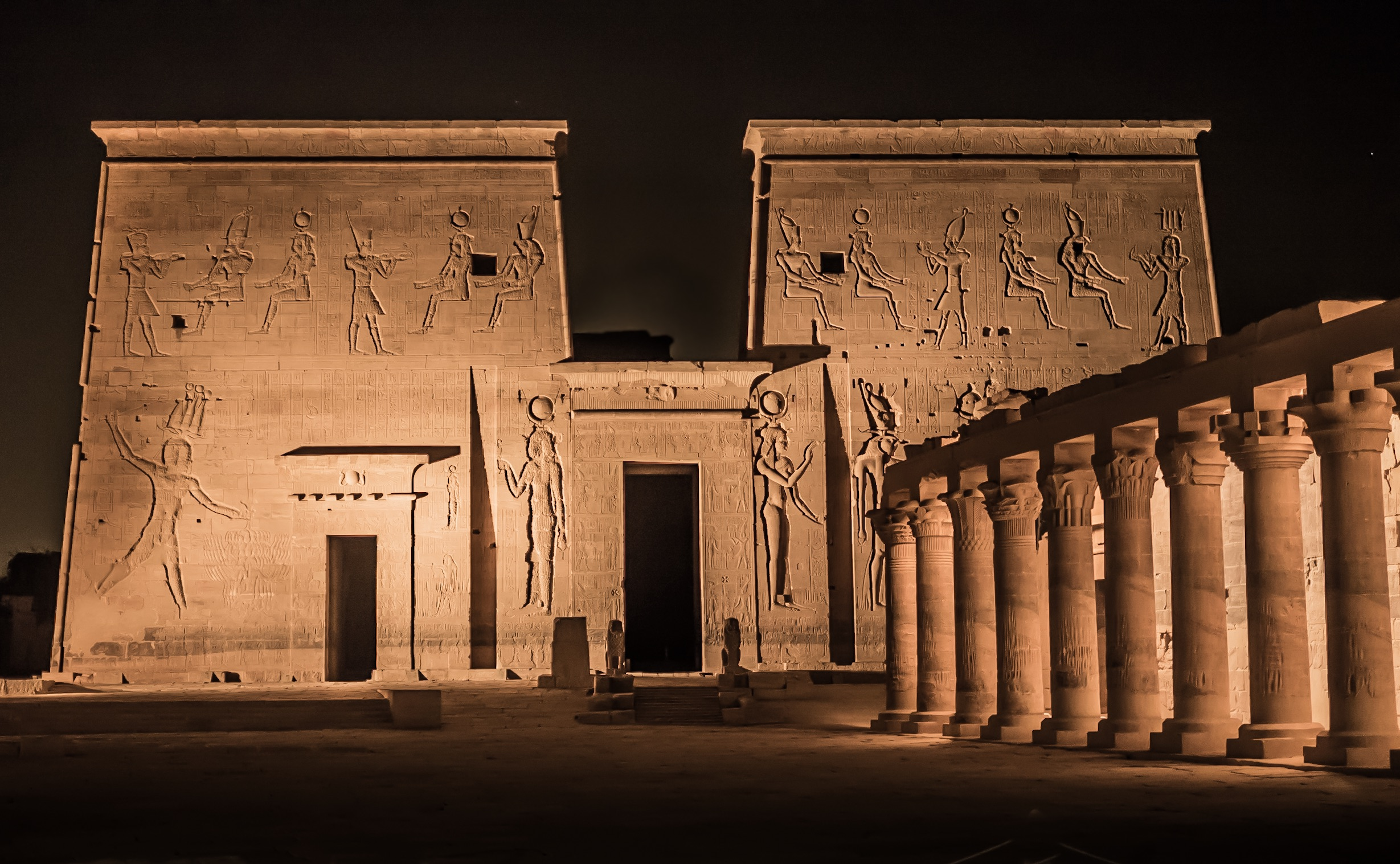
Temple of Philae, unknown architect, 380 BC–117 AD

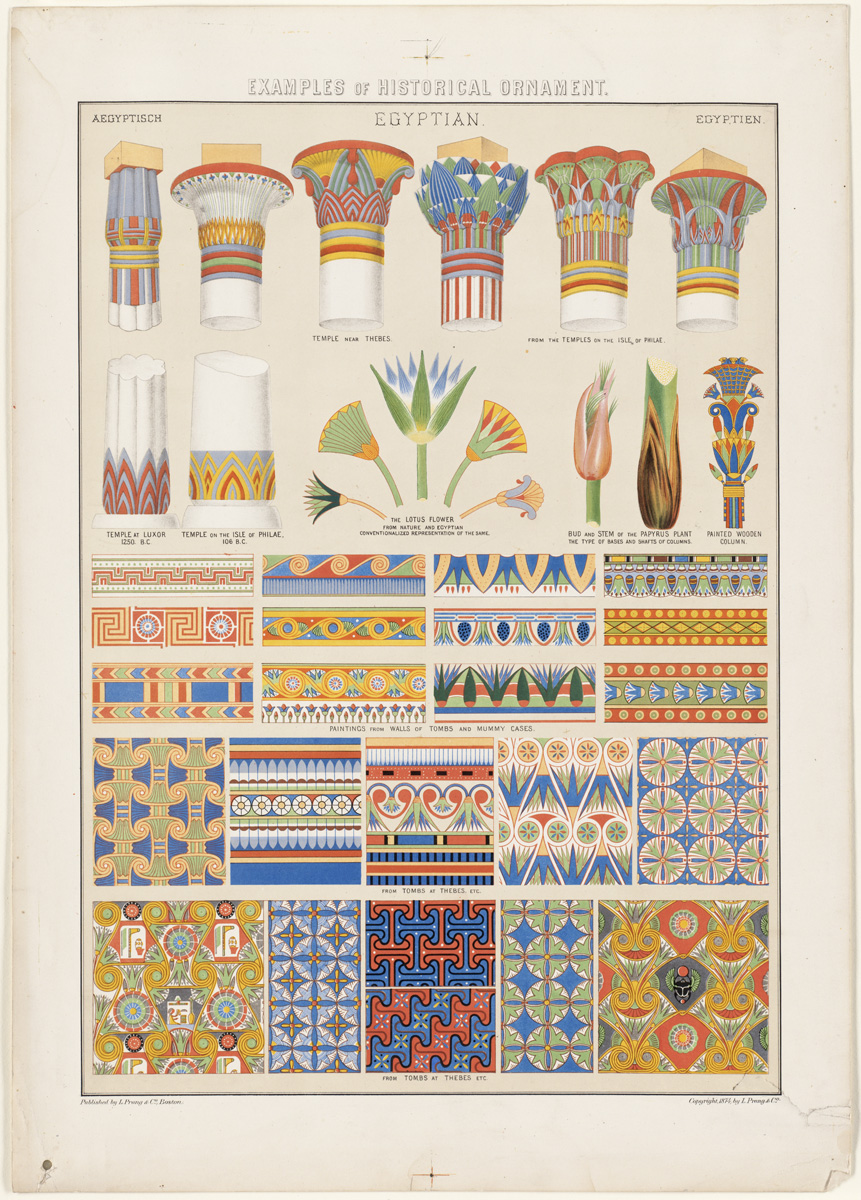
Illustrations from 1874 of ornaments and patterns used by ancient Egyptians

Modern imaginings of ancient Egypt are heavily influenced by the surviving traces of monumental architecture. Many formal styles and motifs were established at the dawn of the pharaonic state, around 3100 BC. The most iconic Ancient Egyptian buildings are the pyramids, built during the Old and Middle Kingdoms (c.2600–1800 BC) as tombs for the pharaoh. However, there are also impressive temples, like the Karnak Temple Complex.

The Ancient Egyptians believed in the afterlife. They also believed that in order for their soul (known as ka) to live eternally in their afterlife, their bodies would have to remain intact for eternity. So, they had to create a way to protect the deceased from damage and grave robbers. This way, the mastaba was born. These were adobe structures with flat roofs, which had underground rooms for the coffin, about 30 m down. Imhotep, an ancient Egyptian priest and architect, had to design a tomb for the Pharaoh Djoser. For this, he placed five mastabas, one above the next, this way creating the first Egyptian pyramid, the Pyramid of Djoser at Saqqara (c.2667–2648 BC), which is a step pyramid. The first smooth-sided one was built by Pharaoh Sneferu, who ruled between c.2613 and 2589 BC. The most imposing one is the Great Pyramid of Giza, made for Sneferu's son: Khufu (c.2589–2566 BC), being the last surviving wonder of the ancient world and the largest pyramid in Egypt. The stone blocks used for pyramids were held together by mortar, and the entire structure was covered with highly polished white limestone, with their tops topped in gold. What we see today is actually the core structure of the pyramid. Inside, narrow passages led to the royal burial chambers. Despite being highly associated with the Ancient Egypt, pyramids have been built by other civilisations too, like the Mayans.

Due to the lack of resources and a shift in power towards priesthood, ancient Egyptians stepped away from pyramids, and temples became the focal point of cult construction. Just like the pyramids, Ancient Egyptian temples were also spectacular and monumental. They evolved from small shrines made of perishable materials to large complexes, and by the New Kingdom (circa 1550–1070 BC) they have become massive stone structures consisting of halls and courtyards. The temple represented a sort of 'cosmos' in stone, a copy of the original mound of creation on which the god could rejuvenate himself and the world. The entrance consisted of a twin gateway (pylon), symbolizing the hills of the horizon. Inside there were columned halls symbolizing a primeval papyrus thicket. It was followed by a series of hallways of decreasing size, until the sanctuary was reached, where a god's cult statue was placed. Back in ancient times, temples were painted in bright colours, mainly red, blue, yellow, green, orange, and white. Because of the desert climate of Egypt, some parts of these painted surfaces were preserved well, especially in interiors.

An architectural element specific to ancient Egyptian architecture is the cavetto cornice (a concave moulding), introduced by the end of the Old Kingdom. It was widely used to accentuate the top of almost every formal pharaonic building. Because of how often it was used, it will later decorate many Egyptian Revival buildings and objects.

=== Harappan ===
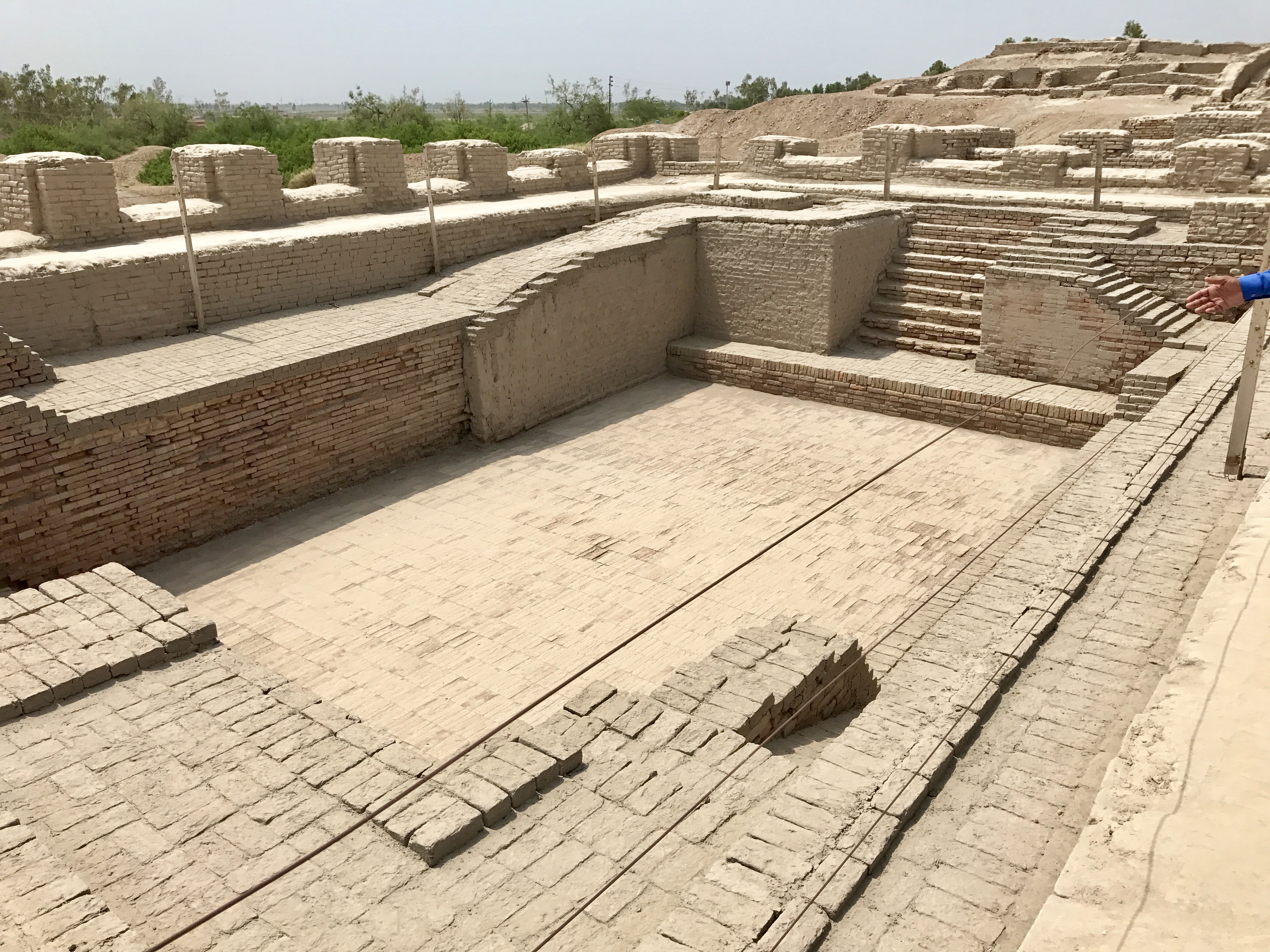
The Great Bath, in the raised citadel area of the city, Mohenjo Daro, Sindh Province, Pakistan, unknown architect, c.2600-1900 BC

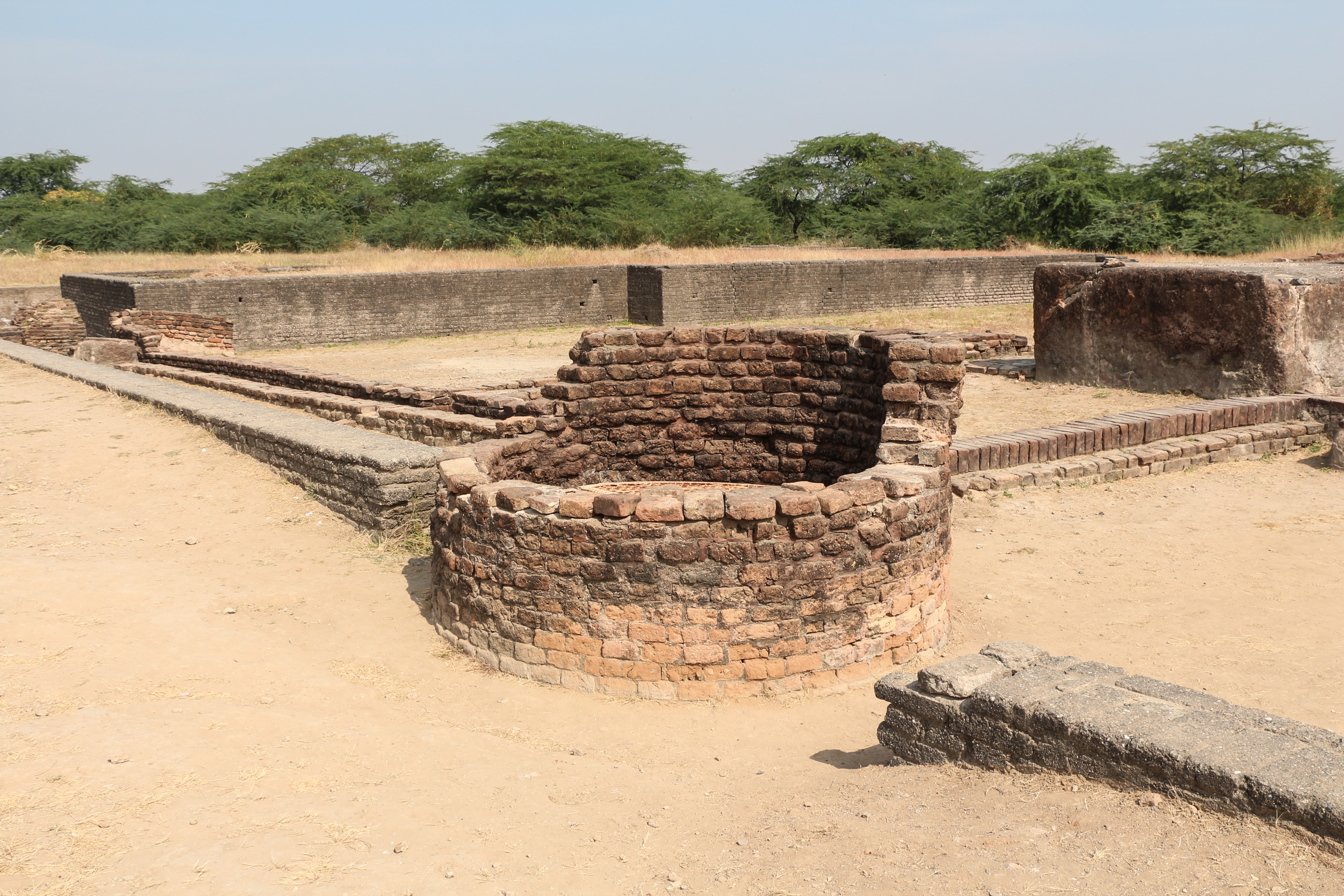
An ancient well and drainage canals at Lothal, Gujarat, India, unknown architect, c.2300 BC onward

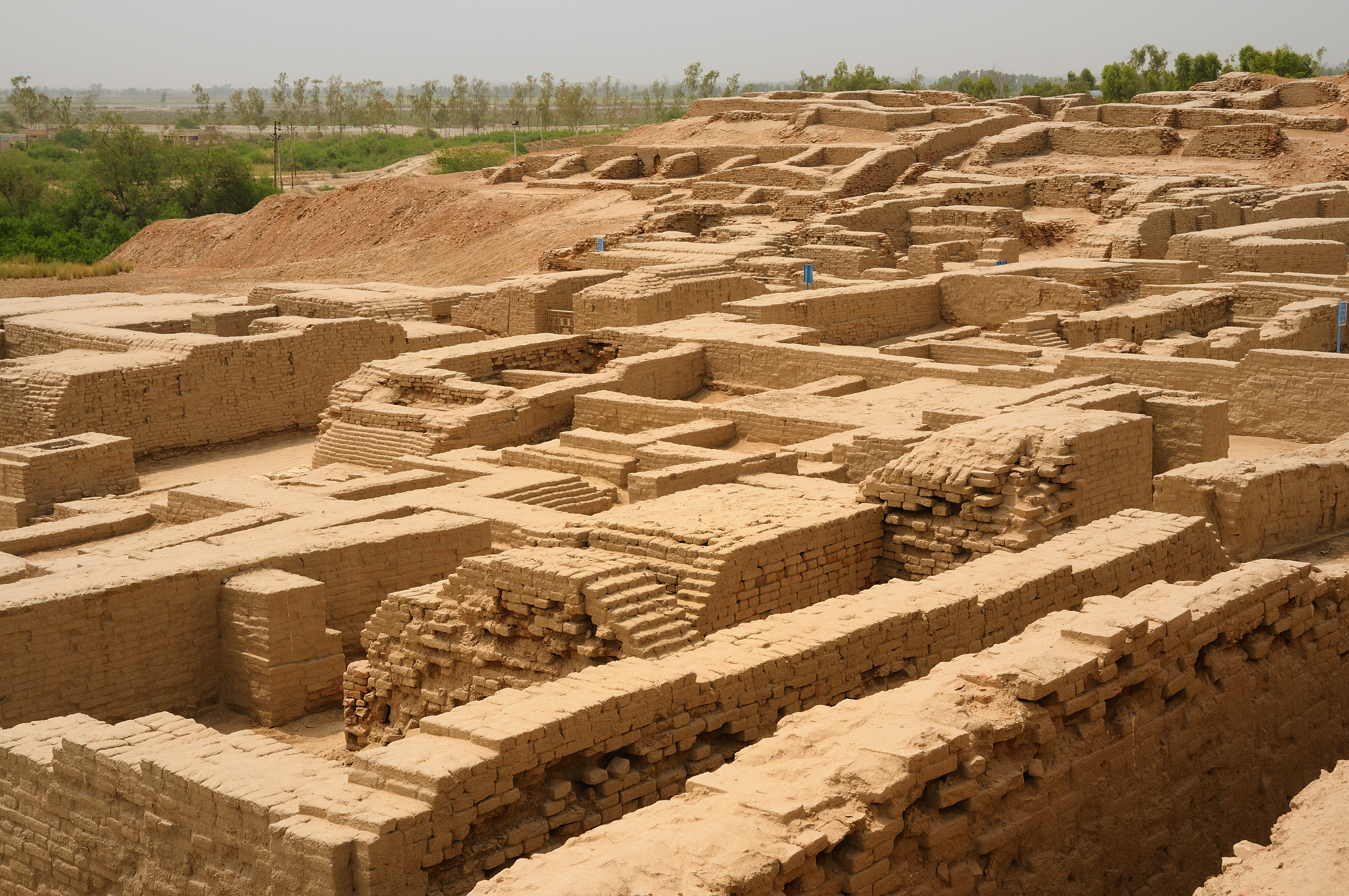
View of Mohenjo Daro, showing the walls and main streets of the city, unknown architect, c.2600-1900 BC

The first Urban Civilization in the Indian subcontinent is traceable originally to the Indus Valley civilisation mainly in Mohenjodaro and Harappa, now in modern-day Pakistan as well western states of the Republic of India. The earliest settlements are seen during the Neolithic period in Merhgarh, Balochistan. The civilization's cities were noted for their urban planning with baked brick buildings, elaborate drainage and water systems, and handicraft (carnelian products, seal carving). This civilisation transitioned from the Neolithic period into the Chalcolithic period and beyond with their expertise in metallurgy (copper, bronze, lead, and tin). Their urban centres possibly grew to contain between 30,000 and 60,000 individuals, and the civilisation itself may have contained between one and five million individuals.

=== Greek ===
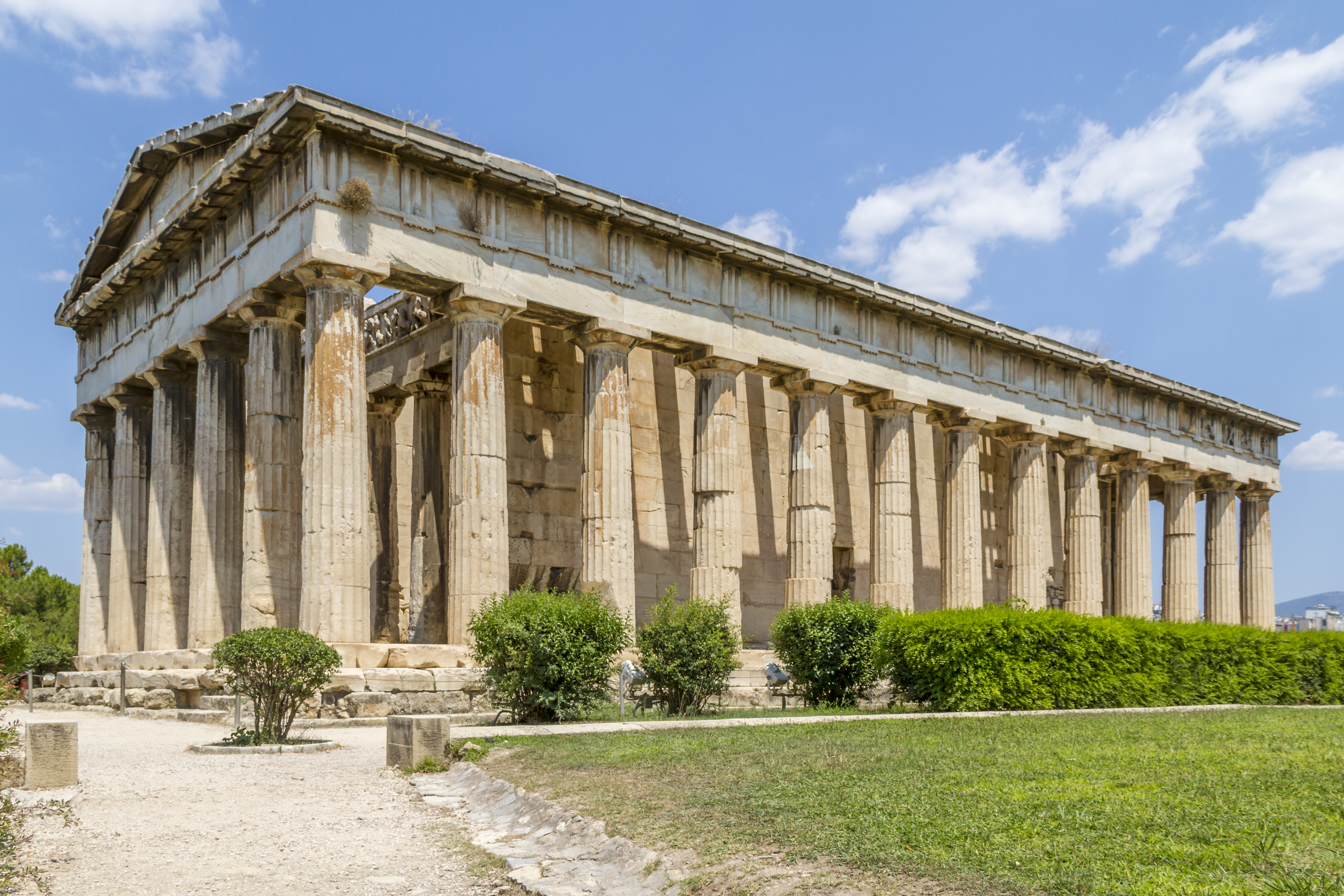
Temple of Hephaestus on the Agoraios Kolonos Hill, Athens, Greece, c.449 BC, unknown architect

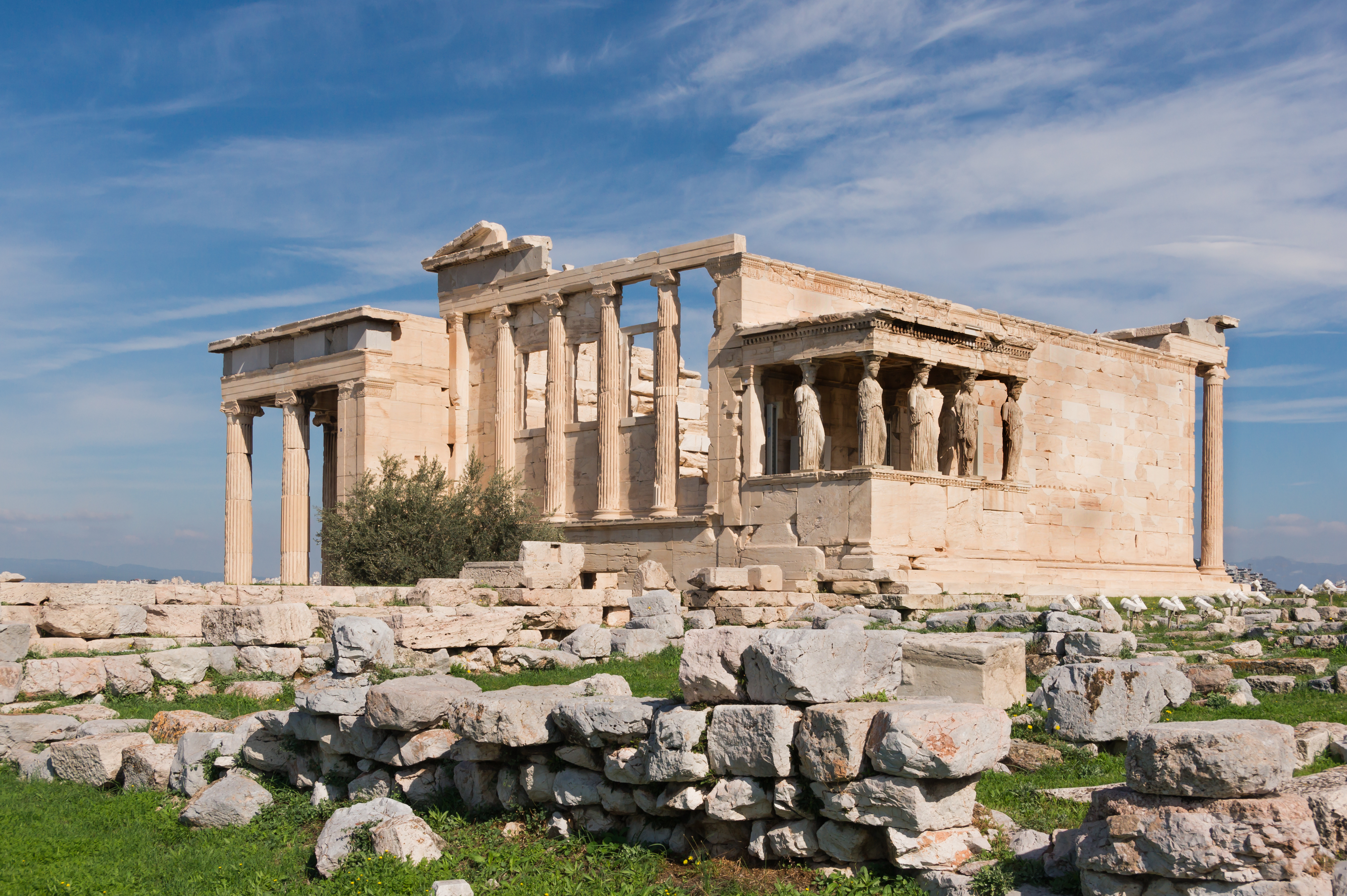
Erechtheion, Athens, with its Ionic columns and caryatid porch, 421–405 BC, unknown architect

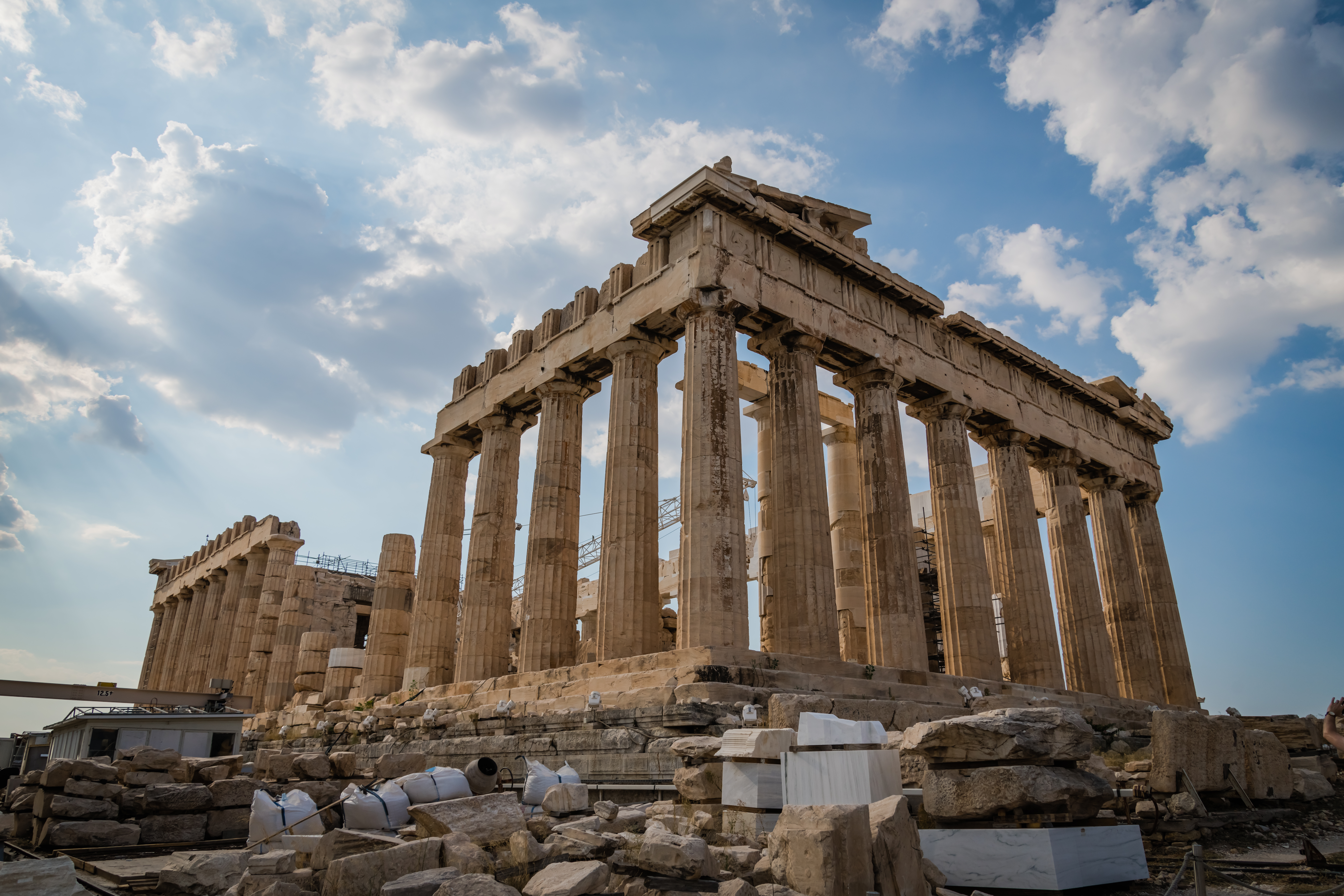
Parthenon, Athens, Greece, 447–432 BC, by Ictinus, Callicrates and Phidias

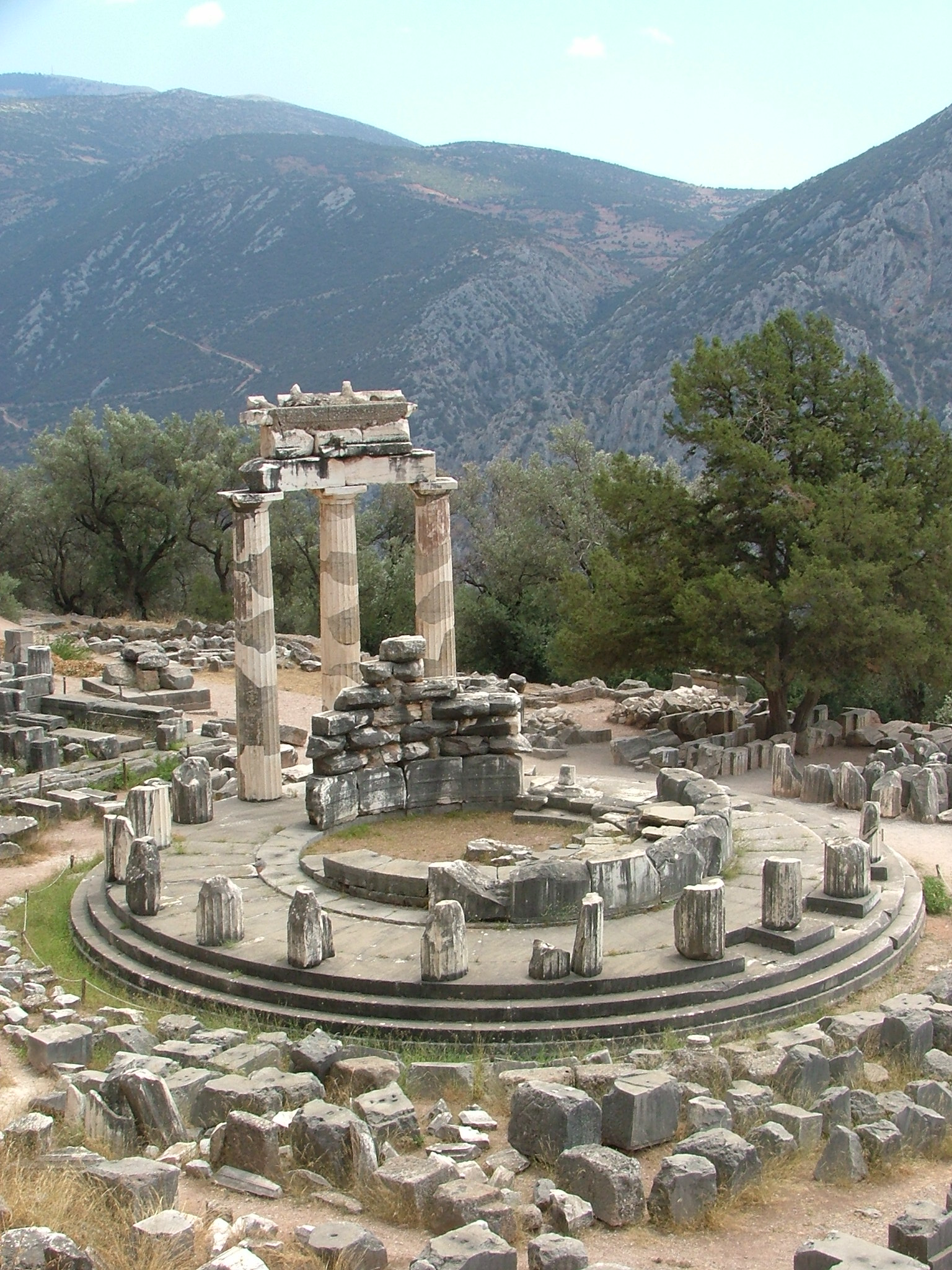
Tholos of the Sanctuary of Athena Pronaia, Delphi, Greece, 380–360 BC, by Theodoros of Phocaea

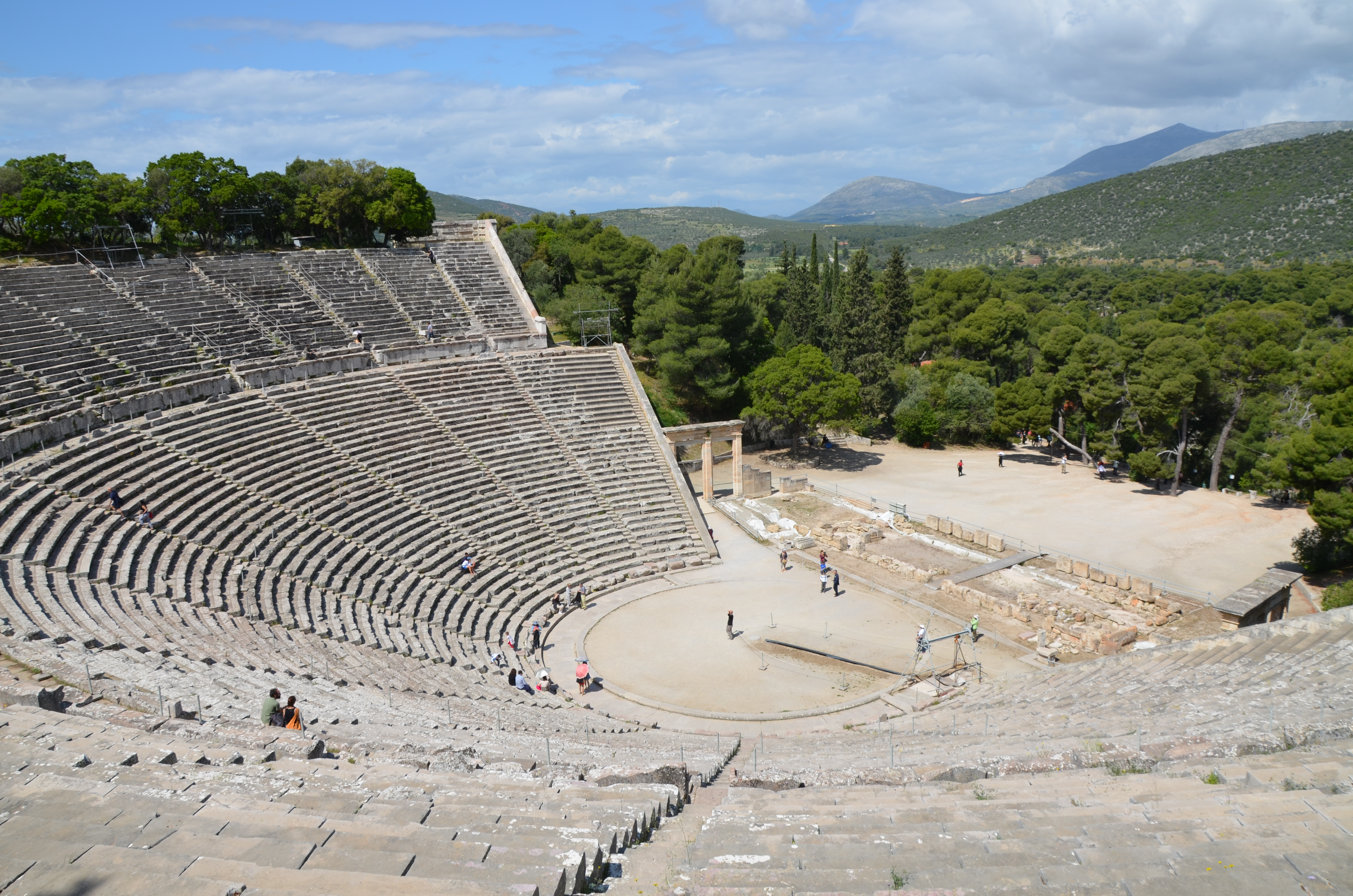
Ancient Theatre of Epidaurus, Epidaurus, Greece, 3rd century BC, unknown architect

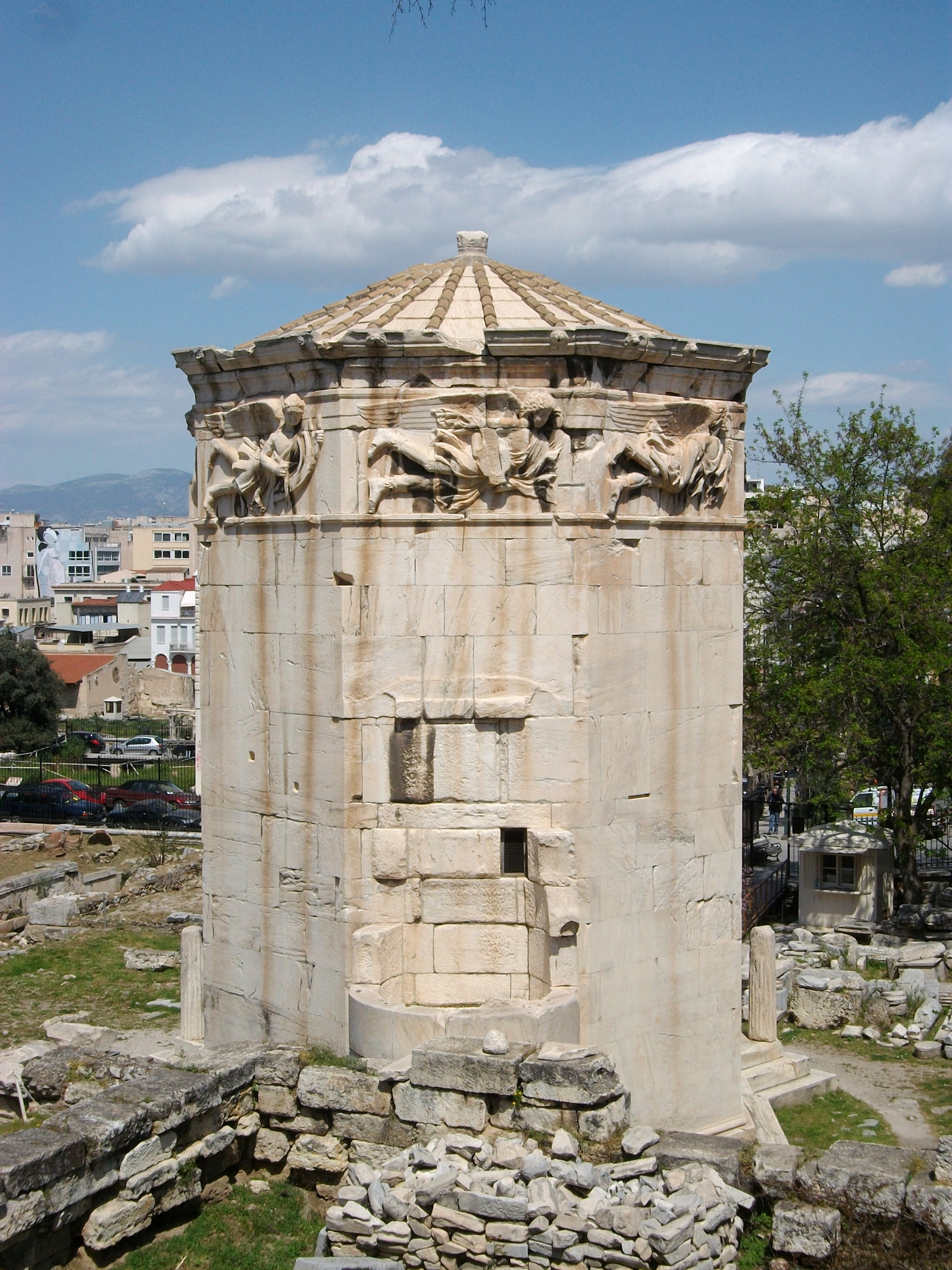
Tower of the Winds, Athens, 1st century BC, unknown architect

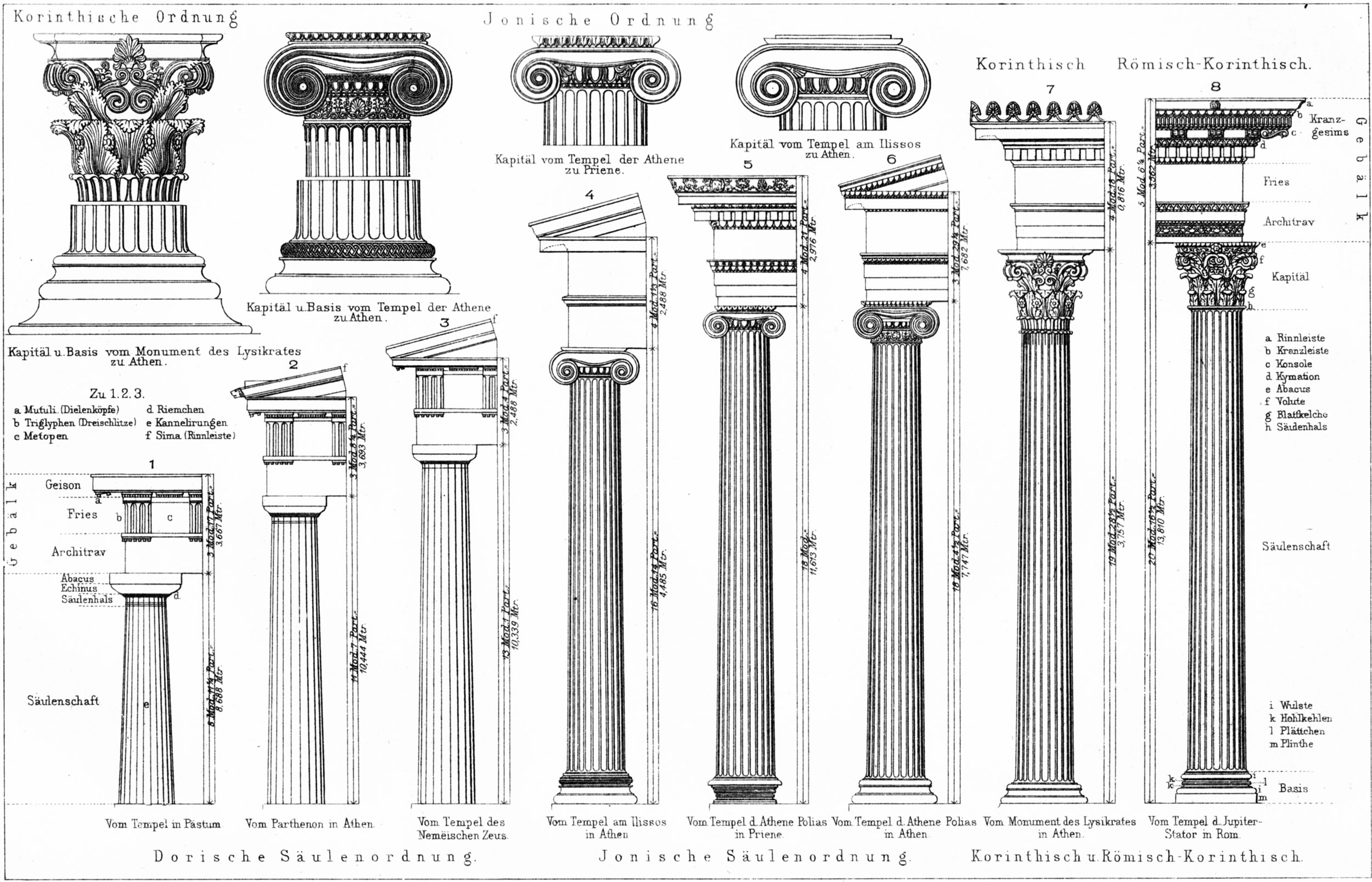
Illustration of Doric (left three), Ionic (middle three) and Corinthian (right two) columns and entablatures

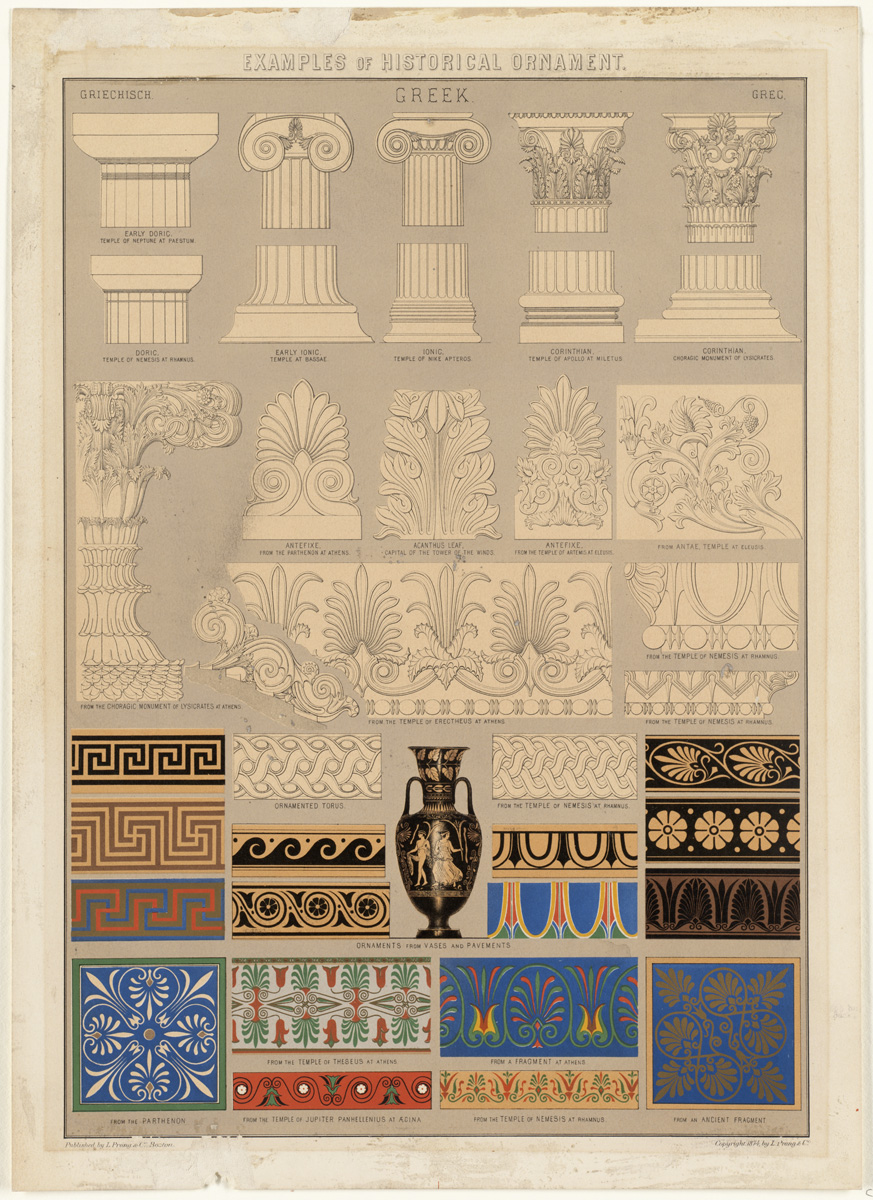
Illustrations from 1874 of ornaments and patterns used by ancient Greeks and Romans

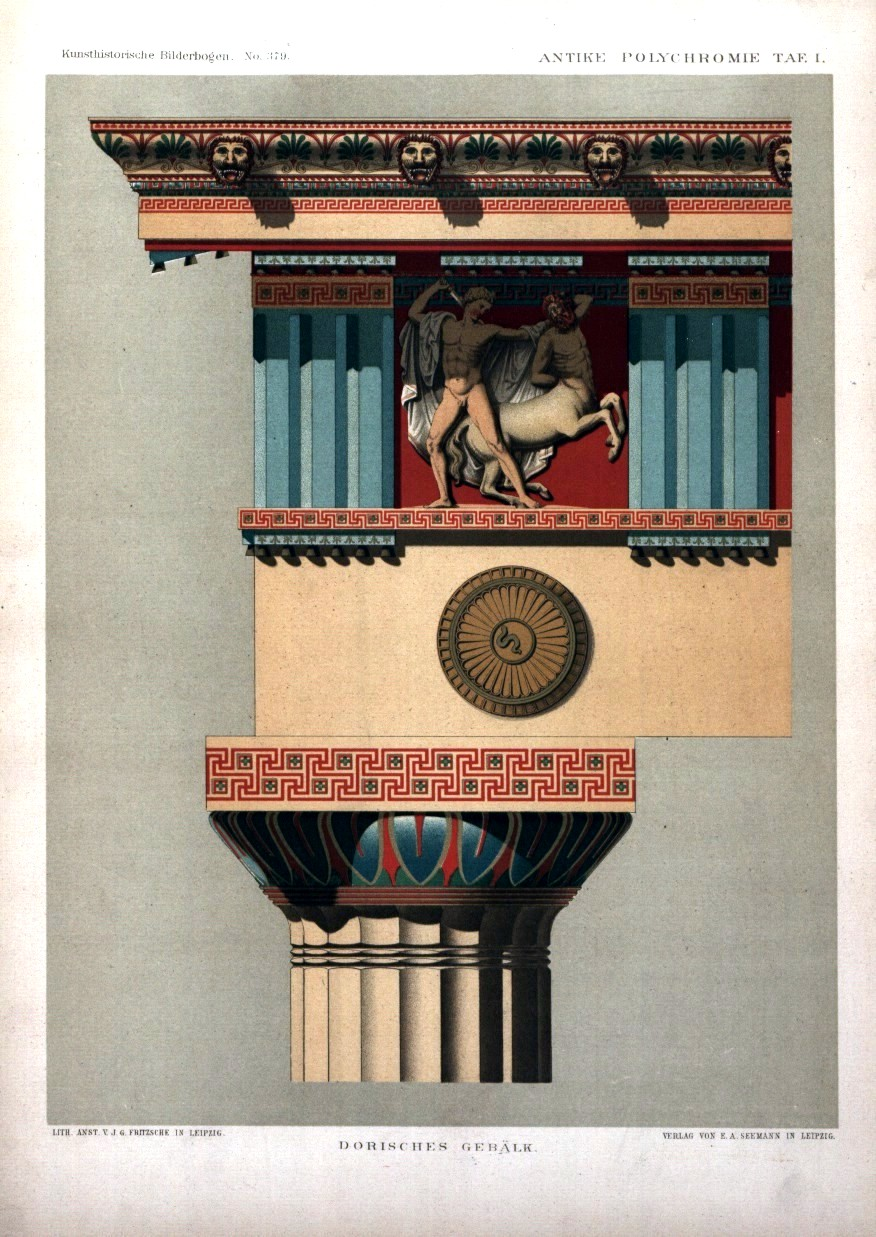
Illustration from 1883 that shows the colour scheme of the Doric order

Since the advent of the Classical Age in Athens, in the 5th century BC, the Classical way of building has been deeply woven into Western understanding of architecture and, indeed, of civilization itself. From circa 850 BC to circa 300 AD, ancient Greek culture flourished on the Greek mainland, on the Peloponnese, and on the Aegean islands. However, Ancient Greek architecture is best known for its temples, many of which are found throughout the region, and the Parthenon is a prime example of this. Later, they will serve as inspiration for Neoclassical architects during the late 18th and the 19th century. The most well-known temples are the Parthenon and the Erechtheion, both on the Acropolis of Athens. Another type of important Ancient Greek buildings were the theatres. Both temples and theatres used a complex mix of optical illusions and balanced ratios.

Ancient Greek temples usually consist of a base with continuous stairs of a few steps at each edges (known as crepidoma), a cella (or naos) with a cult statue in it, columns, an entablature, and two pediments, one on the front side and another in the back. By the 4th century BC, Greek architects and stonemasons had developed a system of rules for all buildings known as the orders: the Doric, the Ionic, and the Corinthian. They are most easily recognised by their columns (especially by the capitals). The Doric column is stout and basic, the Ionic one is slimmer and has four scrolls (called volutes) at the corners of the capital, and the Corinthian column is just like the Ionic one, but the capital is completely different, being decorated with acanthus leaves and four scrolls. Besides columns, the frieze was different based on order. While the Doric one has metopes and triglyphs with guttae, Ionic and Corinthian friezes consist of one big continuous band with reliefs.

Besides the columns, the temples were highly decorated with sculptures, in the pediments, on the friezes, metopes and triglyphs. Ornaments used by Ancient Greek architects and artists include palmettes, vegetal or wave-like scrolls, lion mascarons (mostly on lateral cornices), dentils, acanthus leaves, bucrania, festoons, egg-and-dart, rais-de-cœur, beads, meanders, and acroteria at the corners of the pediments. Pretty often, ancient Greek ornaments are used continuously, as bands. They will later be used in Etruscan, Roman and in the post-medieval styles that tried to revive Greco-Roman art and architecture, like Renaissance, Baroque, Neoclassical etc.

Looking at the archaeological remains of ancient and medieval buildings it is easy to perceive them as limestone and concrete in a grey taupe tone and make the assumption that ancient buildings were monochromatic. However, architecture was polychromed in much of the Ancient and Medieval world. One of the most iconic Ancient buildings, the Parthenon (c. 447–432 BC) in Athens, had details painted with vibrant reds, blues and greens. Besides ancient temples, Medieval cathedrals were never completely white. Most had colored highlights on capitals and columns. This practice of coloring buildings and artworks was abandoned during the early Renaissance. This is because Leonardo da Vinci and other Renaissance artists, including Michelangelo, promoted a color palette inspired by the ancient Greco-Roman ruins, which because of neglect and constant decay during the Middle Ages, became white despite being initially colorful. The pigments used in the ancient world were delicate and especially susceptible to weathering. Without necessary care, the colors exposed to rain, snow, dirt, and other factors, vanished over time, and this way Ancient buildings and artworks became white, like they are today and were during the Renaissance.

=== Celtic ===
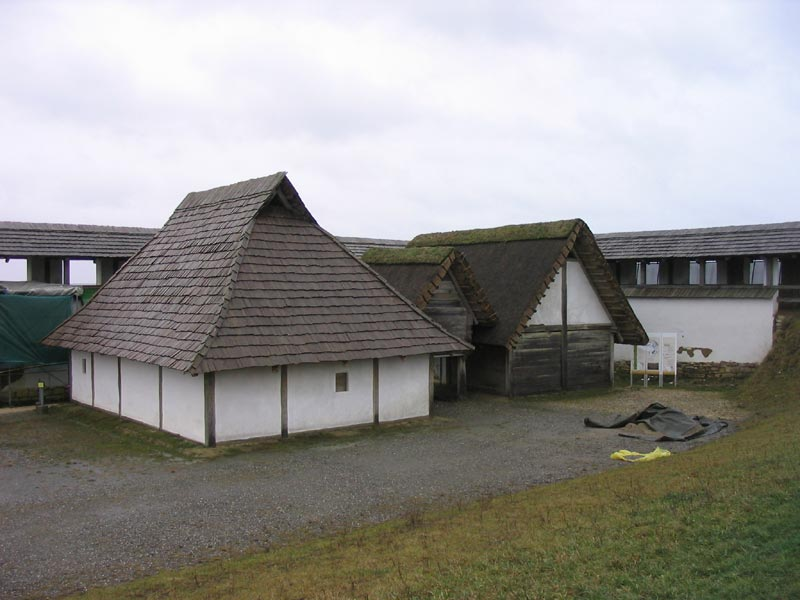
Reconstructed walls and building at the Heuneburg by the Danube, Germany, c. 600 BC, the oldest city north of the Alps

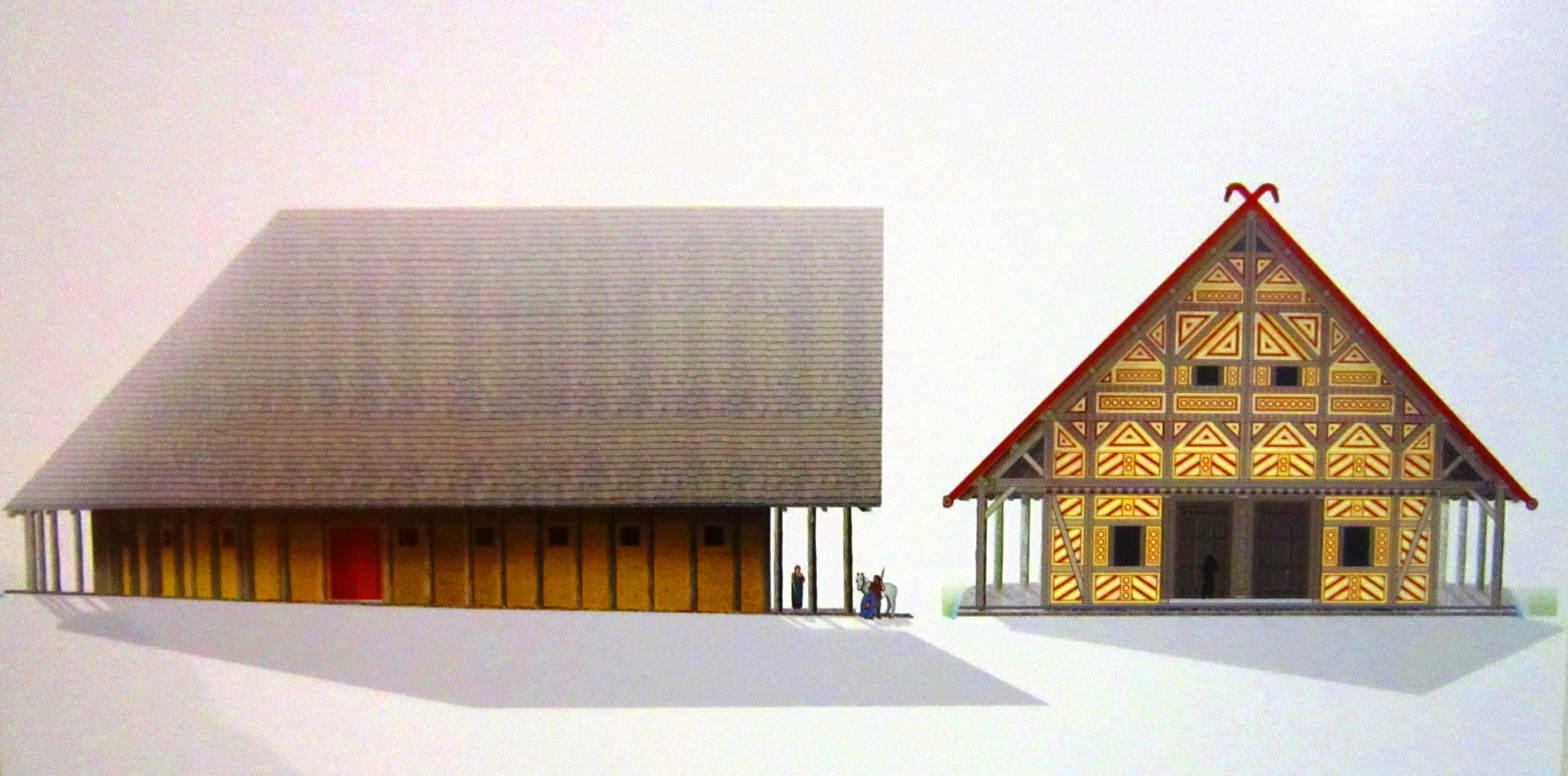
Vix palace (reconstruction), Mont Lassois, France, unknown architect, late 6th century BC

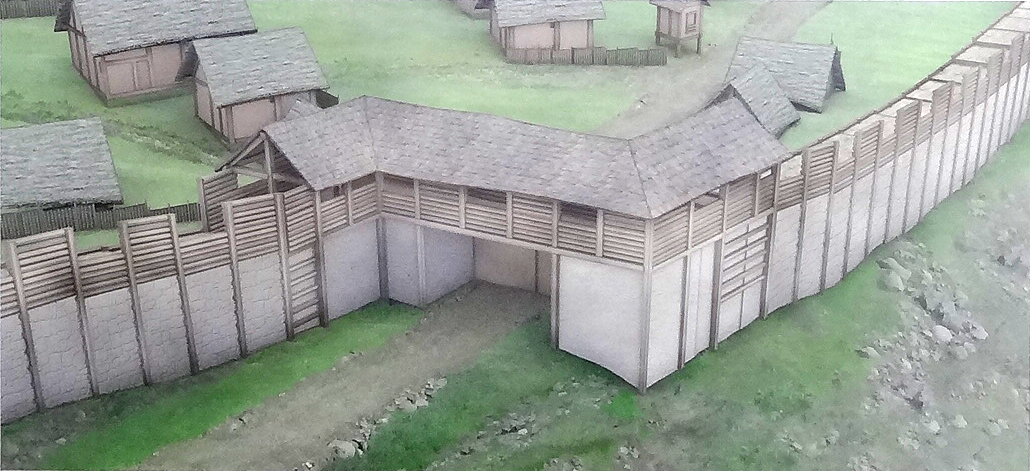
Glauberg oppidum, Germany, main entrance gate (reconstruction), unknown architect, c. 500 BC

Celtic architecture, in its broadest sense, refers to the styles and structures associated with the Celtic peoples who once inhabited a large part of Europe, including parts of modern-day France, Germany, the British Isles, and beyond. This architecture is difficult to define strictly because the Celts did not have a unified, standardized architectural style across the different regions they inhabited. However, general characteristics of Celtic architecture are shared, for example, in structures of central Europe like from Germany and France, which provide insights into the material culture and architectural forms of the Celts in these regions.

Many Celtic structures, particularly in the earlier periods, were made of wood, which has not survived as well as stone or other materials. The Celts often built round houses and settlements, with circular huts (or roundhouses) being the most common residential structures. The Celts were skilled in creating defensive structures, such as hillforts, which included ditches, ramparts, and palisades. In later periods, especially during the Iron Age, some Celtic groups began constructing stone buildings, such as temples, shrines, and more permanent dwellings.

One of the most famous Celtic sites is the Heuneburg, located on the Swabian Jura in Germany. Heuneburg was a large Celtic settlement and a key center of power in the late Hallstatt and early La Tène periods. The site is famous for its fortifications, including large earthworks and timber palisades, indicative of the Celtic emphasis on defensive architecture. The Mont Lassois is another important Celtic archaeological site located in the Burgundy region of eastern France, near the town of Montbard, in the Côte-d'Or department. The site is notable for being one of the largest and most significant Celtic oppida (fortified settlements) of the La Tène period (approximately 450 BCE to 1 BCE). Mont Lassois offers crucial insights into Celtic urban planning, architecture, and the socio-political organization of the Celtic tribes in Gaul just before the Roman conquest. The Glauberg Celtic hillfort or oppidum in Hesse, Germany, is consisting of a fortified settlement and several burial mounds, "a princely seat of the late Hallstatt and early La Tène periods." Archaeological discoveries in the 1990s place the site among the most important early Celtic centres in Europe. It provides unprecedented evidence on Celtic burial, sculpture and monumental architecture.

=== Nabataean ===
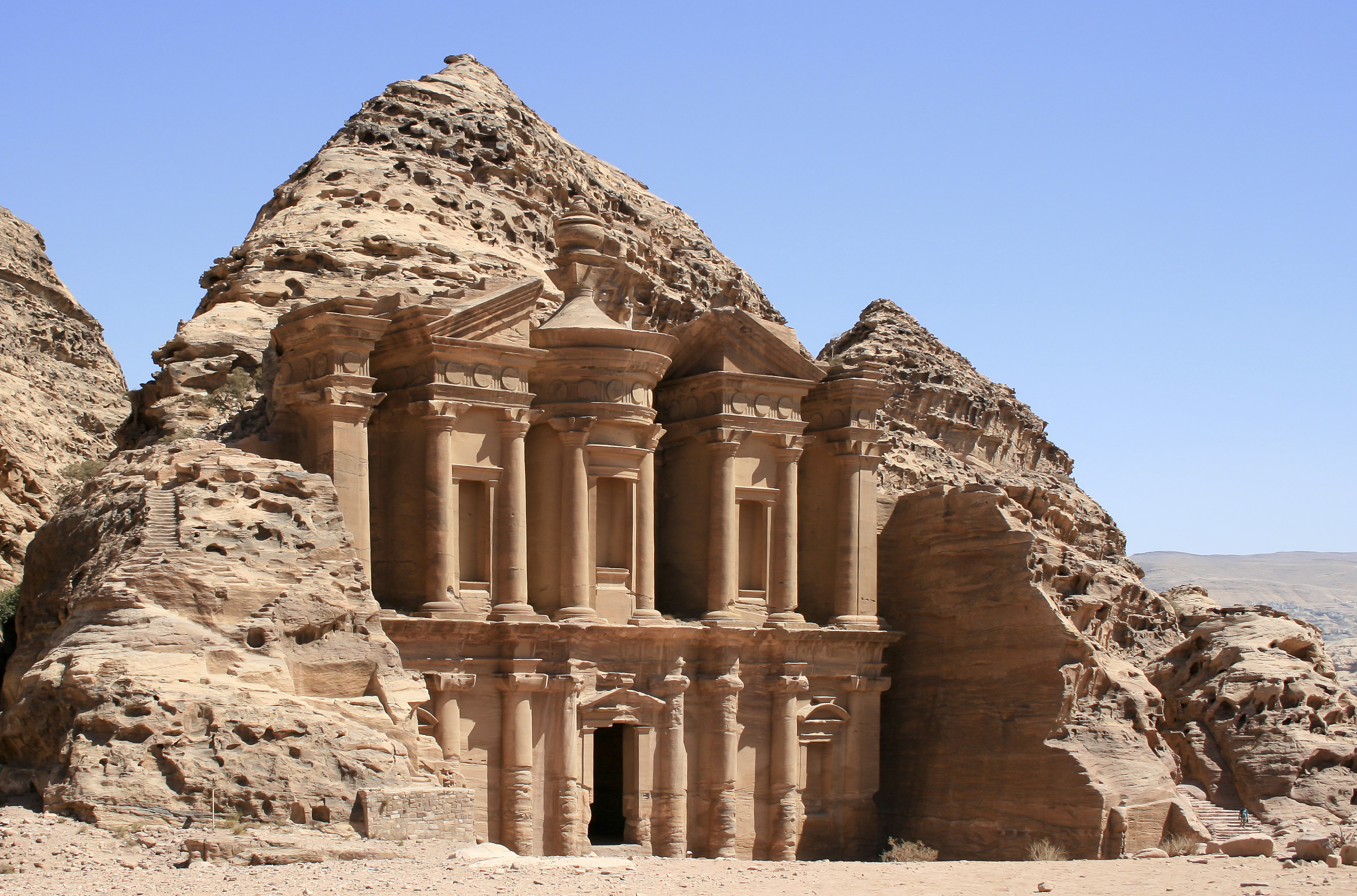
Ed-Deir, Petra, unknown architect, 1st century AD

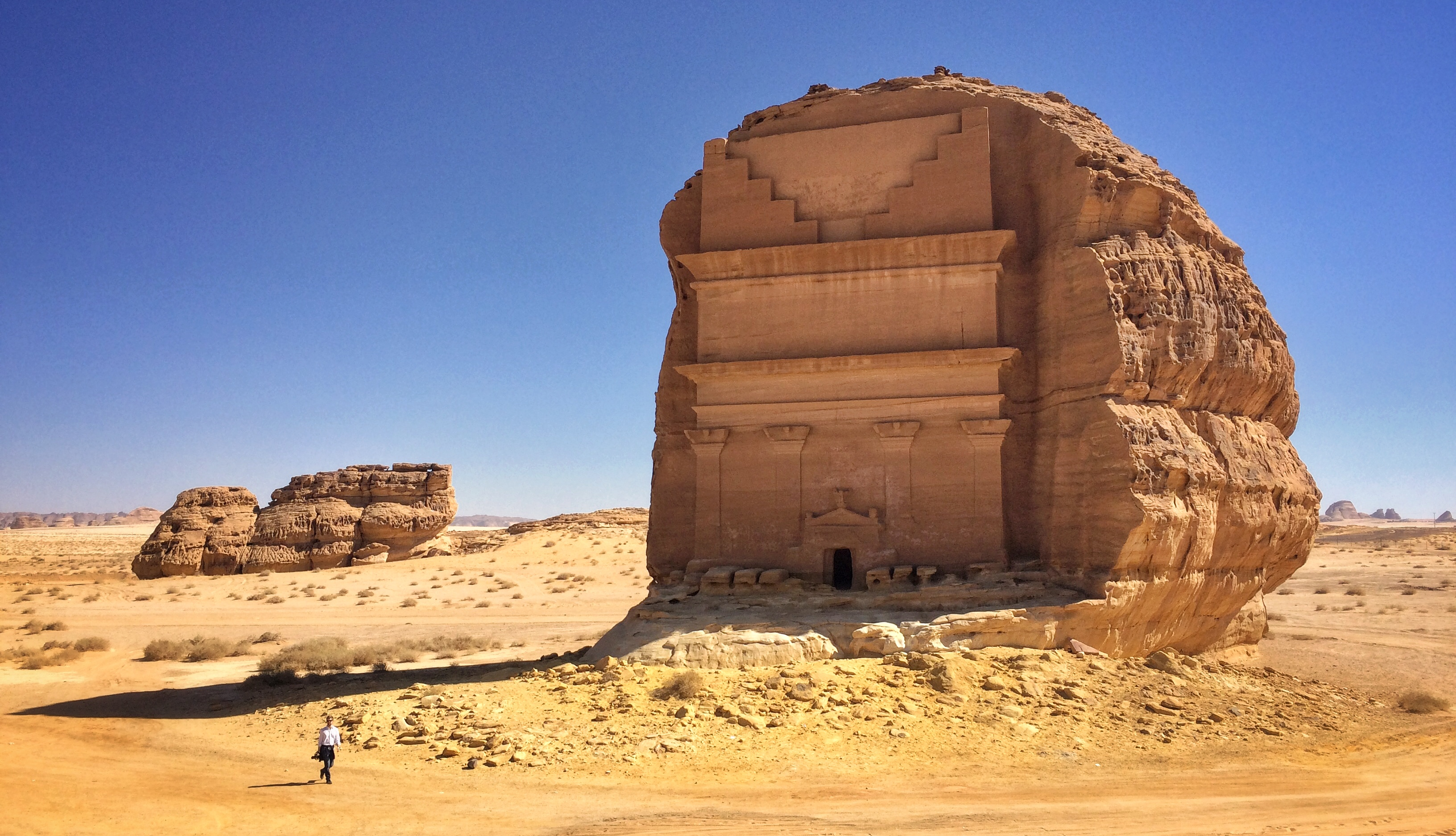
Qaṣr al-Farīd, Hegra (Mada’in Salih), unknown architect, 1st century AD

The Nabataeans, an ancient Arab people, had an architectural style that is notable for its rock-cut temples and tombs, most famously the ones found in Petra, Jordan. Another partially preserved site is found at Hegra (Mada'in Salih), Saudi Arabia. Most architectural Nabatean remains, dating from the 1st century BC to the 2nd century AD, are highly visible and well-preserved, with over 500 monuments in Petra, in modern-day Jordan, and 110 well preserved tombs set in the desert landscape of Hegra.

=== Roman ===
Colosseum, Rome, unknown architect, 72–80 AD

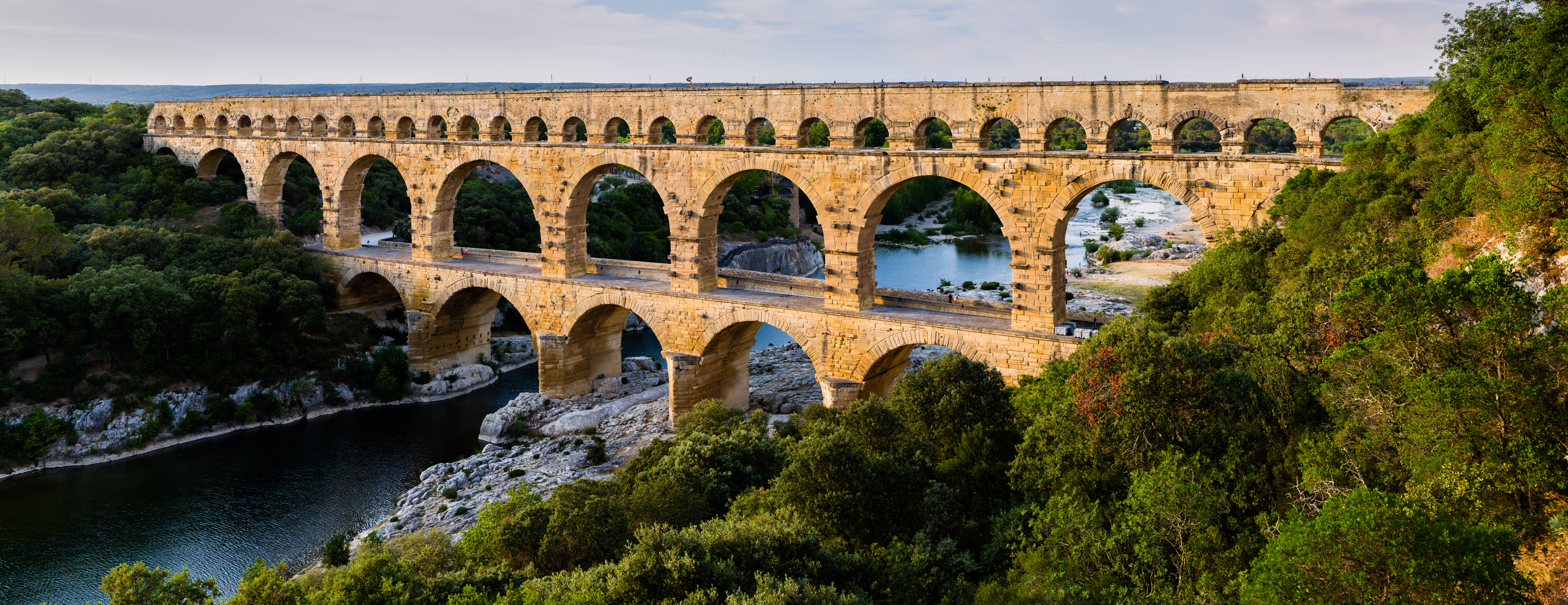
Pont du Gard, Vers-Pont-du-Gard, Gard, France, a Roman aqueduct, unknown architect, 40–60 AD

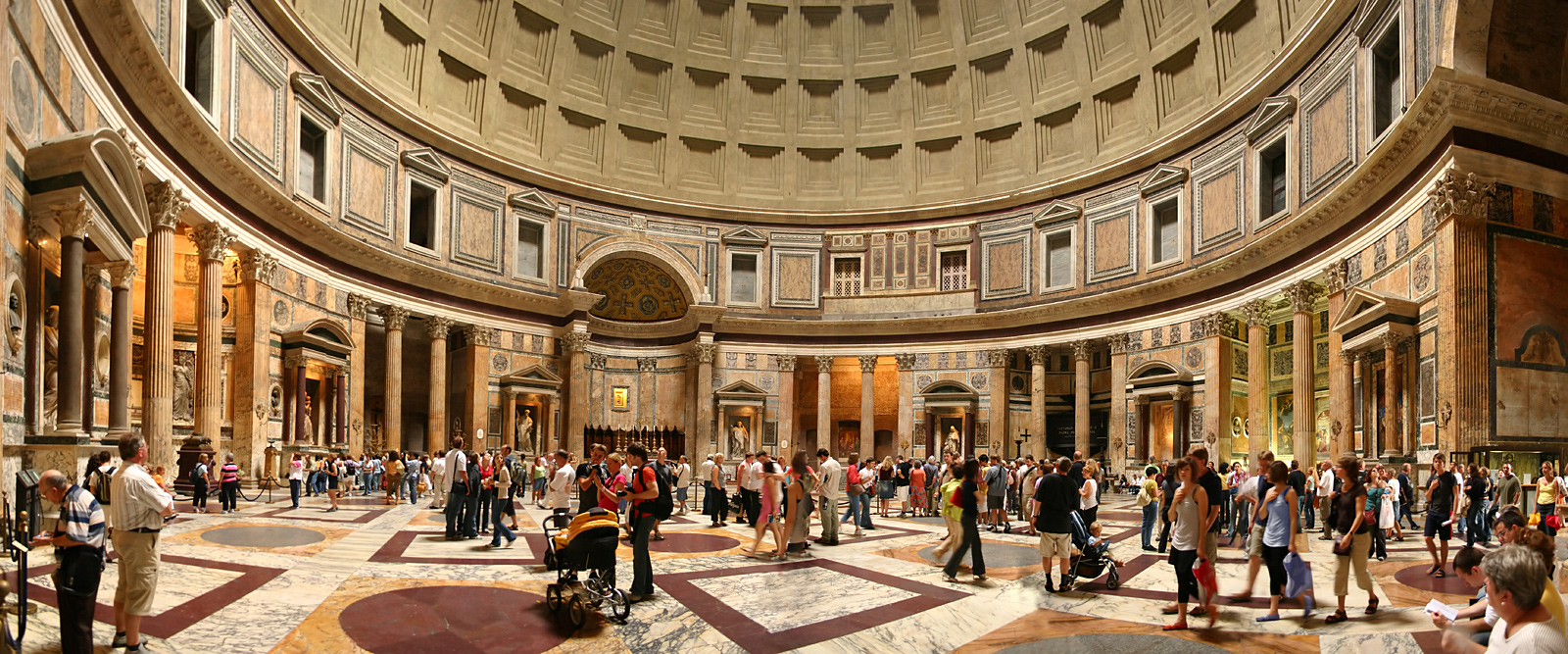
Pantheon, Rome, unknown architect, c.114-123 AD

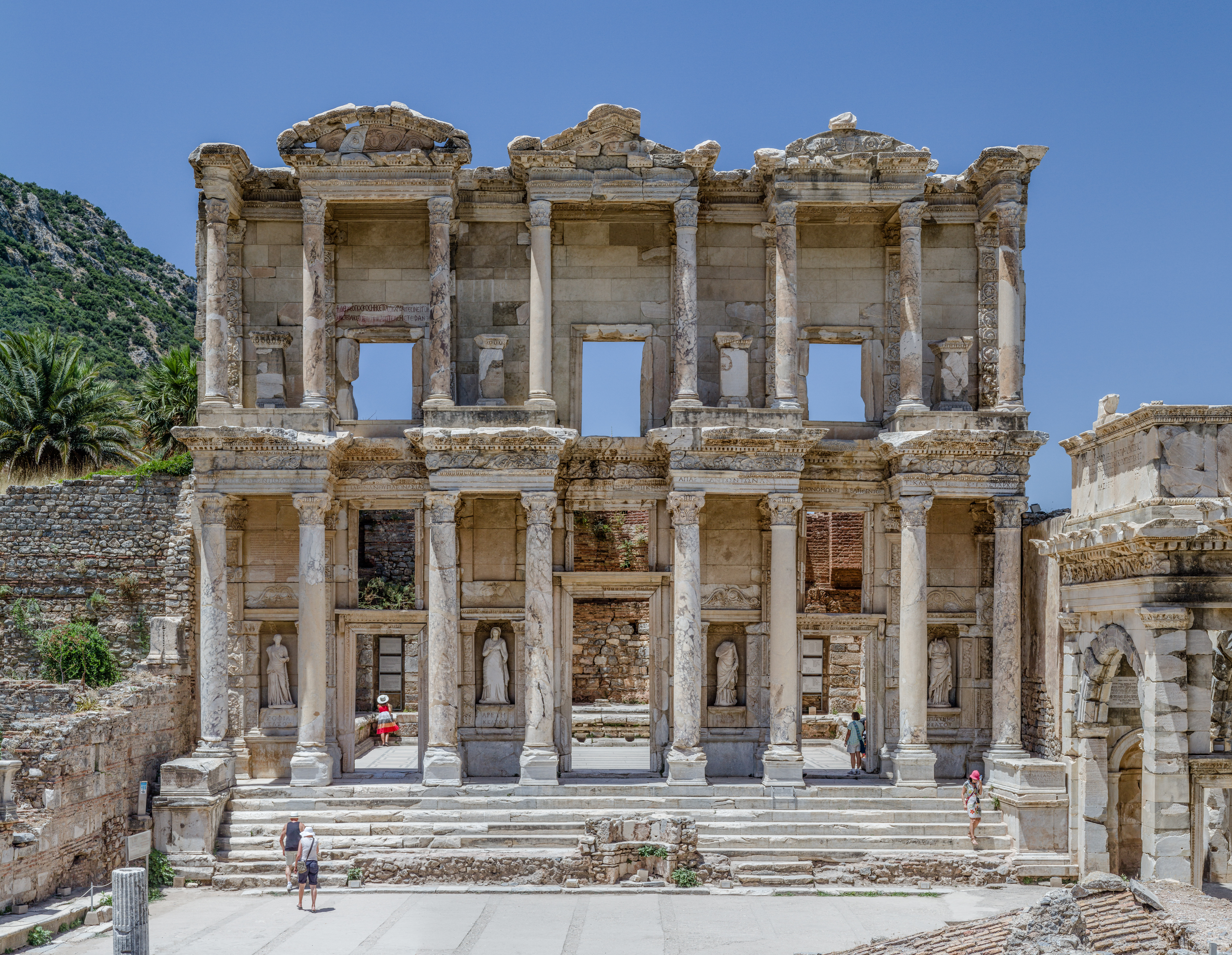
Library of Celsus, Ephesus, Turkey, unknown architect, c.112–120 AD

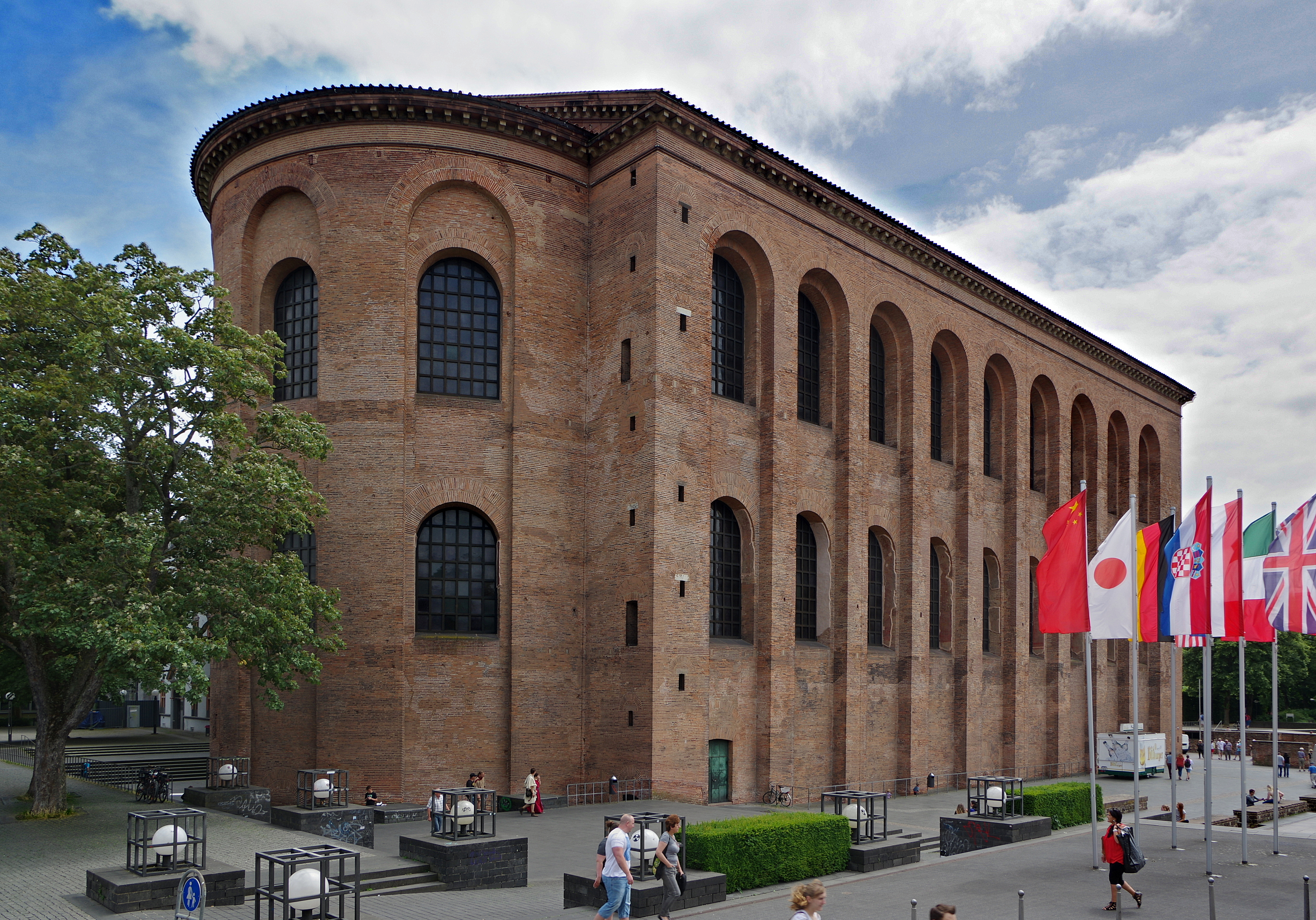
Aula Palatina, largest extant hall from antiquity, Trier, Germany, unknown architect, 300-310 AD

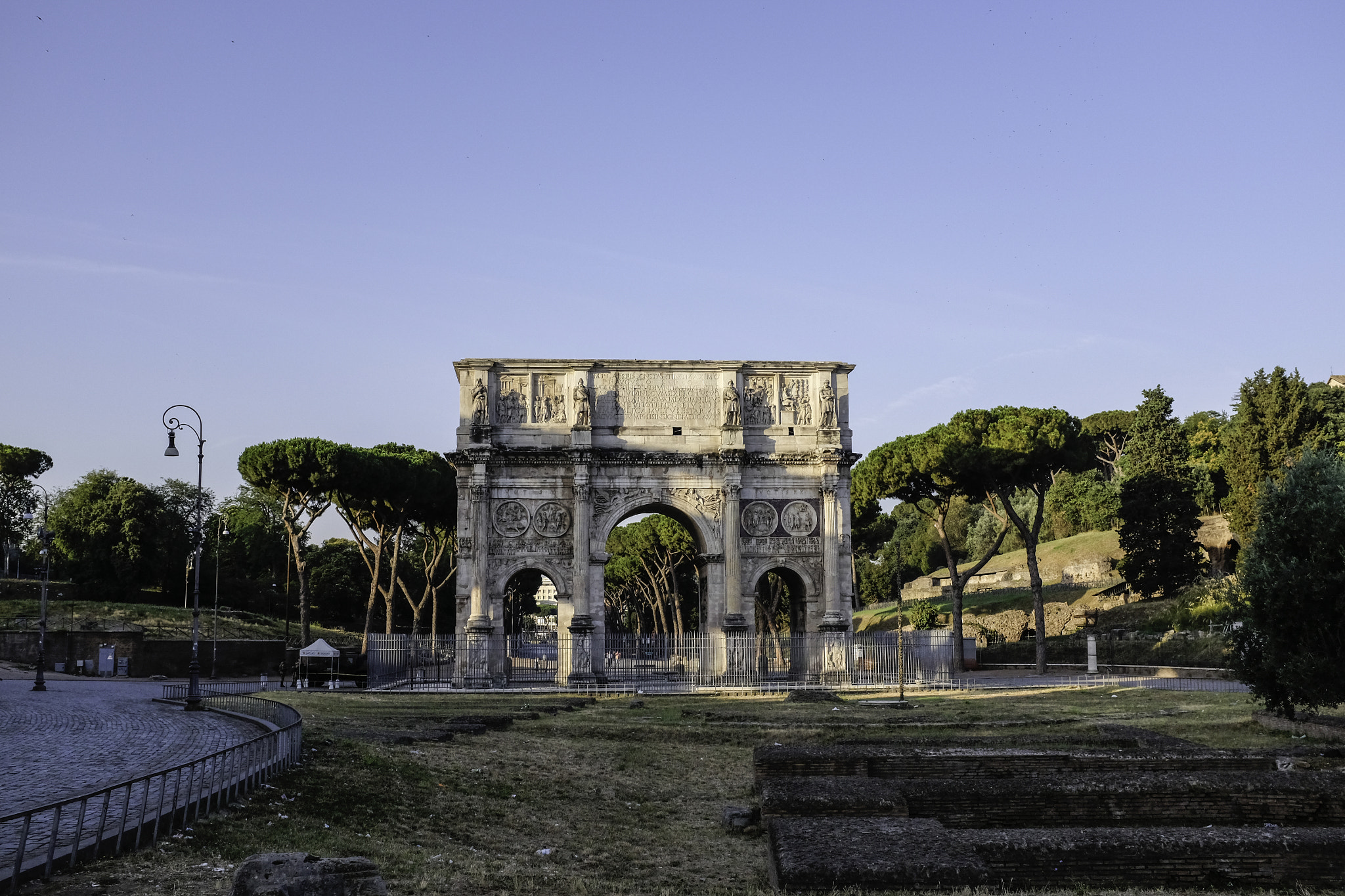
Arch of Constantine, Rome, unknown architect, 316 AD

The architecture of ancient Rome has been one of the most influential in the world. Its legacy is evident throughout the medieval and early modern periods, and Roman buildings continue to be reused in the modern era in both New Classical and Postmodern architecture. It was particularly influenced by Greek and Etruscan styles. A range of temple types was developed during the republican years (509–27 BC), modified from Greek and Etruscan prototypes.

Wherever the Roman army conquered, they established towns and cities, spreading their empire and advancing their architectural and engineering achievements. While the most important works are to be found in Italy, Roman builders also found creative outlets in the western and eastern provinces, of which the best examples preserved are in modern-day North Africa, Turkey, Syria and Jordan. Extravagant projects appeared, like the Arch of Septimius Severus in Leptis Magna (present-day Libya, built in 216 AD), with broken pediments on all sides, or the Arch of Caracalla in Thebeste (present-day Algeria, built in c.214 AD), with paired columns on all sides, projecting entablatures and medallions with divine busts. Due to the fact that the empire was formed from multiple nations and cultures, some buildings were the product of combining the Roman style with the local tradition. An example is the Palmyra Arch (present-day Syria, built in c.212–220), some of its arches being embellished with a repeated band design consisting of four ovals within a circle around a rosette, which are of Eastern origin.

Among the many Roman architectural achievements were domes (which were created for temples), baths, villas, palaces and tombs. The best known example is that of the Pantheon in Rome, being the largest surviving Roman dome and having a large oculus at its centre. Another important innovation is the rounded stone arch, used in arcades, aqueducts and other structures. Besides the Greek orders (Doric, Ionic and Corinthian), the Romans invented two more. The Tuscan order was influenced by the Doric, but with un-fluted columns and a simpler entablature with no triglyphs or guttae, while the Composite was a mixed order, combining the volutes of the Ionic order capital with the acanthus leaves of the Corinthian order.

Between 30 and 15 BC, the architect and engineer Marcus Vitruvius Pollio published a major treatise, De architectura, which influenced architects around the world for centuries. As the only treatise on architecture to survive from antiquity, it has been regarded since the Renaissance as the first book on architectural theory, as well as a major source on the canon of classical architecture.

Just like the Greeks, the Romans built amphitheatres too. The largest amphitheatre ever built, the Colosseum in Rome, could hold around 50,000 spectators. Another iconic Roman structure that demonstrates their precision and technological advancement is the Pont du Gard in southern France, the highest surviving Roman aqueduct.

== Americas (Pre-Columbian) ==
From over 3,000 years before the Europeans 'discovered' America, complex societies had already been established across North, Central and South America. The most complex ones were in Mesoamerica, notably the Mayans, the Olmecs and the Aztecs, but also Incas in South America. Structures and buildings were often aligned with astronomical features or with the cardinal directions.

=== Mesoamerica ===
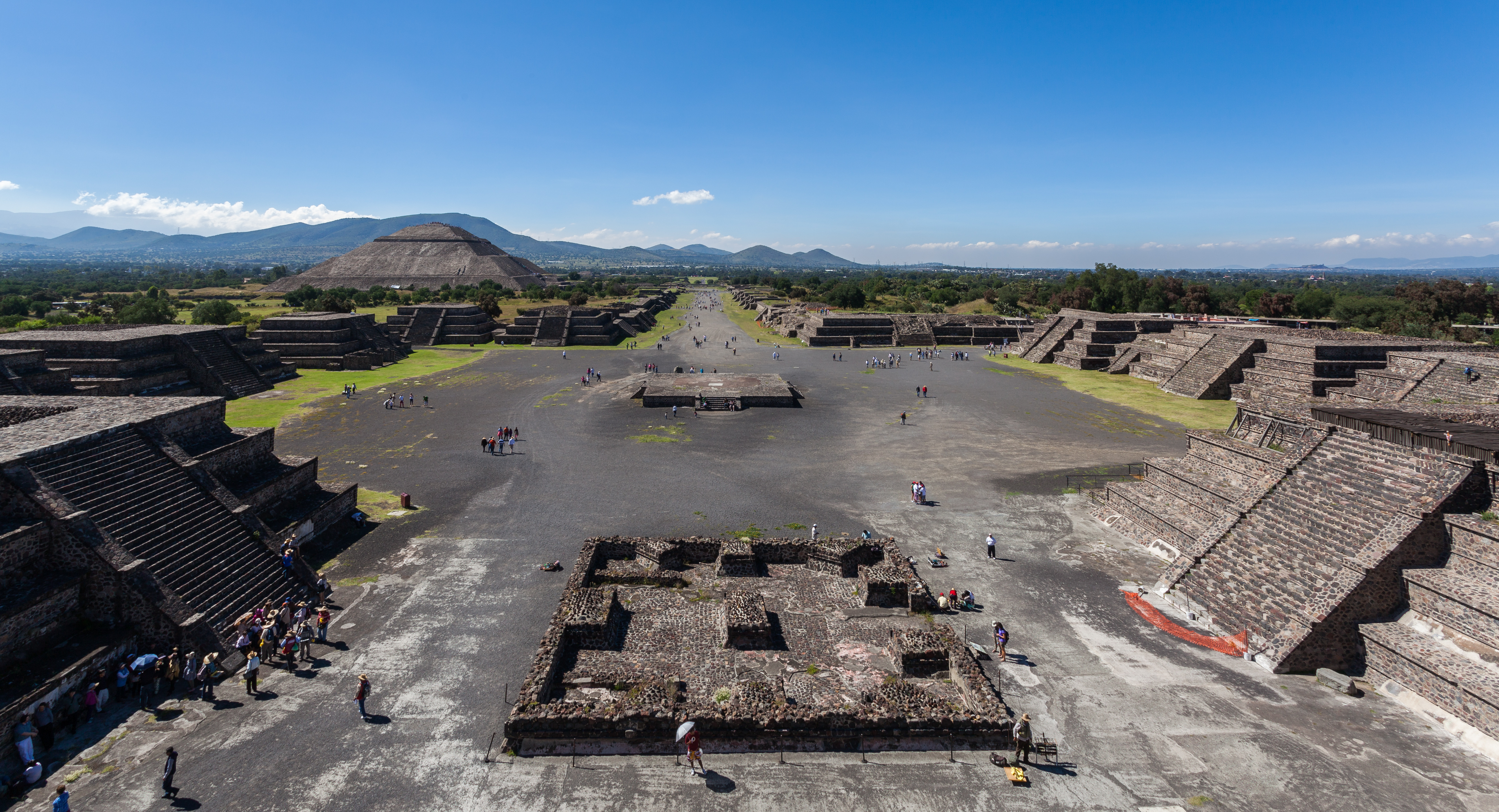
Avenue of the Dead, Teotihuacan, Mexico, 1–600 AD

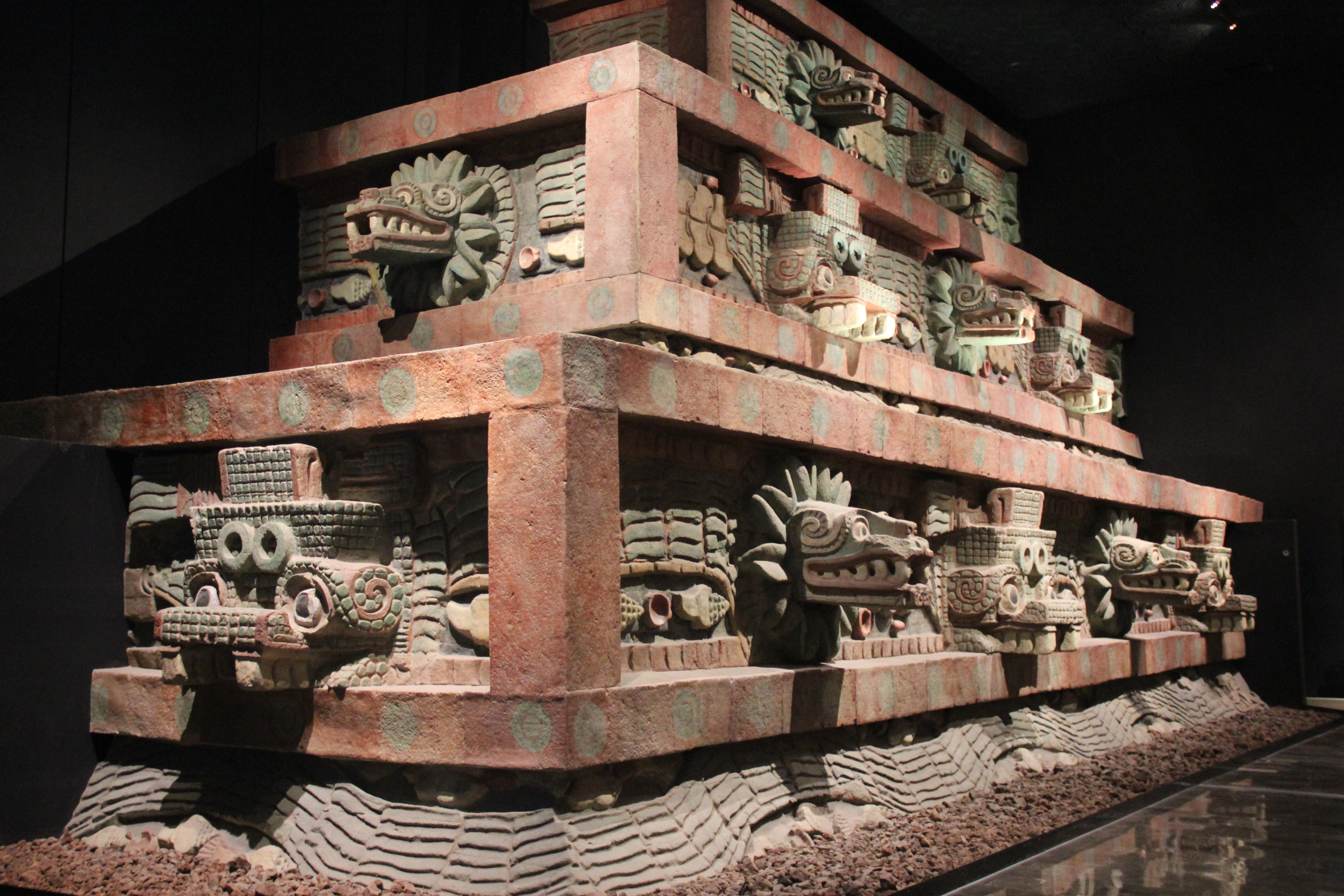
Facade of the Temple of the Feathered Serpent (detail reconstruction), Teotihuacan, Mexico, c.225

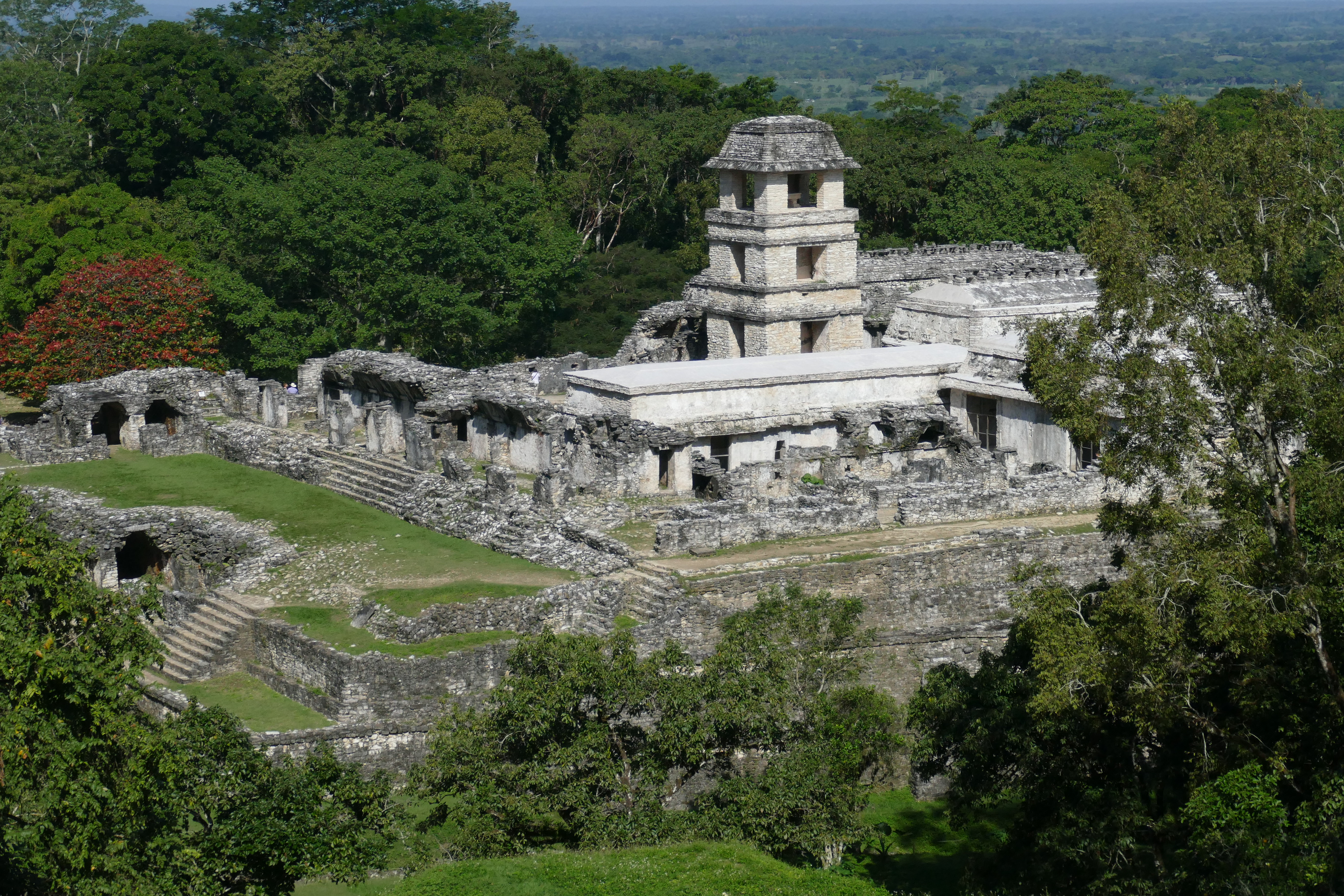
The Palace of Palenque, Chiapas, Mexico, 7th–8th centuries

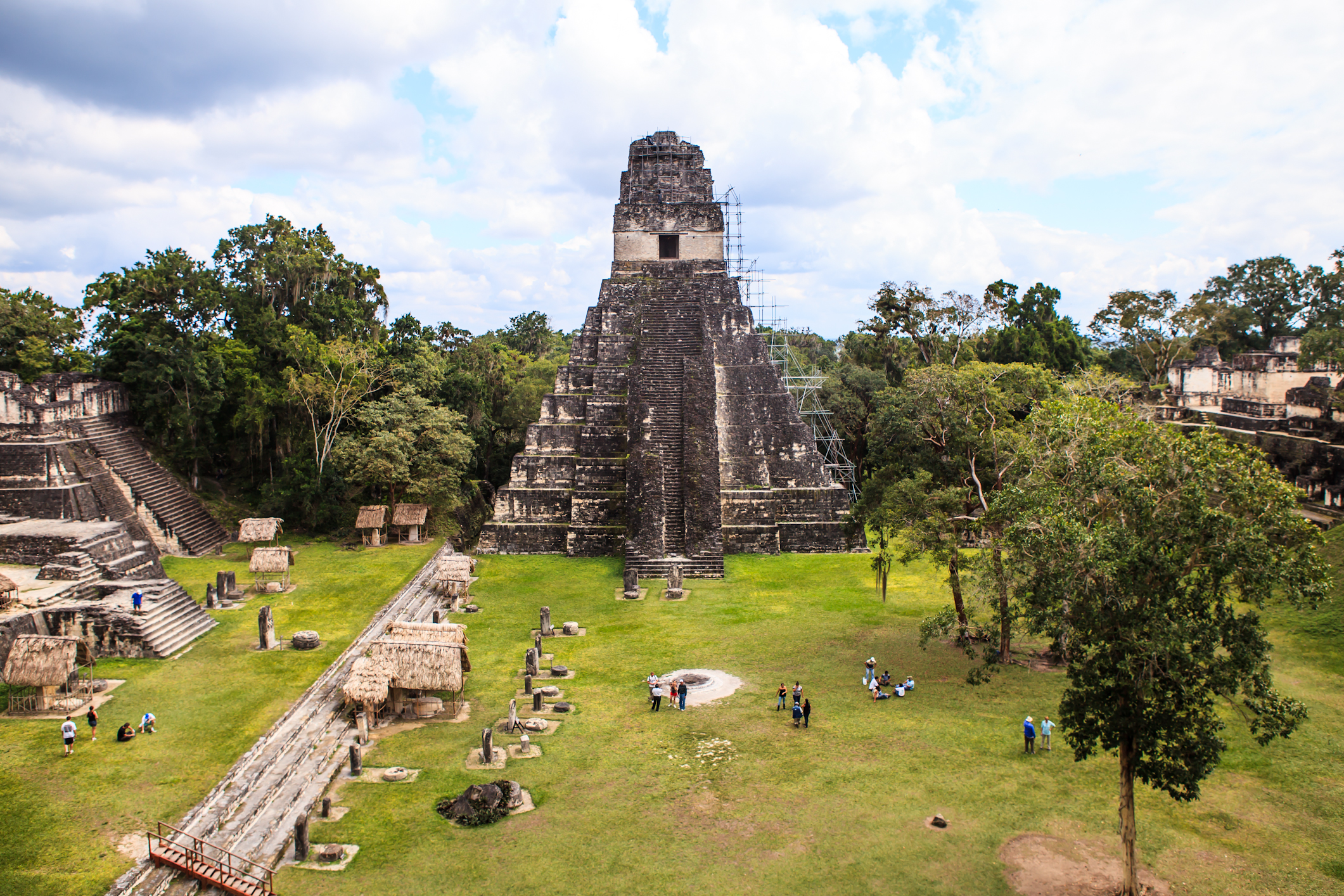
Temple of the Great Jaguar, Tikal, Guatemala, c.732

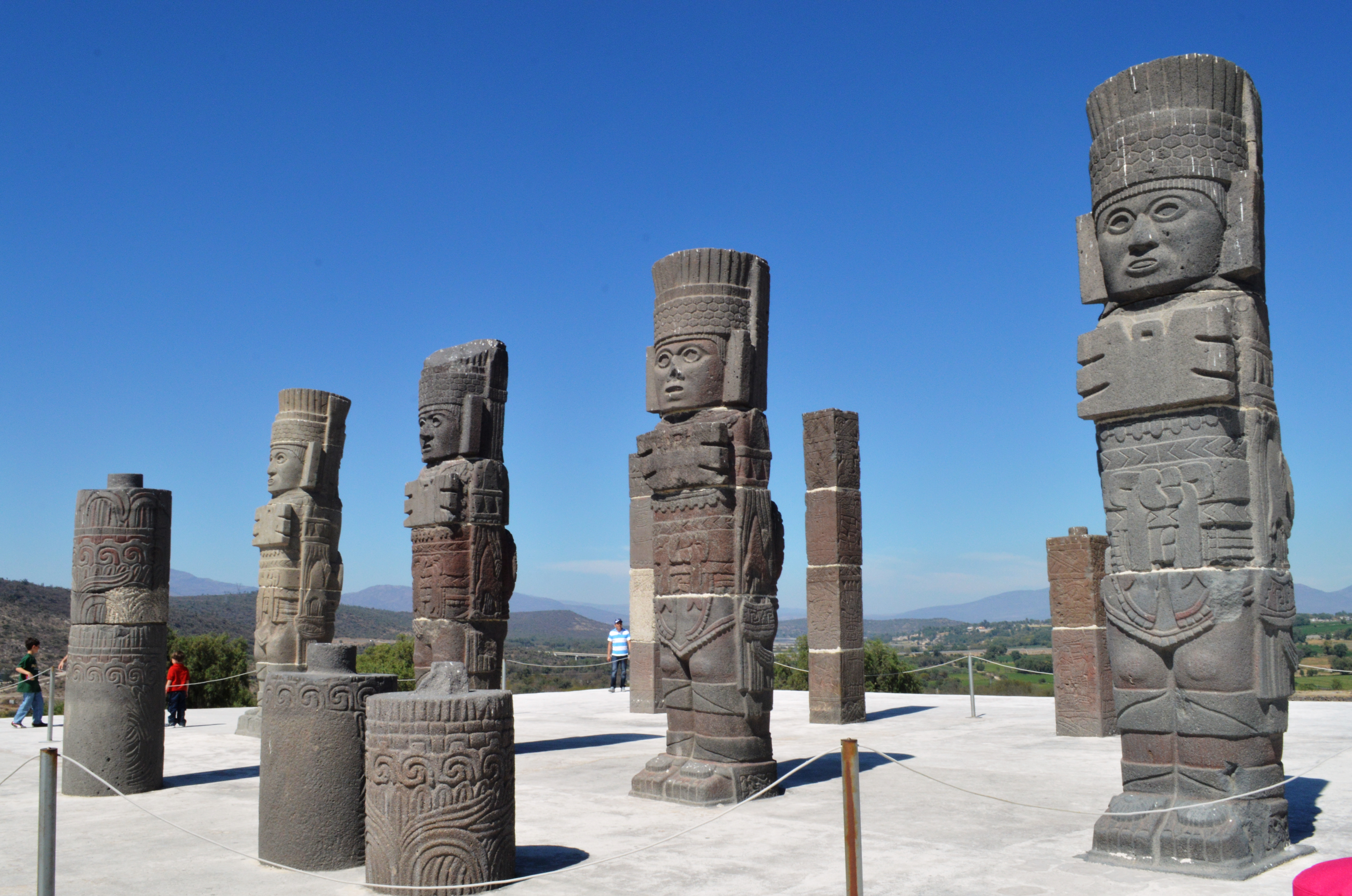
Colossal Toltec atlantes and other sculptures, Tula, Hidalgo, Mexico, c.900-1100, approximative height: 4.88 m

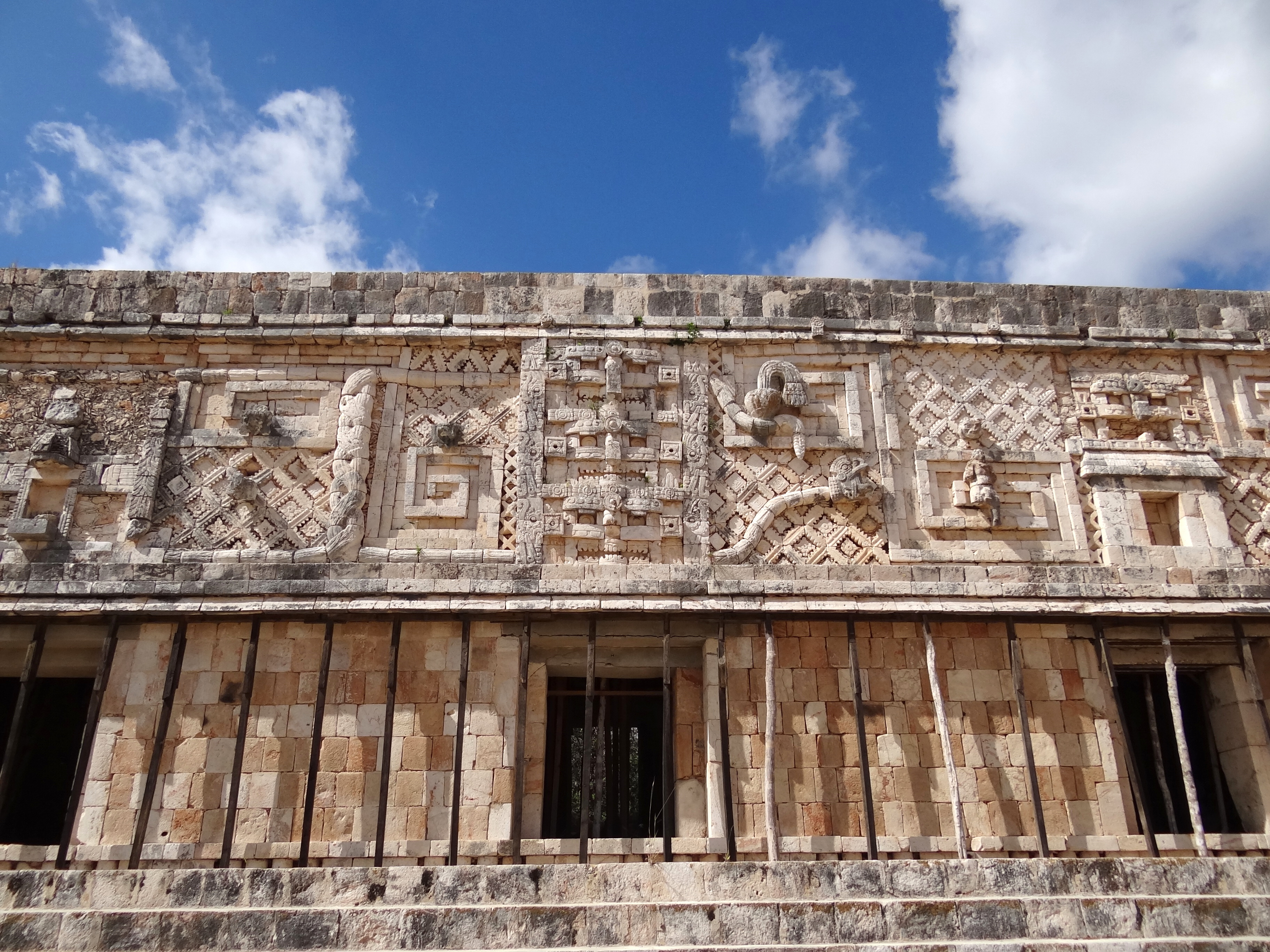
Nunnery Quadrangle, Uxmal, Yucatán, Mexico, 800–1000

Much of the Mesoamerican architecture developed through cultural exchange – for example the Aztecs learnt much from earlier Mayan architecture. Many cultures built entire cities, with monolithic temples and pyramids decoratively carved with animals, gods and kings. Most of these cities had a central plaza with governmental buildings and temples, plus public ball courts, or tlachtli, on raised platforms. Just like in ancient Egypt, here were built pyramids too, being generally stepped. They were probably not used as burial chambers, but had important religious sites at the top. They had few rooms, as interiors mattered less than the ritual presence of these imposing structures and the public ceremonies they hosted; so, platforms, altars, processional stairs, statuary, and carving were all important.

=== Andes ===
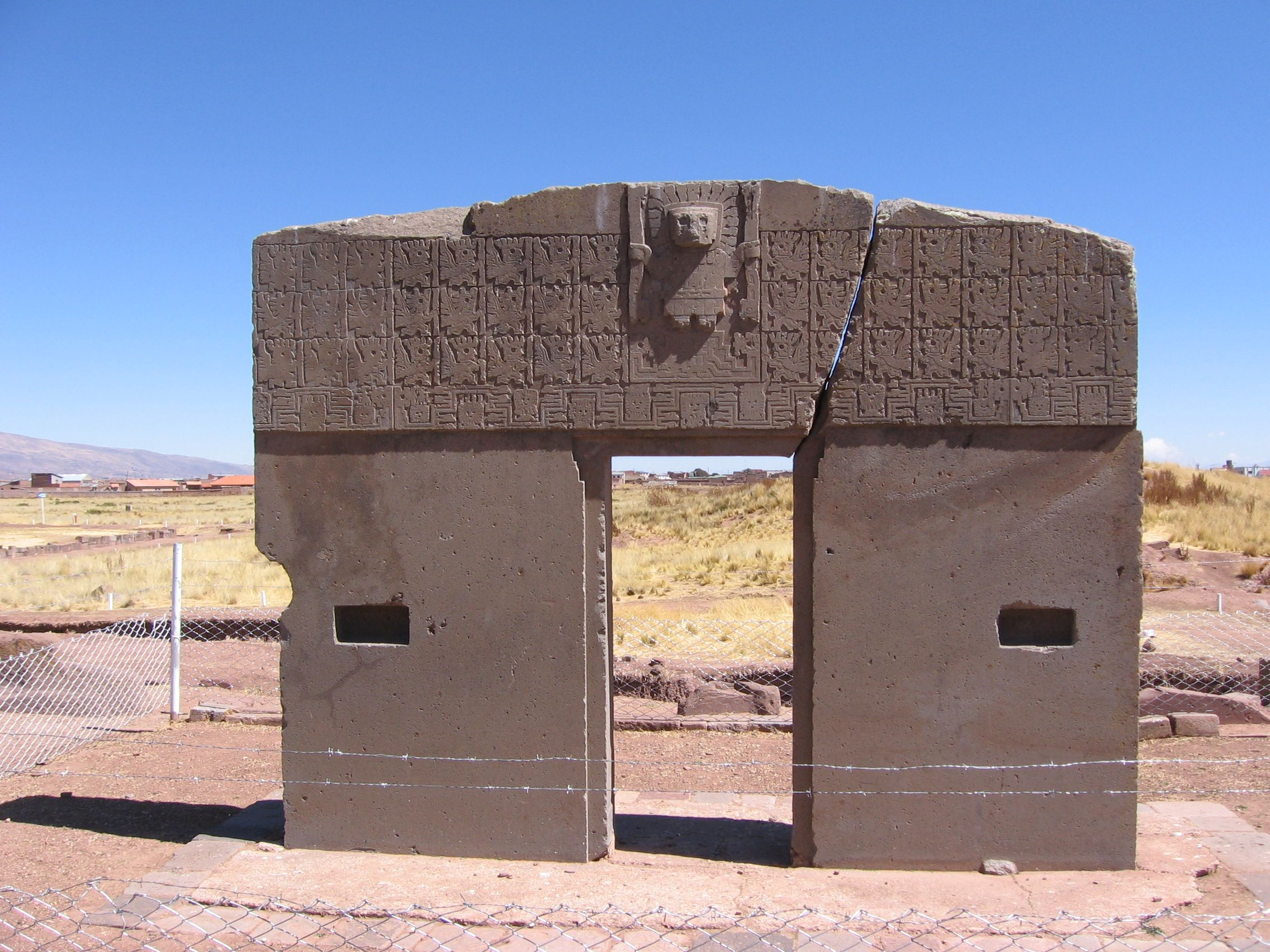
Gateway of the Sun, Tiahuanaco, Bolivia, c.375-500 AD

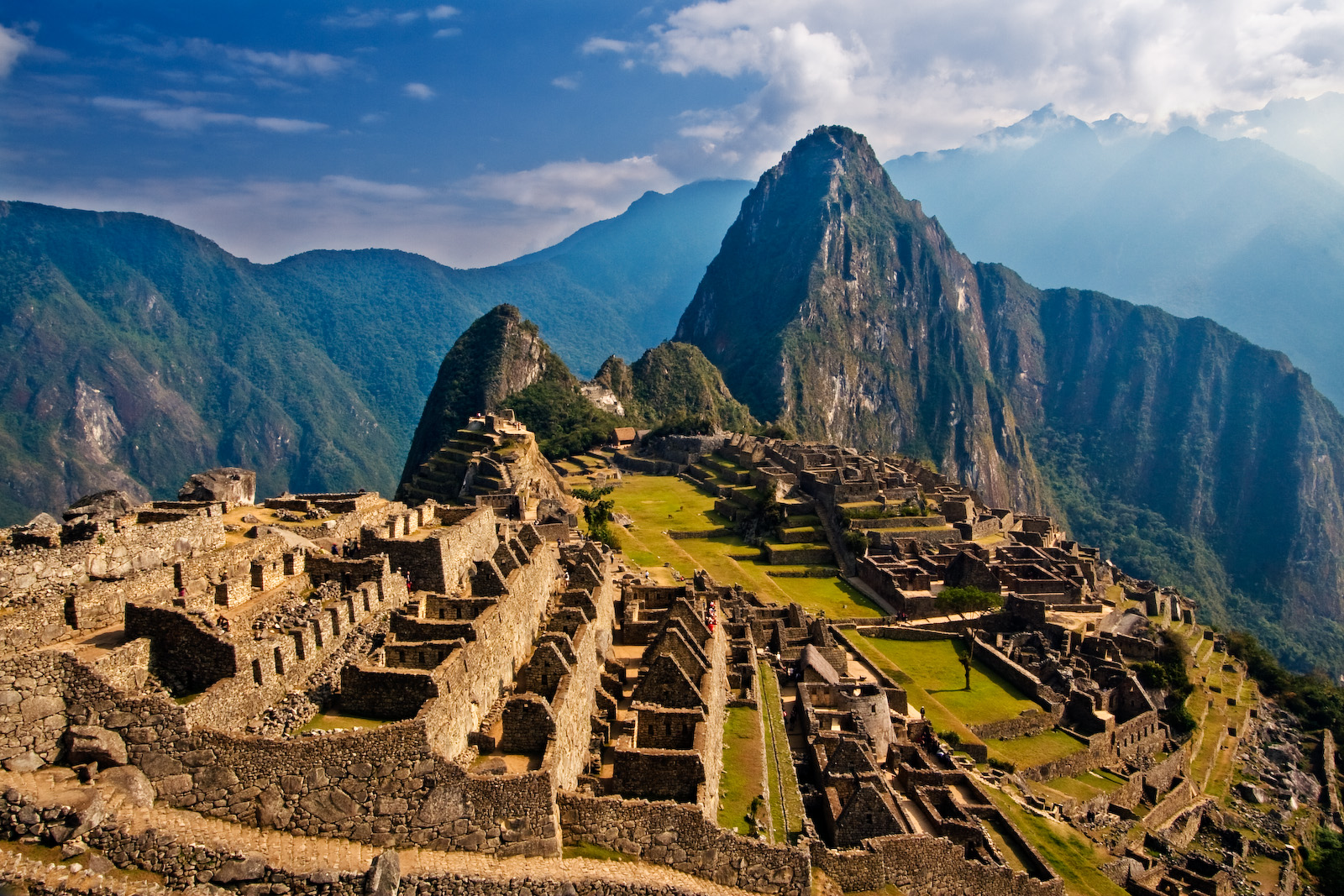
Machu Picchu, Peru, c.1450 AD

Inca architecture originated from the Tiwanaku styles, founded in the 2nd century BCE. The Incas used topography and land materials in their designs, with the capital city of Cuzco still containing many examples. The famous Machu Picchu royal estate is a surviving example, along with Sacsayhuamán and Ollantaytambo. The Incas also developed a road system along the western continent, placing their distinctive architecture along the way, visually asserting their imperial rule along the frontier. Other groups such as the Muisca did not construct grand architecture of stone based materials, but rather made of materials like wood and clay.

== South Asia ==
After the fall of the Indus Valley, South Asian architecture entered the Dharmic period which saw the development of Ancient Indian architectural styles which further developed into various unique forms in the Middle Ages, along with the combination of Islamic styles, and later, other global traditions.

=== Ancient Buddhist ===
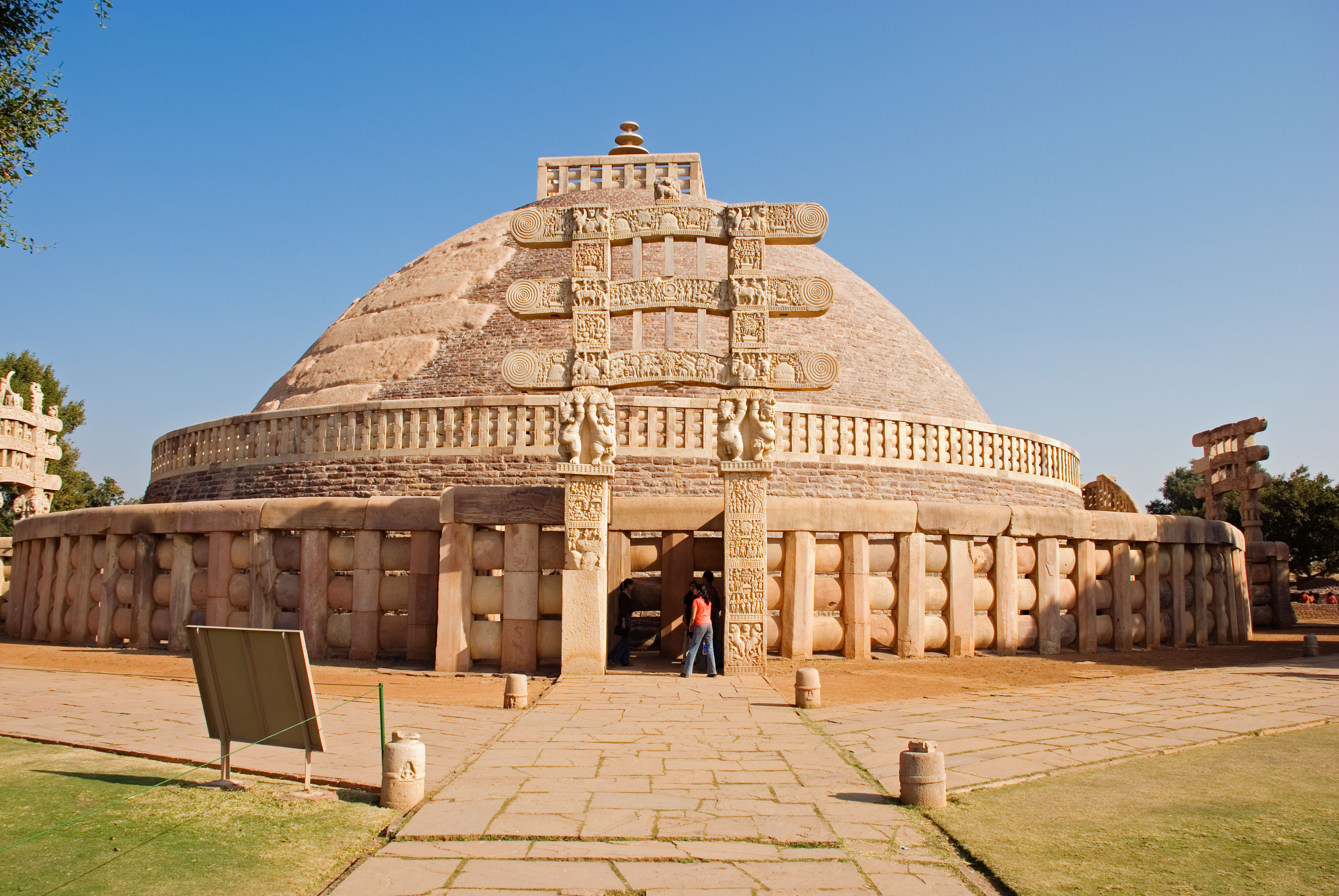
The Great Stupa of Sanchi (Madhya Pradesh, India), unknown architect, 3rd century-c.100 BC

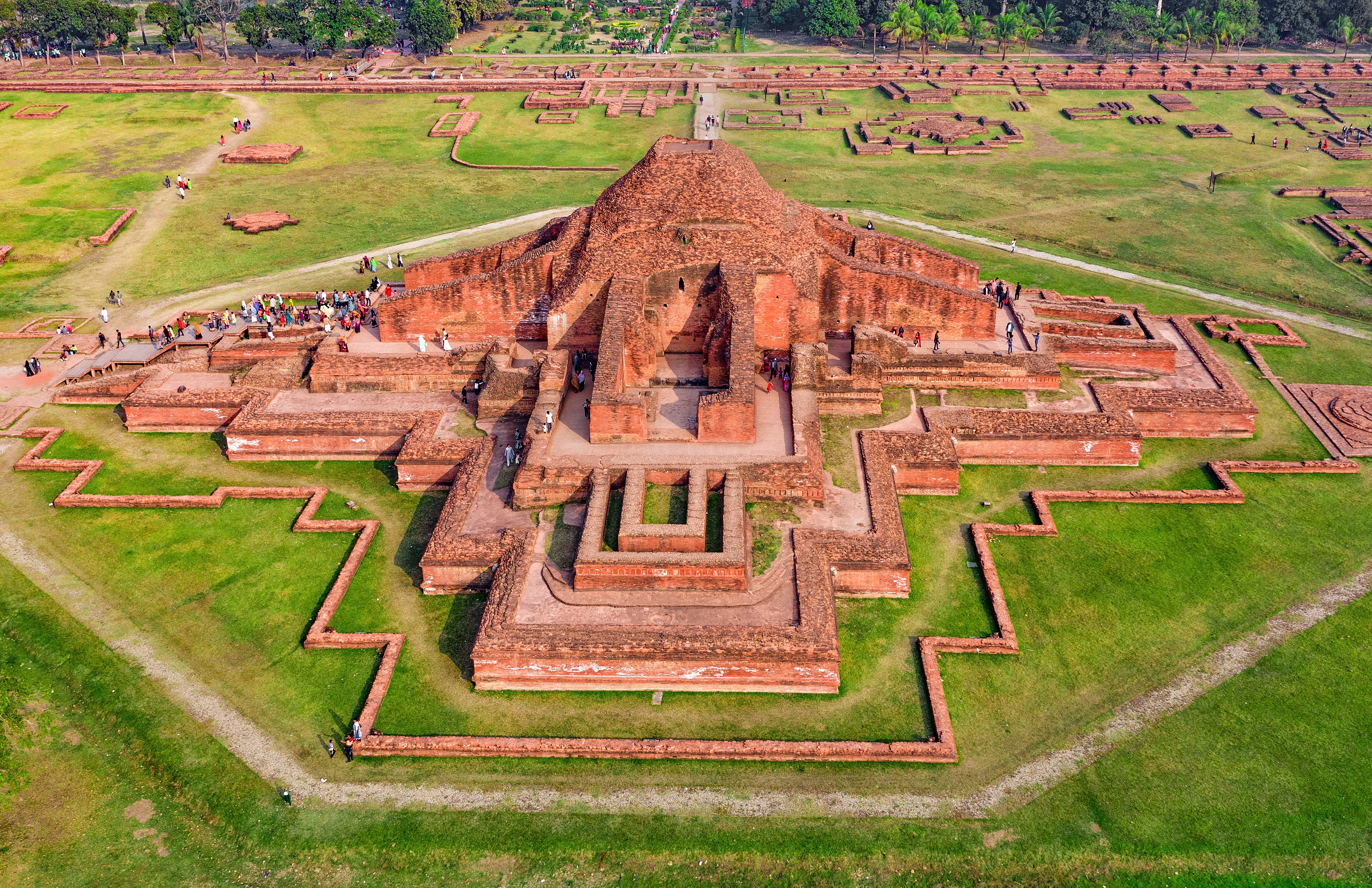
Somapura Mahavihara (Bangladesh), unknown architect, c.8th century AD

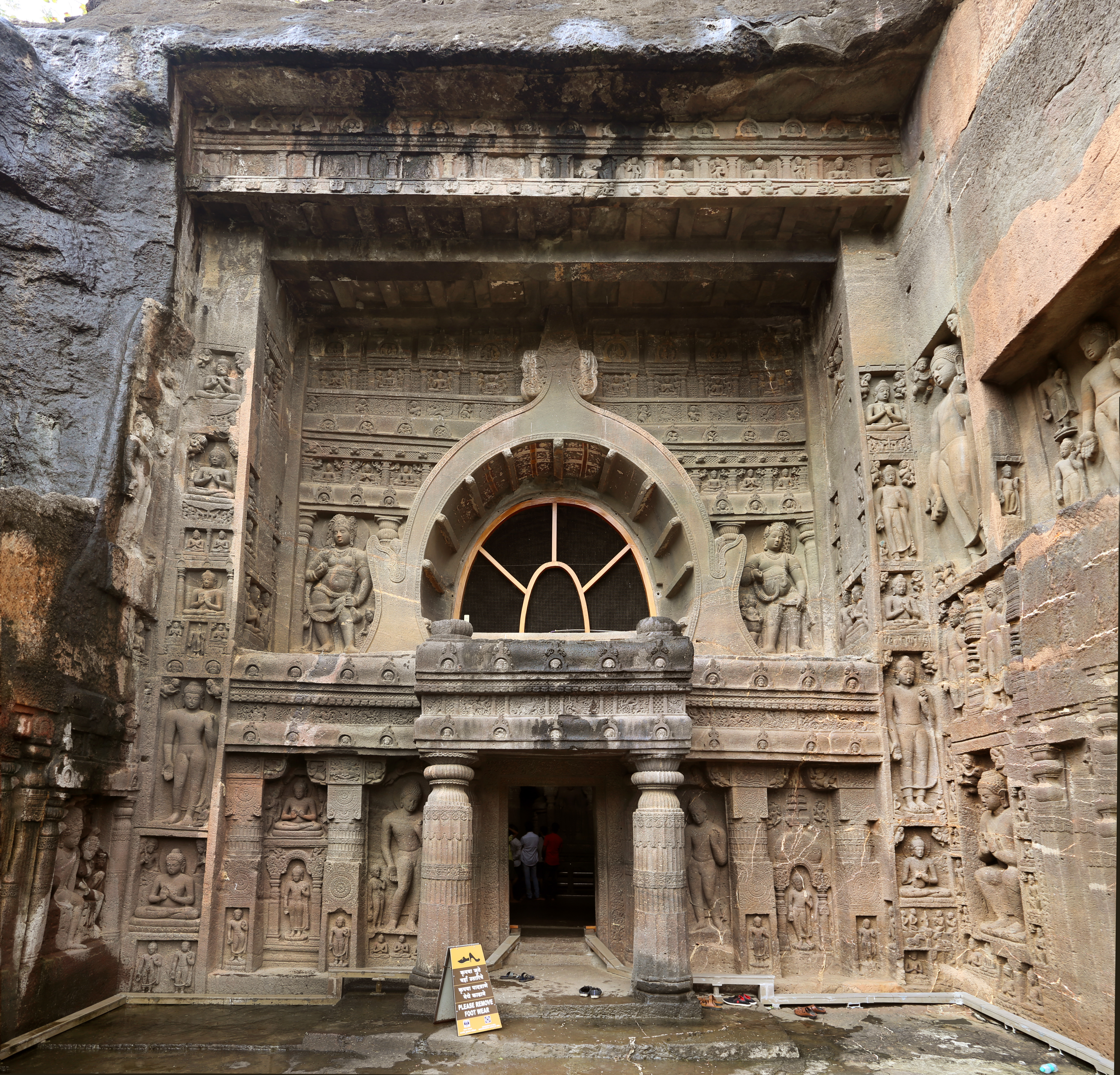
Cave 19 of the Ajanta Caves, Maharashtra, a chaitya hall, and also an example of Indian rock-cut architecture, unknown architect, 5th-century

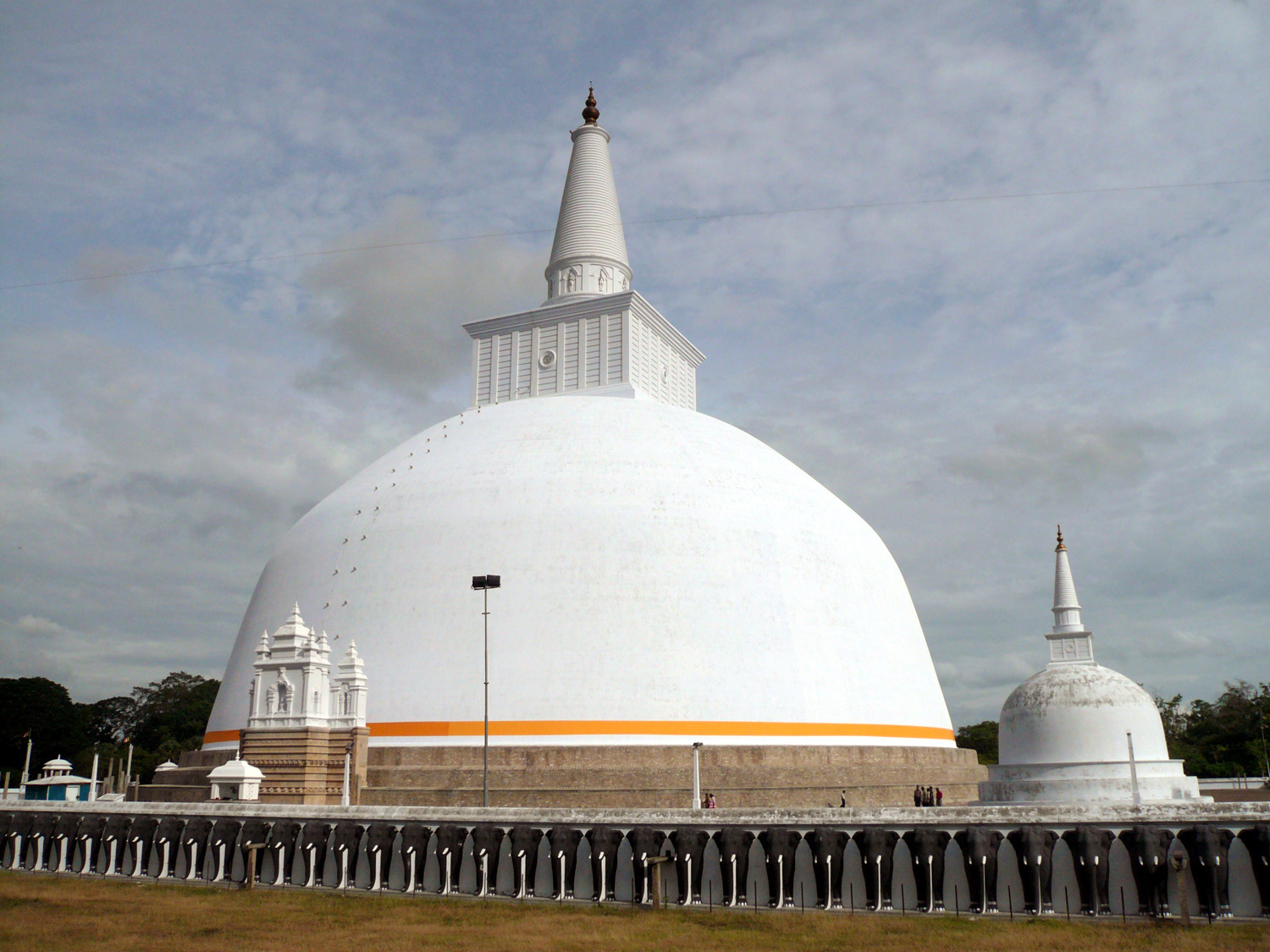
Ruwanwelisaya, Anuradhapura, Sri Lanka, unknown architect, c.140 BC (renovated in the early 20th century)

Buddhist architecture developed in the Indian subcontinent during the 4th and 2nd century BC, and spread first to China and then further across Asia. Three types of structures are associated with the religious architecture of early Buddhism: monasteries (viharas), places to venerate relics (stupas), and shrines or prayer halls (chaityas, also called chaitya grihas), which later came to be called temples in some places. The most iconic Buddhist type of building is the stupa, which consists of a domed structure containing relics, used as a place of meditation to commemorate Buddha. The dome symbolised the infinite space of the sky.

Buddhism had a significant influence on Sri Lankan architecture after its introduction, and ancient Sri Lankan architecture was mainly religious, with over 25 styles of Buddhist monasteries. Monasteries were designed using the Manjusri Vasthu Vidya Sastra, which outlines the layout of the structure.

After the fall of the Gupta empire, Buddhism mainly survived in Bengal under the Palas, and has had a significant impact on pre-Islamic Bengali architecture of that period.

=== Ancient Hindu ===
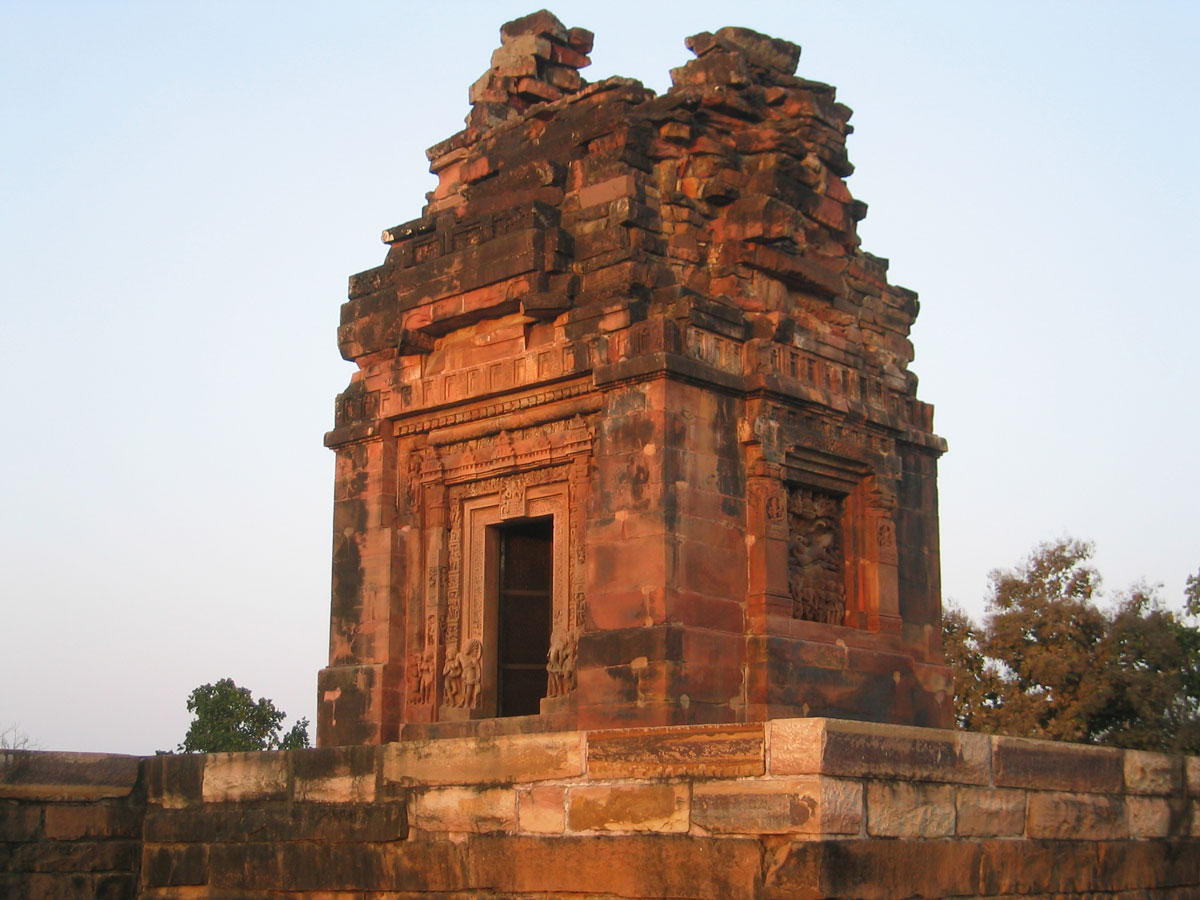
Dashavatara Temple, Deogarh, Uttar Pradesh, unknown architect, c.6th century AD

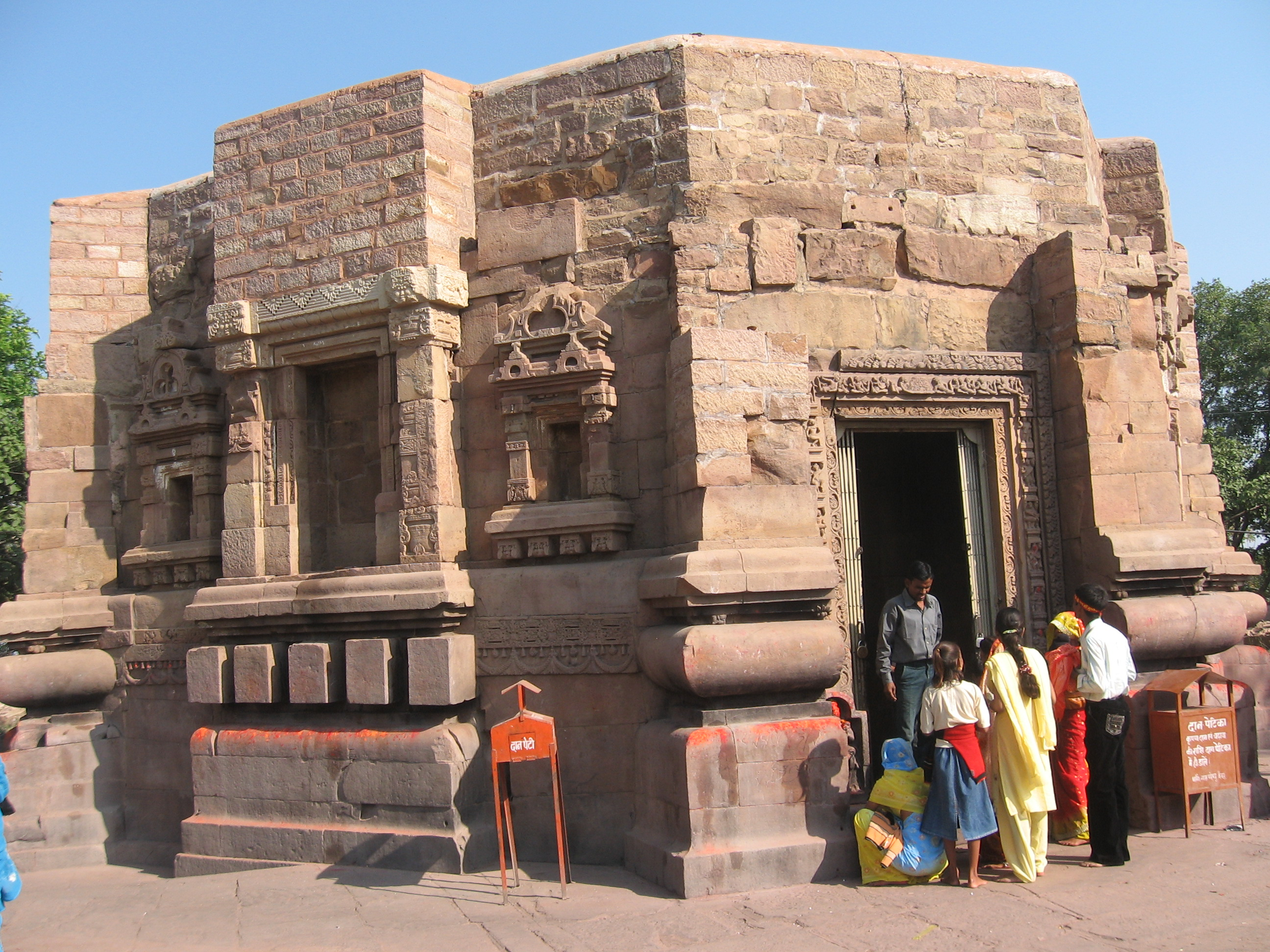
Mundeshwari Temple, Kaimur district, Bihar, unknown architect, c.7th century AD

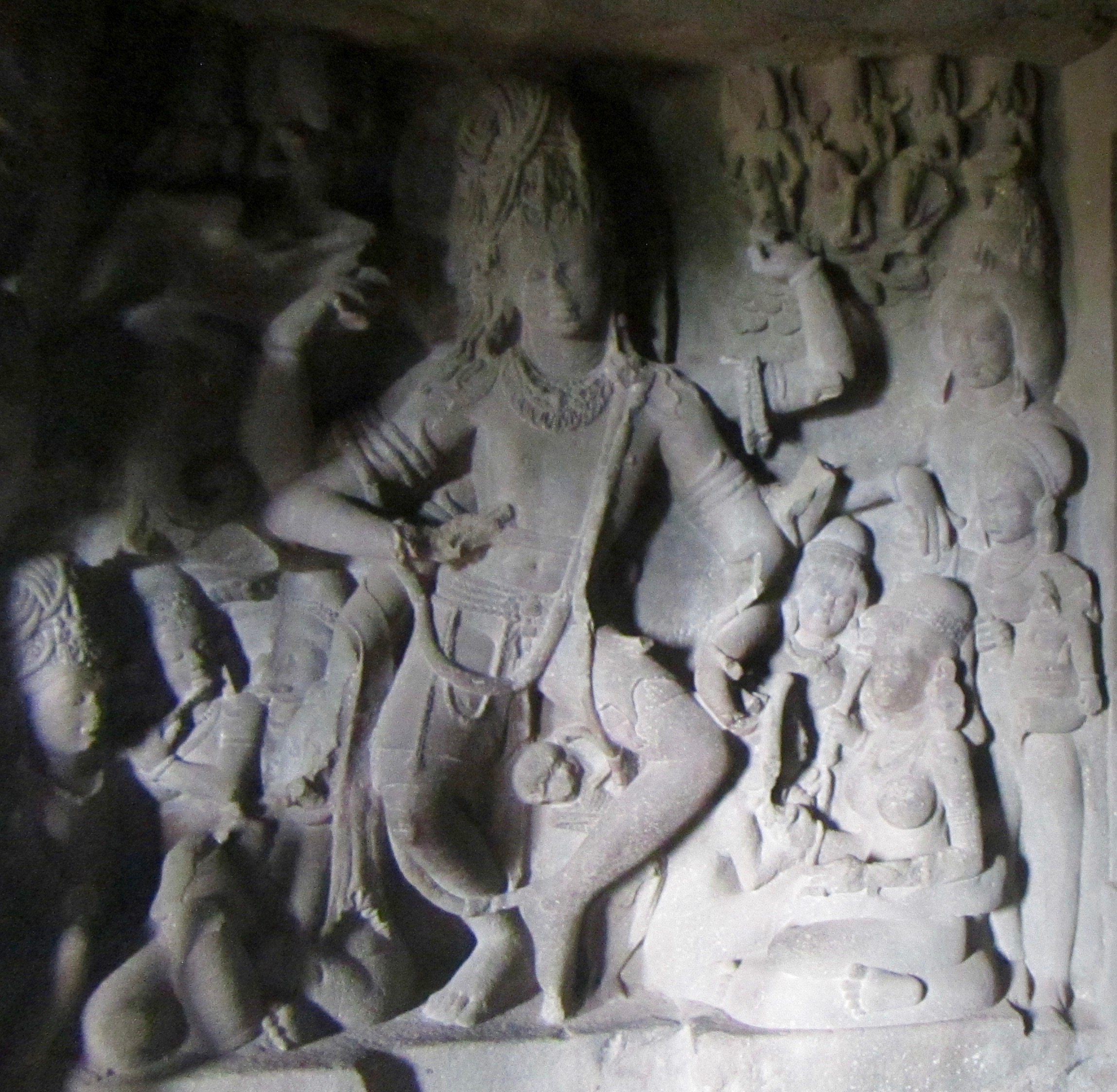
Ellora Caves, Aurangabad district, Maharashtra, unknown architect, c.6th century AD

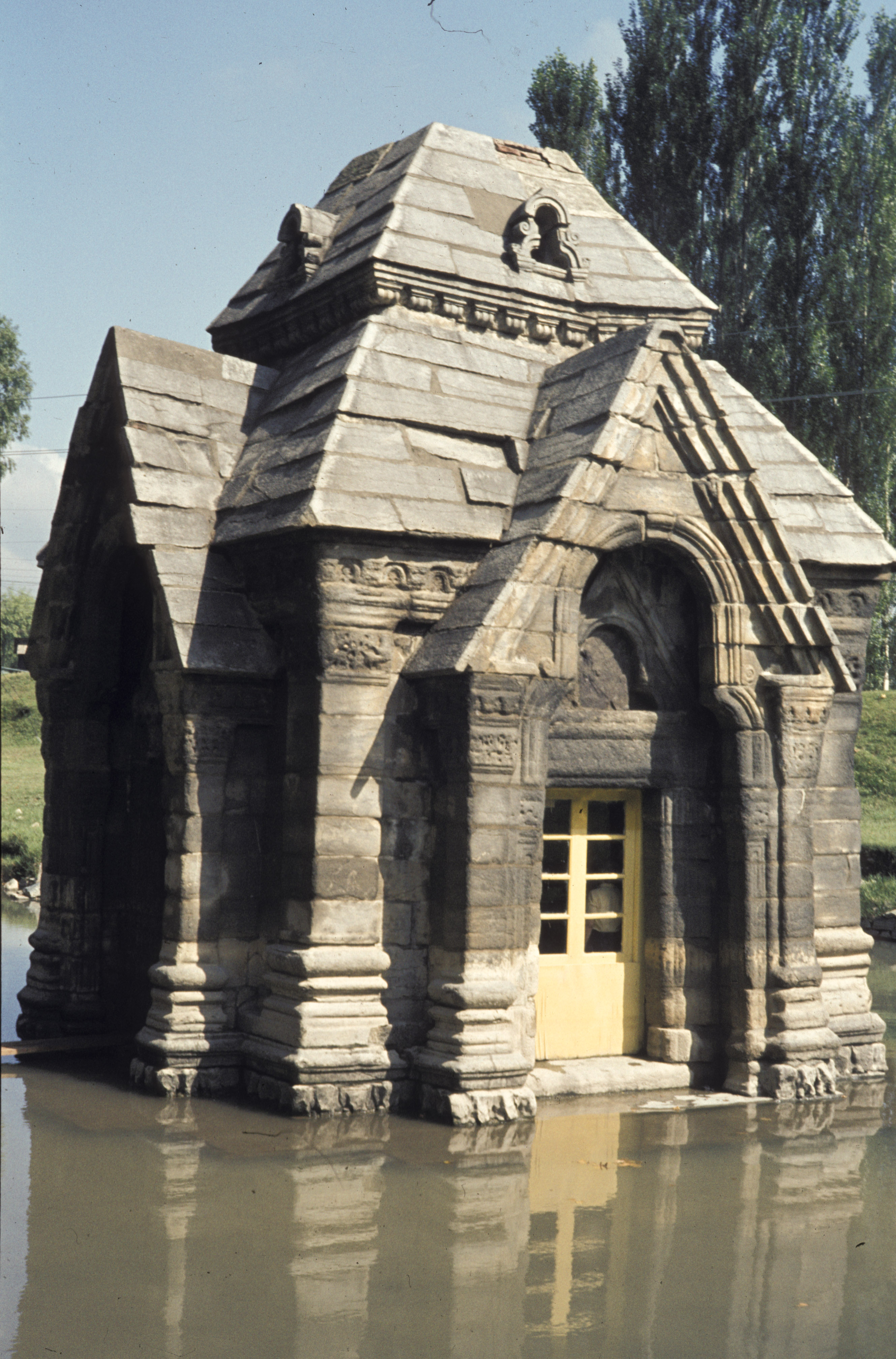
Shiva temple, Pandrethan, Srinagar, Jammu and Kashmir, unknown architect, c. 8th–9th century AD

Across the Indian subcontinent, Hindu architecture evolved from simple rock-cut cave shrines to monumental temples. From the 4th to 5th centuries AD, Hindu temples were adapted to the worship of different deities and regional beliefs, and by the 6th or 7th centuries larger examples had evolved into towering brick or stone-built structures that symbolise the sacred five-peaked Mount Meru. Influenced by early Buddhist stupas, the architecture was not designed for collective worship, but had areas for worshippers to leave offerings and perform rituals.

Many Indian architectural styles for structures such as temples, statues, homes, markets, gardens and planning are as described in Hindu texts. The architectural guidelines survive in Sanskrit manuscripts and in some cases also in other regional languages. These include the Vastu shastras, Shilpa Shastras, the Brihat Samhita, architectural portions of the Puranas and the Agamas, and regional texts such as the Manasara among others.

Since this architectural style emerged in the classical period, it has had a considerable influence on various medieval architectural styles like that of the Gurjaras, Dravidians, Deccan, Odias, Bengalis, and the Assamese.

=== Maru Gurjara ===
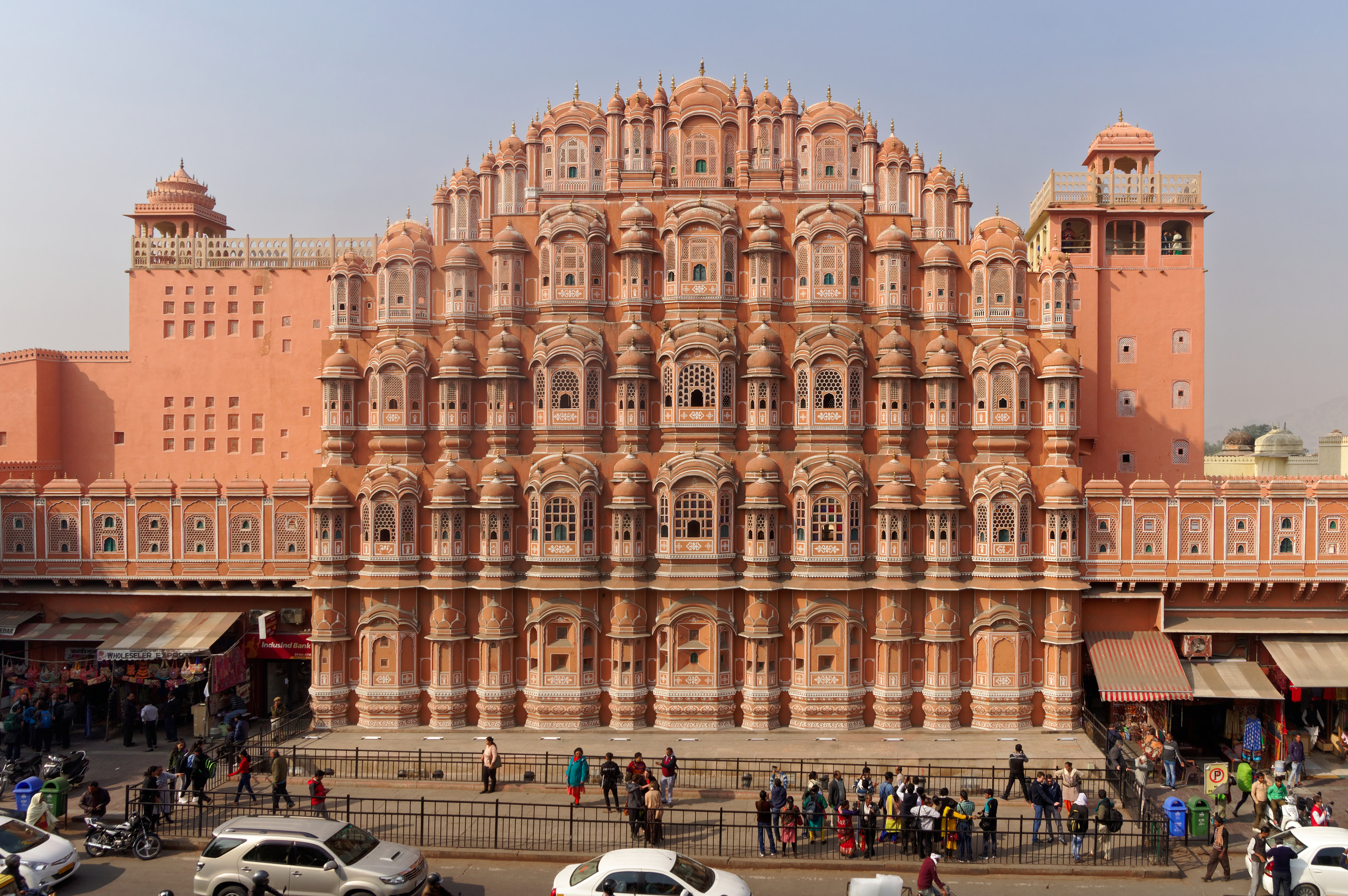
Hawa Mahal, Jaipur, Rajasthan, unknown architect, 1799

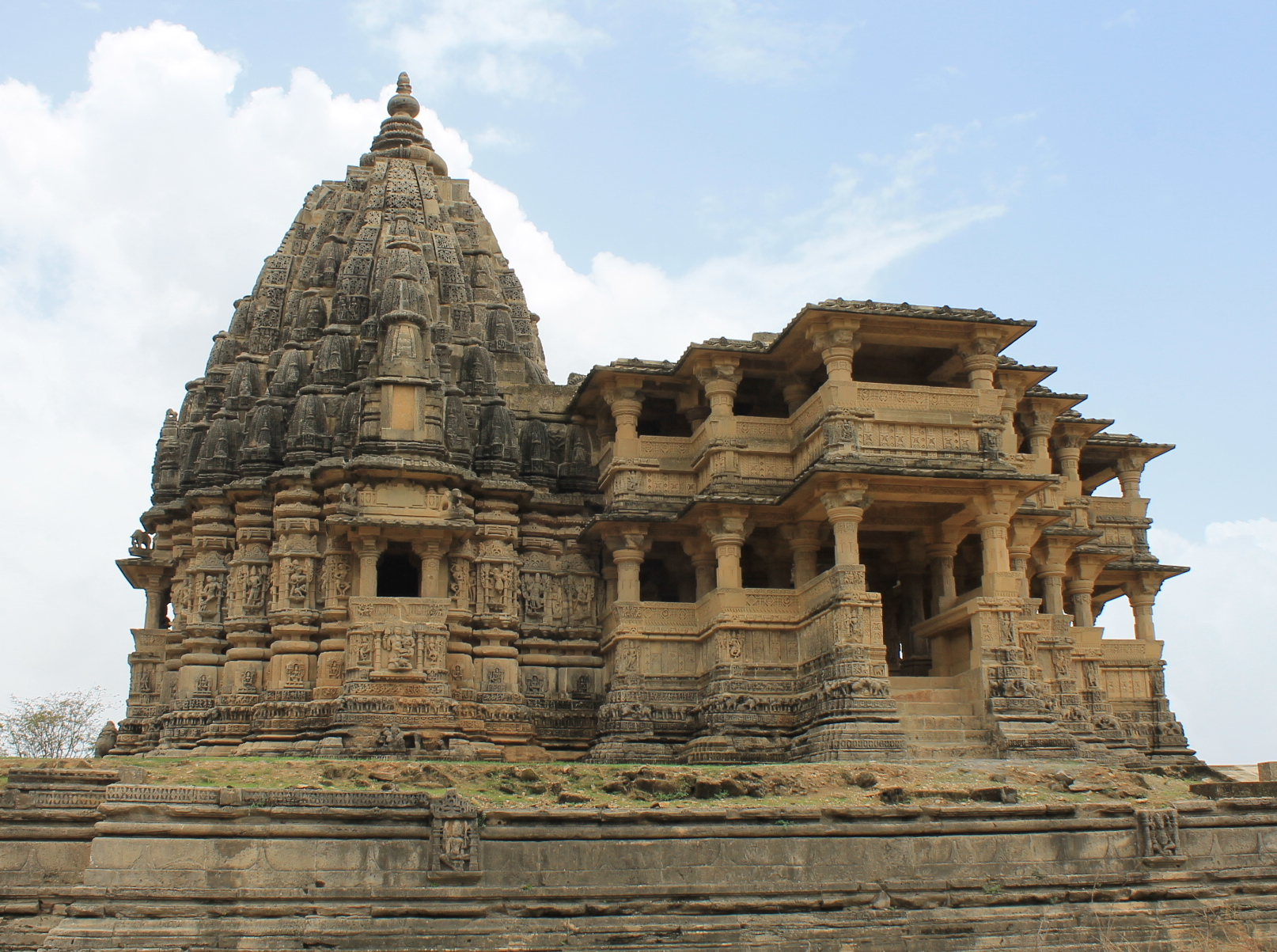
Navlakha Temple, Ghumli, Gujarat, unknown architect, 12th century

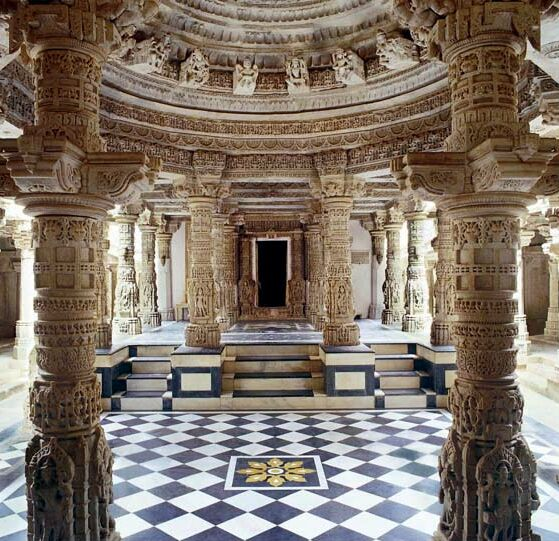
Interior of the Jain Vimal Vasahi Temple, Mount Abu, unknown architect, 1031

This style of North Indian architecture has been observed in Hindu as well as Jain places of worship and congregation. It emerged in the 11th to 13th centuries under the Chaulukya (Solanki) period. It eventually became more popular among the Jain communities who spread it in the greater region and across the world. These structures have the unique features like a large number of projections on external walls with sharply carved statues, and several urushringa spirelets on the main shikhara.

=== Himalayan ===
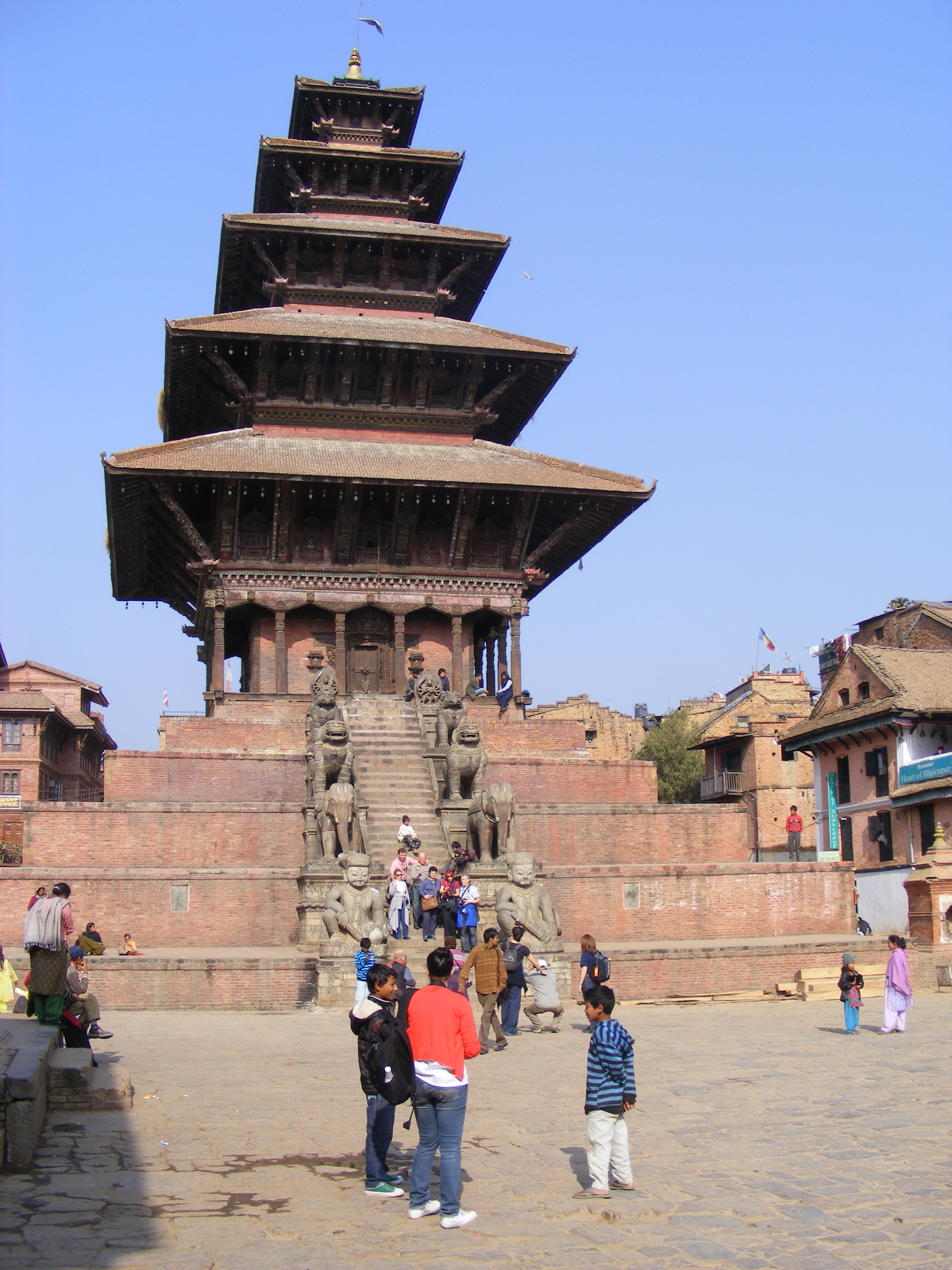
Nyatapola Temple, Bhaktapur, Nepal, unknown architect, 1702

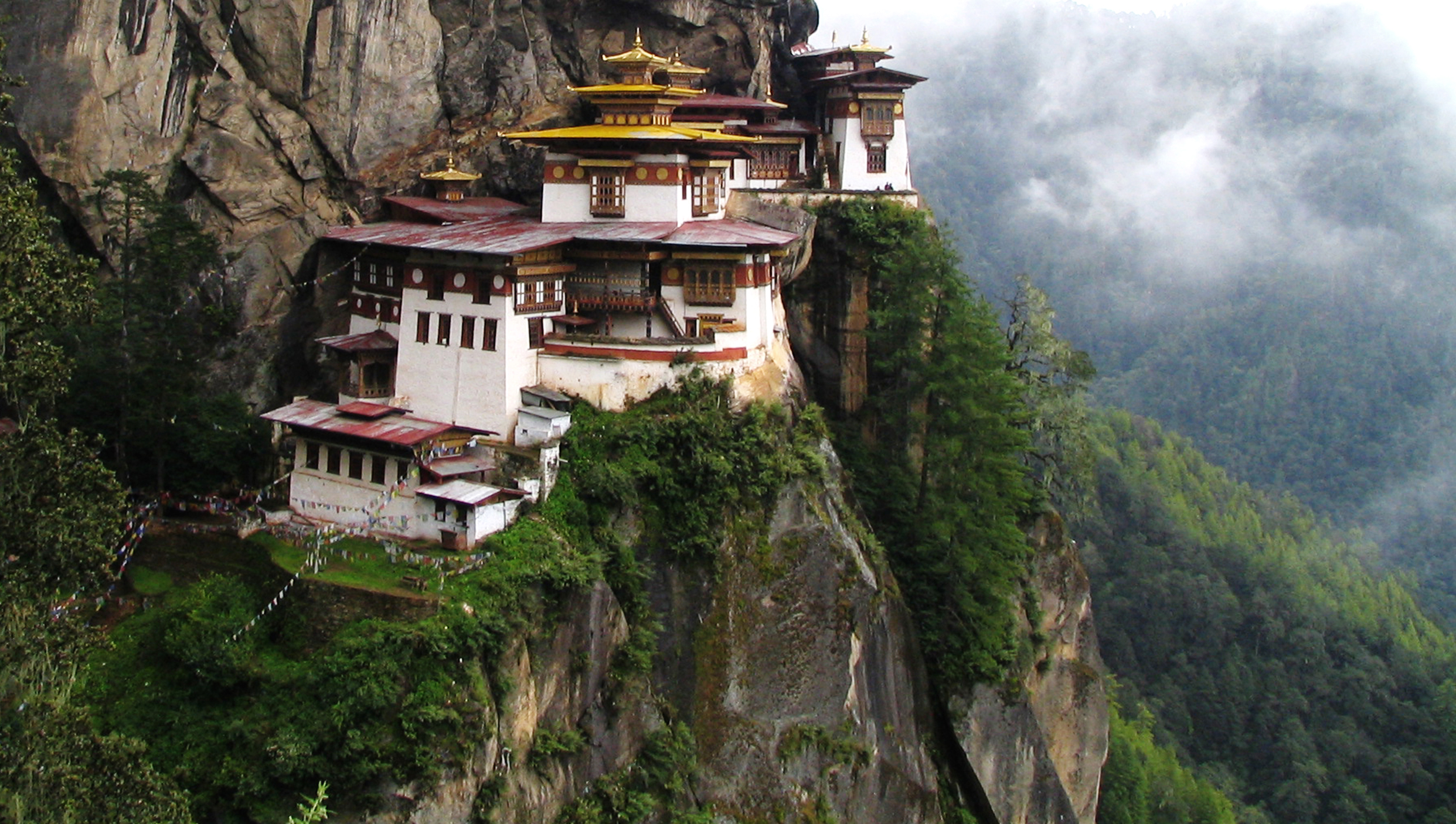
Paro Taktsang, Paro, Bhutan, unknown architect, 1692

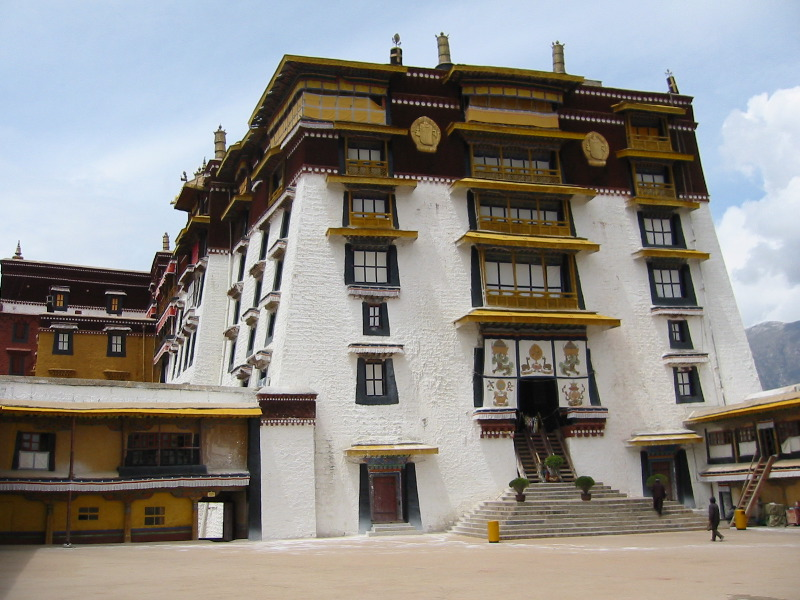
Potala Palace, Lhasa, Tibet, unknown architect, 1649

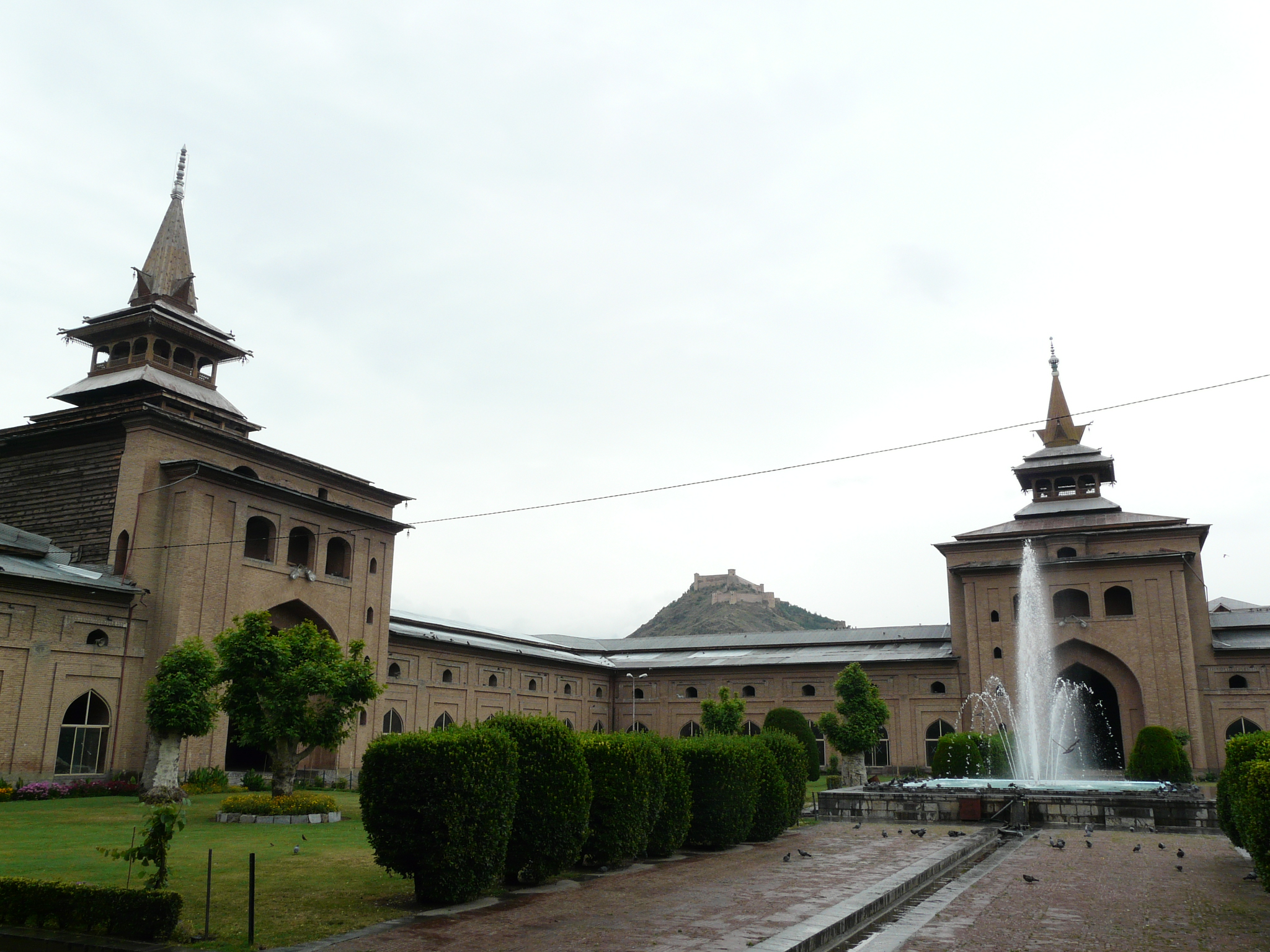
Jamia Masjid, Srinagar, Kashmir, unknown architect, 1394

The Himalayas are inhabited by various people groups including the Paharis, Sino-Tibetans, Kashmiris, and many more groups. Being from different religious and ethnic backgrounds, the architecture has also had multiple influences. Considering the logistical difficulties and slower pace of life in the Himalayas, artisans have that the time to make intricate wood carvings and paintings accompanied by ornamental metal work and stone sculptures that are reflected in religious as well as civic and military buildings. These styles exist in different forms from Tibet and Kashmir to Assam and Nagaland. A common feature is observed in the slanted layered roofs on temples, mosques, and civic buildings.

=== Dravidian ===
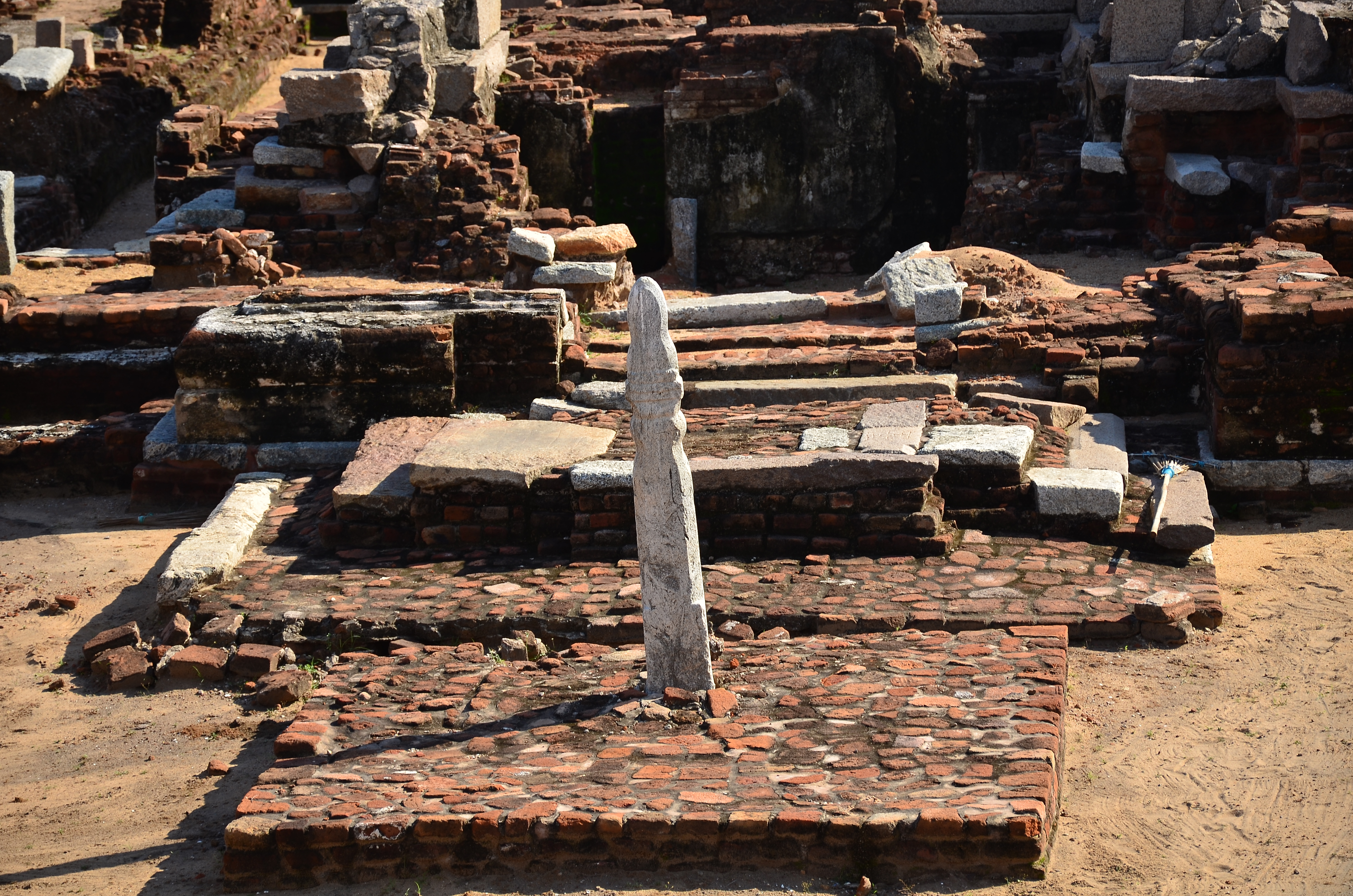
Stone vel on a brick platform at the entrance to the Murugan Temple, Saluvankuppam, unknown architect, 300 BC

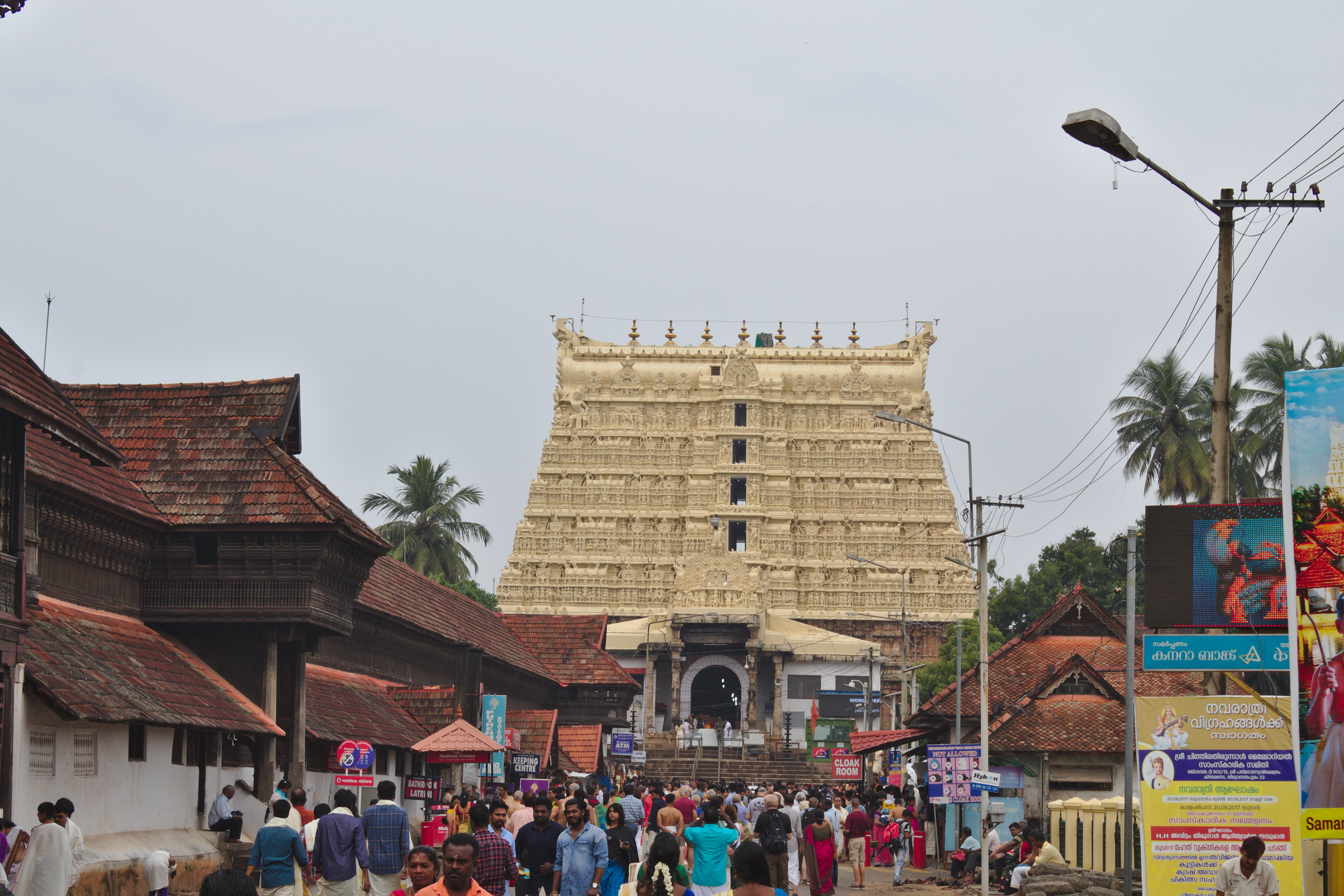
Padmanabhaswamy Temple, Thiruvananthapuram, Kerala, unknown architect, local Dravidian worship site possibly as early as the 4th century AD, Vaishnavite worship site by the 8th century AD, with its gopuram built by the 16th century AD

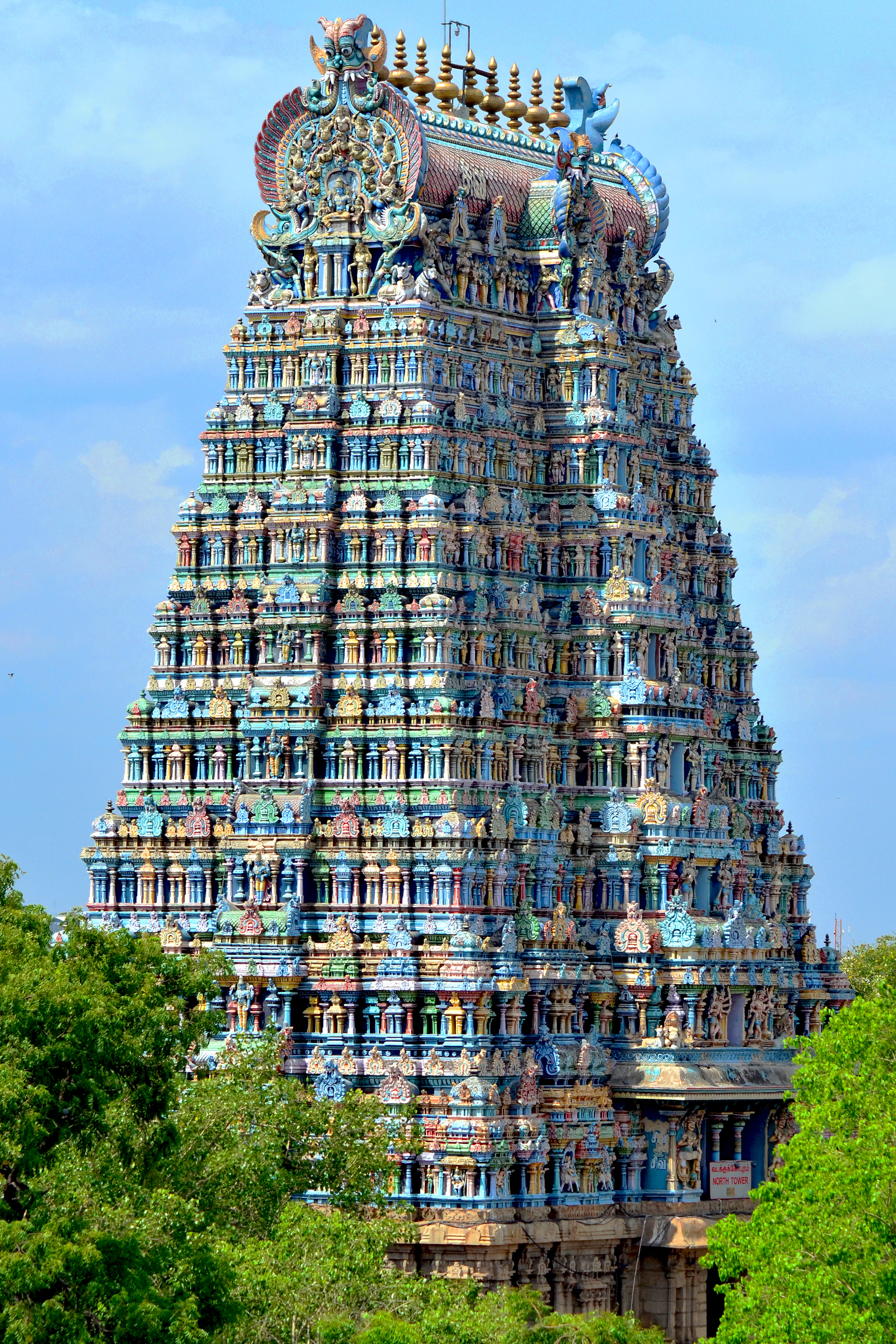
Meenakshi Temple, Madurai, Tamil Nadu, unknown architect, c.12th century

This is an architectural style that emerged in the southern part of the Indian subcontinent and in Sri Lanka. These include Hindu temples with a unique style that involves a shorter pyramidal tower over the garbhagriha or sanctuary called a vimana, where the north has taller towers, usually bending inwards as they rise, called shikharas. These also include secular buildings that may or may not have slanted roofs based on the geographical region. In the Tamil country, this style is influenced by the Sangam period as well as the styles of the great dynasties that ruled it. This style varies in the region to its west in Kerala that is influenced by geographic factors like western trade and the monsoons which result in sloped roofs. Further north, the Karnata Dravida style varies based on the diversity of influences, often relaying much about the artistic trends of the rulers of twelve different dynasties.

=== Kalinga ===
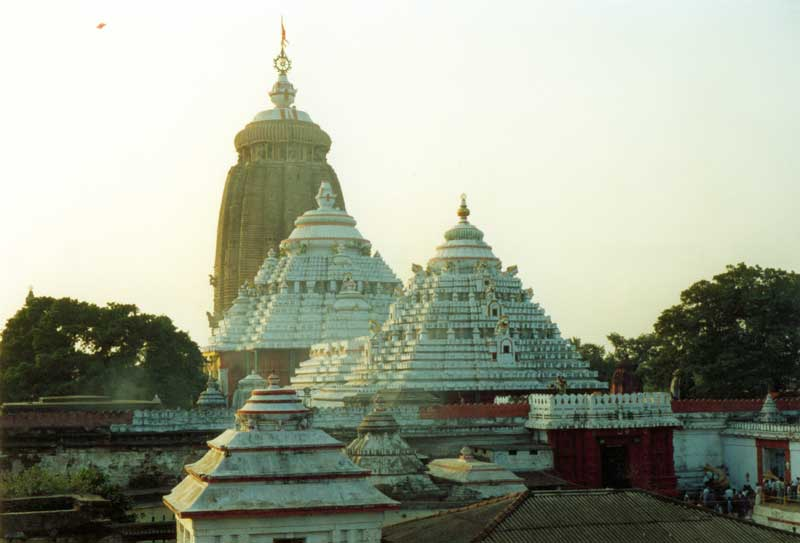
The Jagannath Temple, Puri, Odisha, India, one of the four holiest places (Dhamas) of Hinduism, unknown architect, 12th century

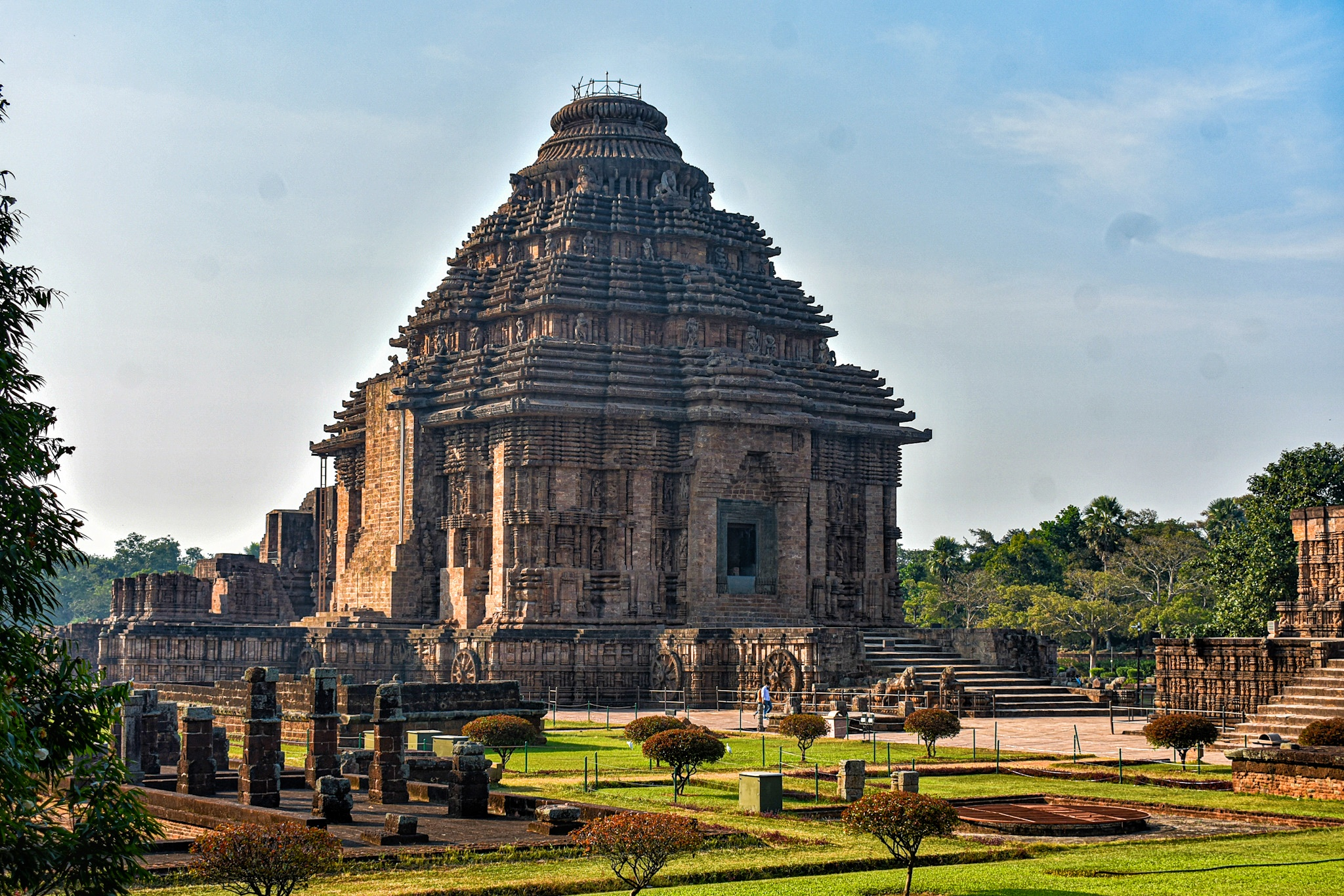
The Konark Sun Temple, Puri, unknown architect, c.1250

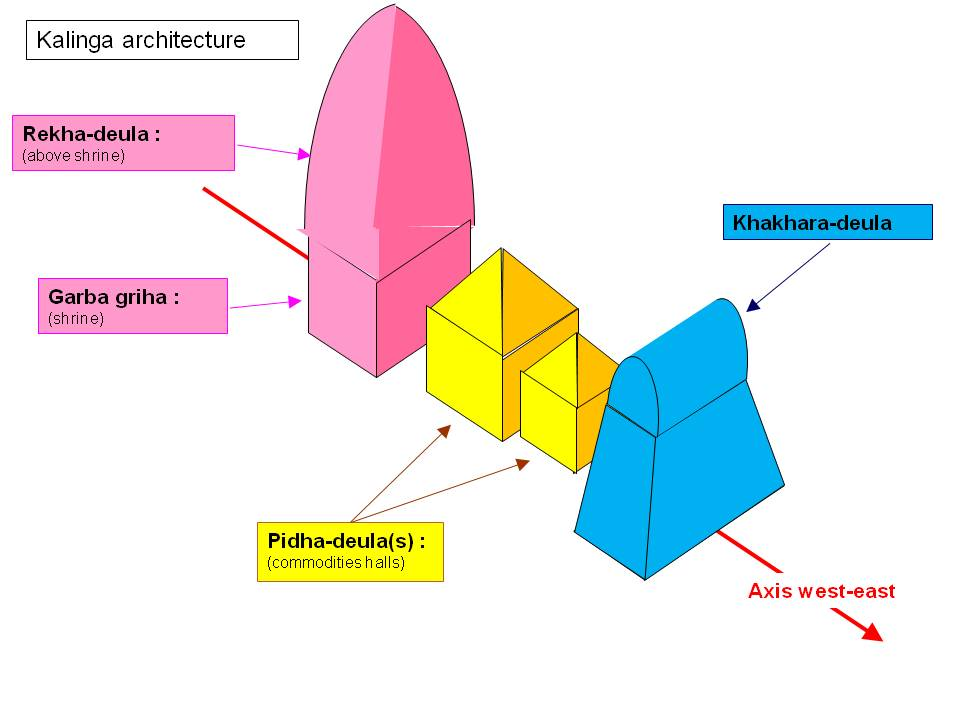
Simplified schema of a Kalinga temple

The ancient Kalinga region corresponds to the present-day eastern Indian areas of Odisha, West Bengal and northern Andhra Pradesh. Its architecture reached a peak between the 9th and 12th centuries under the patronage of the Somavamsi dynasty of Odisha. Lavishly sculpted with hundreds of figures, Kalinga temples usually feature repeating forms such as horseshoes. Within the protective walls of the temple complex are three main buildings with distinctive curved towers called deul or deula and prayer halls called jagmohan.

== East and Southeast Asia ==
Chinese and Confucian culture has had a significant influence on the art and architecture in the Sinosphere (mainly Vietnam, Korea, Japan).

=== China and Vietnam ===
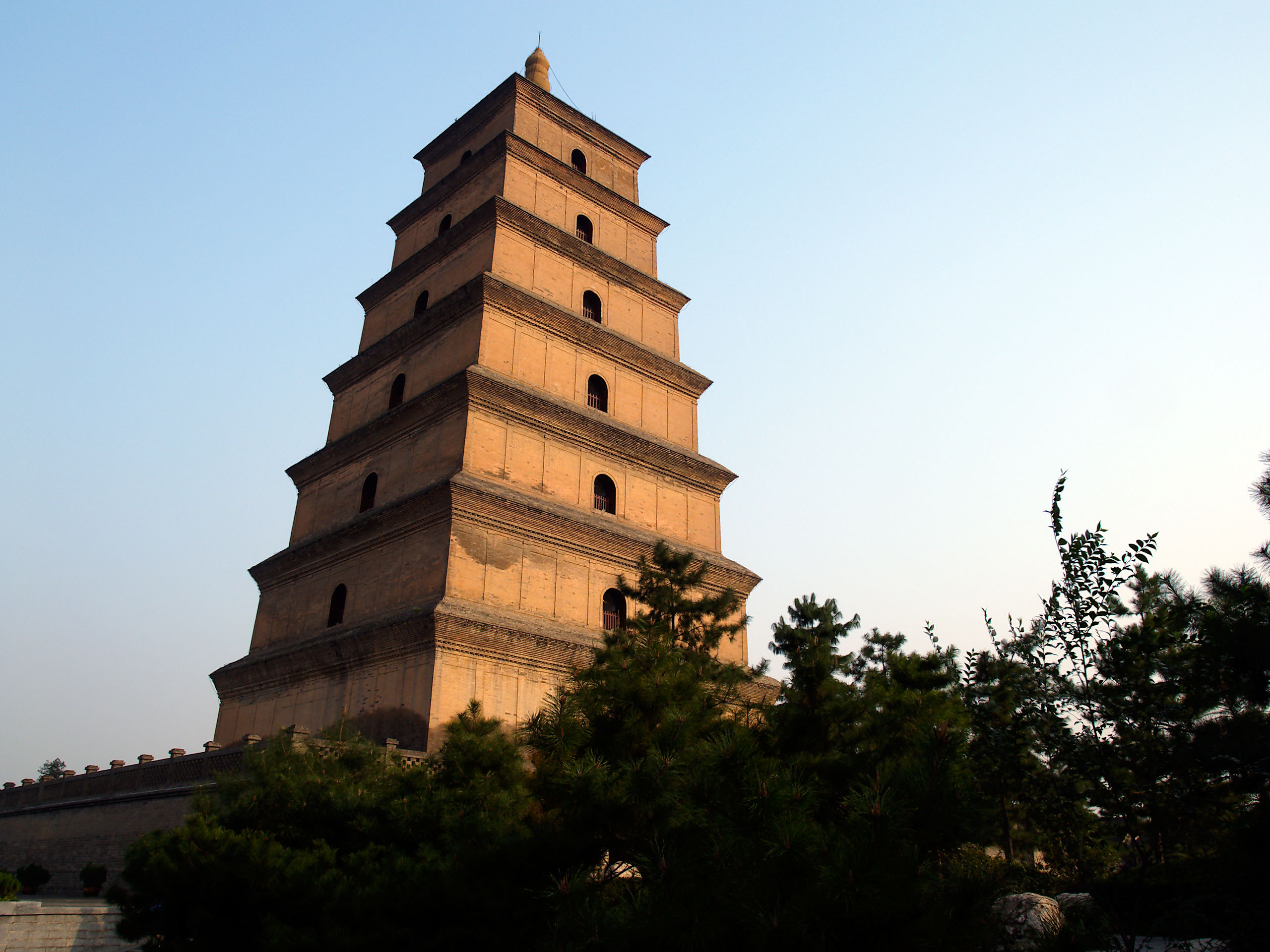
The Giant Wild Goose Pagoda in southern Xi'an, Shaanxi province, China, unknown architect, 652

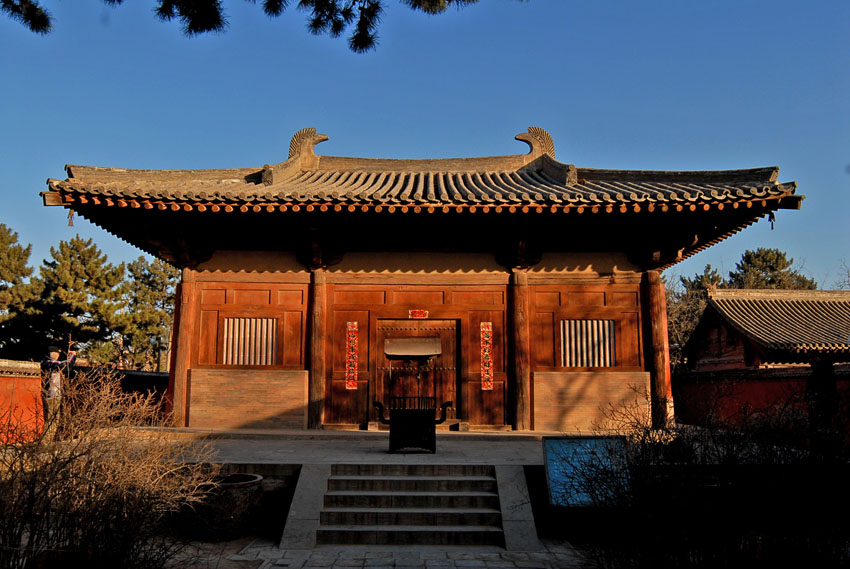
The main hall of the Nanchan Monastery, Wutai, Xinzhou, Shanxi, China, unknown architect, renovated in 782

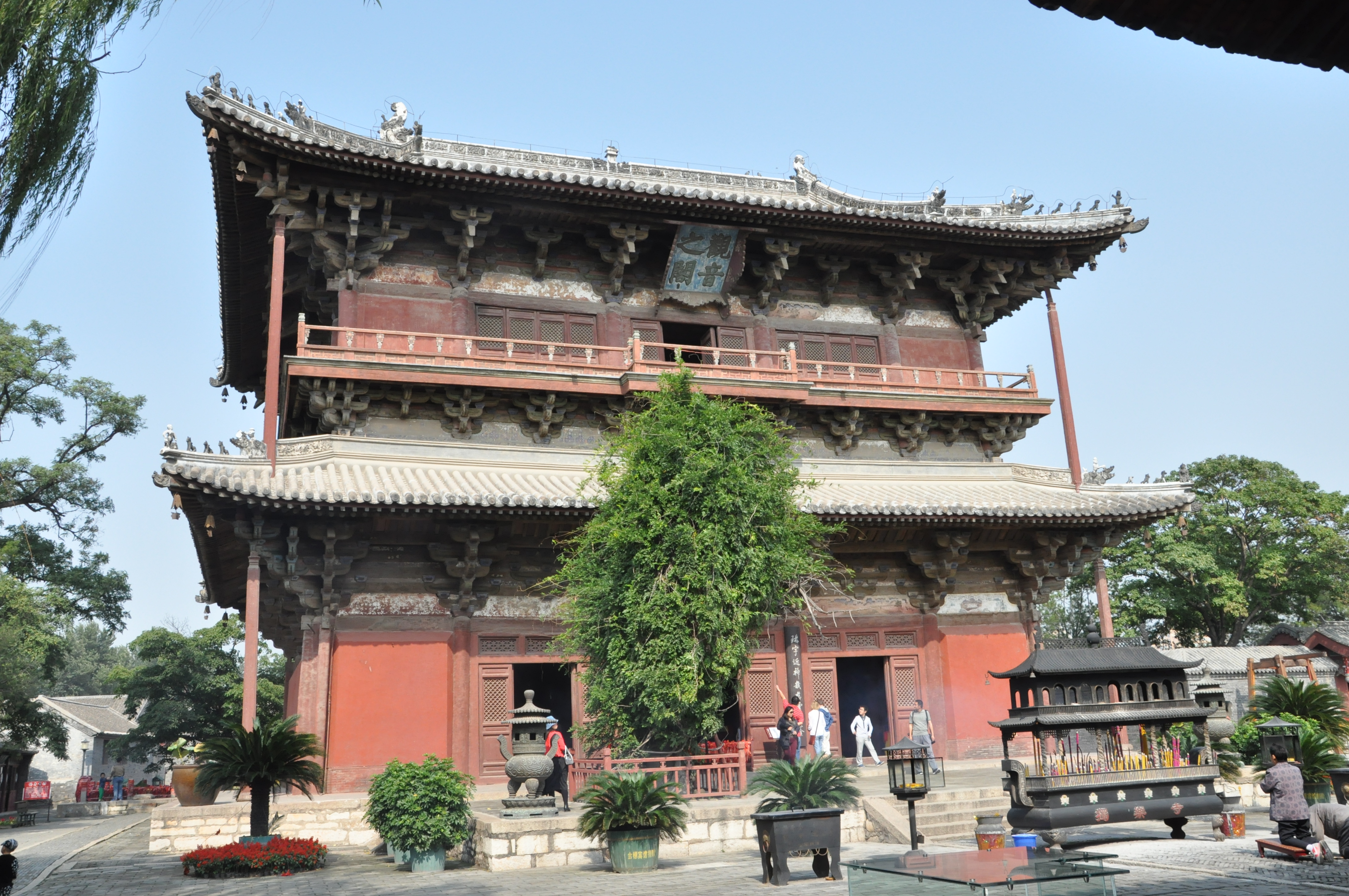
The Guanyian Pavilion of the Dule Monastery, Jixian, China, unknown architect, 984

Hall of Prayer for Good Harvests, the main building of the Temple of Heaven, Beijing, unknown architect, 1703–1790

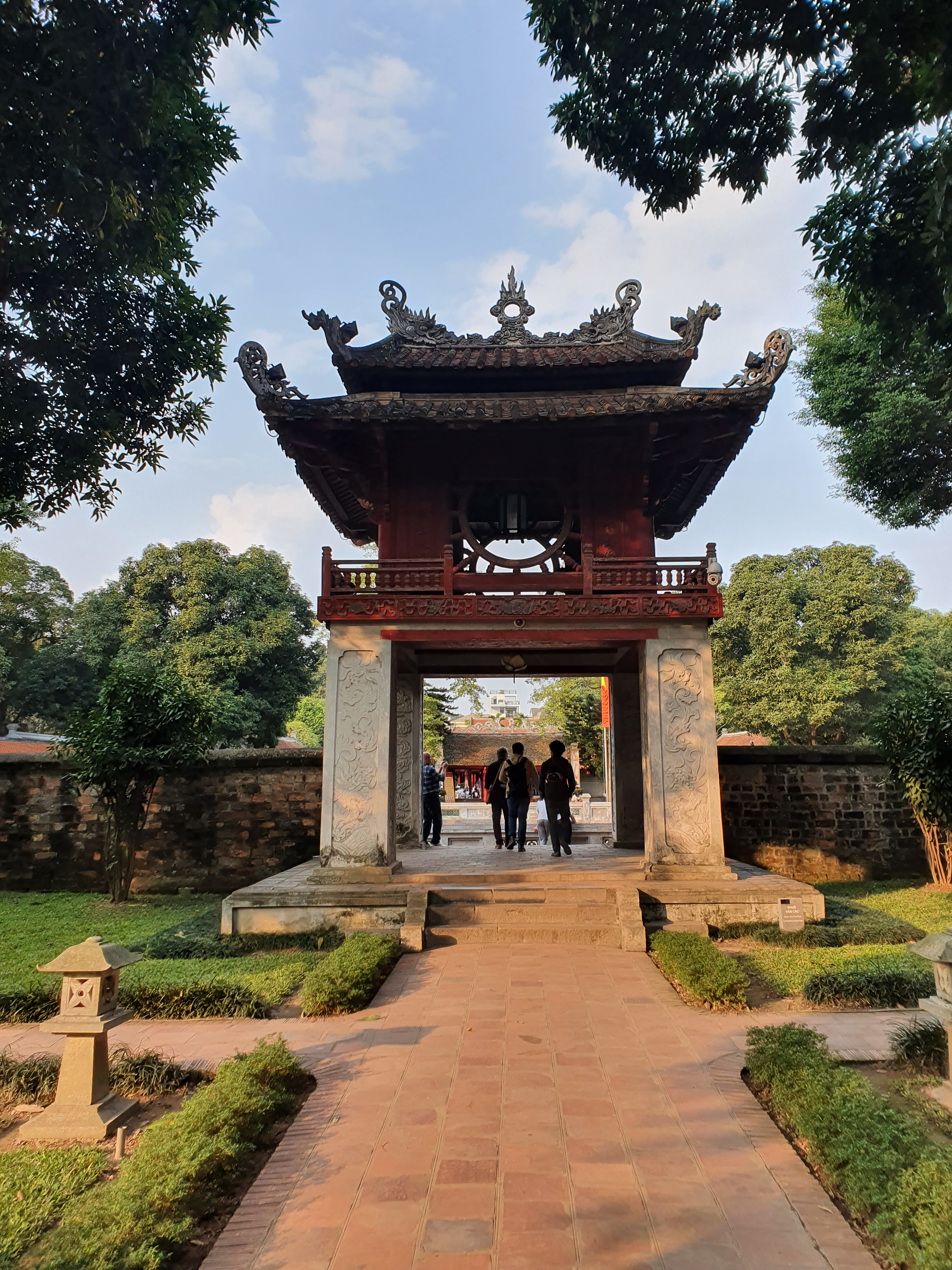
Temple of Literature, Hanoi, Vietnam, unknown architect, 1070

What is recognised today as Chinese culture has its roots in the Neolithic period (10,000–2000 BC), covering the cultural sites of Yangshao, Longshan, and Liangzhu in central China. Sections of present-day north-east China also contain sites of the Neolithic Hongshan culture that manifested aspects of proto-Chinese culture. Native Chinese belief systems included naturalistic, animistic and hero worship. In general, open-air platforms (tan, or altar) were used for worshipping naturalistic deities, such as the gods of wind and earth, whereas formal buildings (miao, or temple) were for heroes and deceased ancestors.

Most early buildings in China were timber structures. Columns with sets of brackets on the face of the buildings, mostly in even numbers, made the central intercolumnal space the largest interior opening. Heavily tiled roofs sat squarely on the timber building with walls constructed in brick or pounded earth.

The transmission of Buddhism into China around the 1st century AD led to a new era of religious practices, and so to new building types. Places of worship in form of cave temples appeared in China, based on Indian rock-cut ones. Another new building type introduced by Buddhism was the Chinese form of stupa (ta) or pagoda. In India, stupas were erected to commemorate well-known people or teachers: consequently, the Buddhist tradition adapted the structure to remember the great teacher, the Buddha. The Chinese pagoda shared a similar symbolism with the Indian stupa and was built with sponsorship mainly from imperial patrons who hoped to gain earthly merits for the next life. Buddhism reached its peak from the 6th to the 8th centuries when there was an unprecedented number of monasteries throughout China. More than 4,600 official and 40,000 unofficial monasteries were built. They varies in size by the number of cloisters they contained, ranging from 6 to 120. Each cloister consisted of a main stand-alone building – a hall, pagoda of pavilion – and was surrounded by a covered corridor in a rectangular compounded served by a gate building.

=== Japan and Korea ===
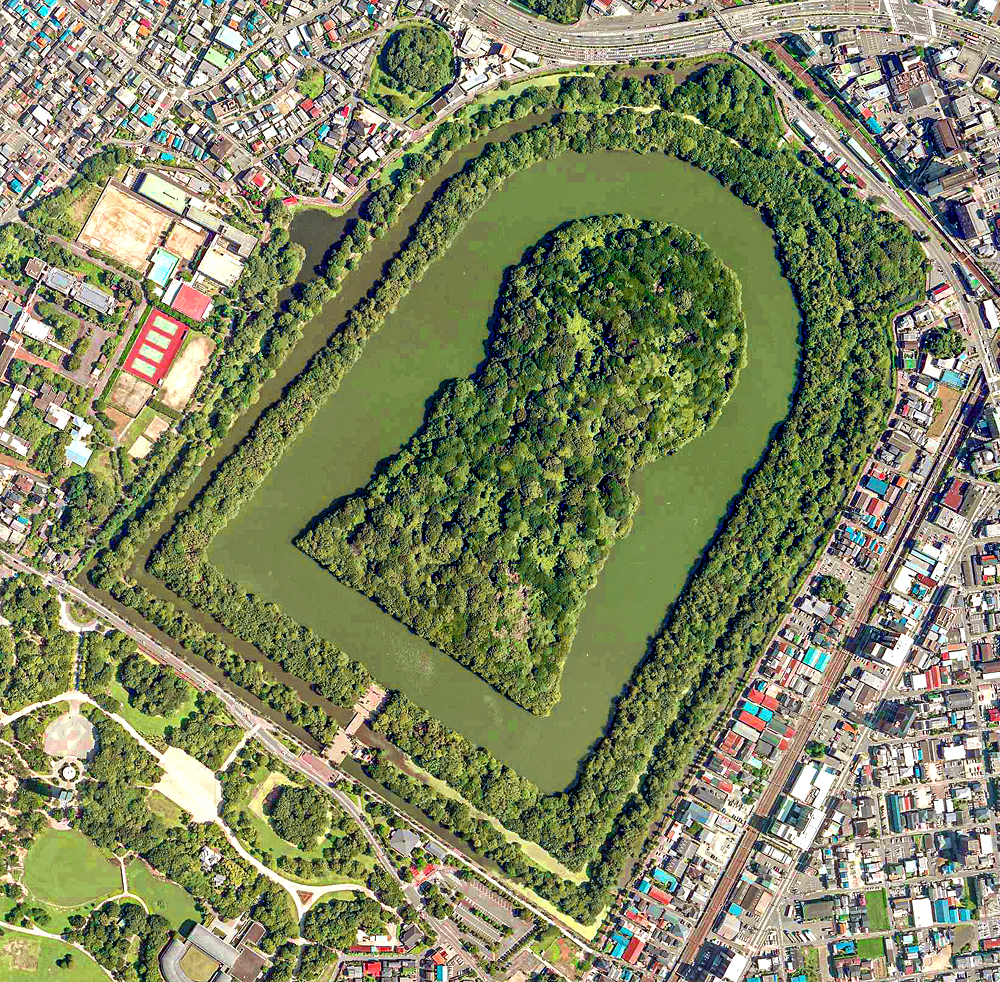
Mausoleum of Emperor Nintoku, Sakai, Osaka Prefecture, Japan, unknown architect, 4th century

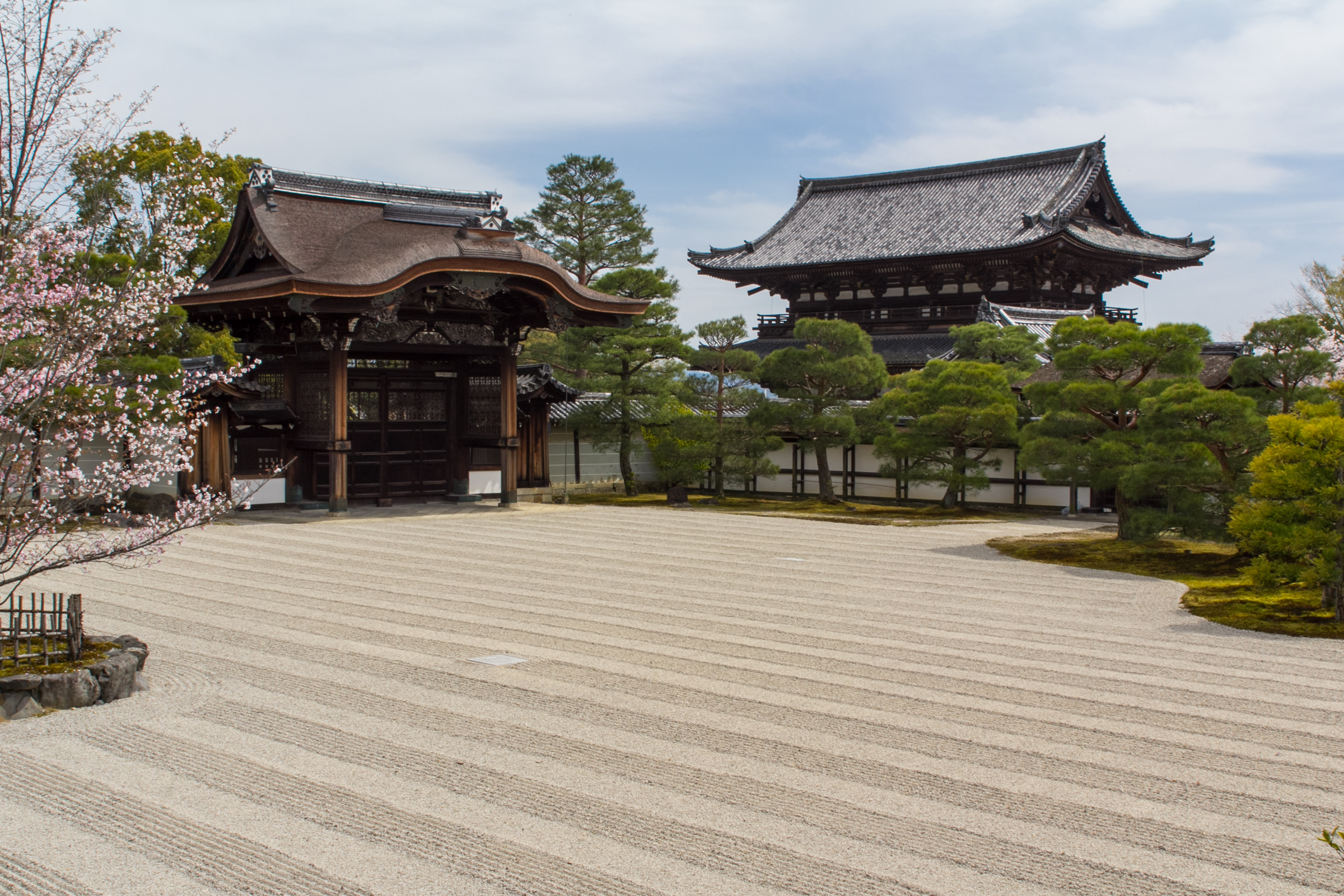
The garden of the Ninna-ji temple in Kyoto, Kyoto Prefecture, an example of a Japanese garden, unknown architect, 888

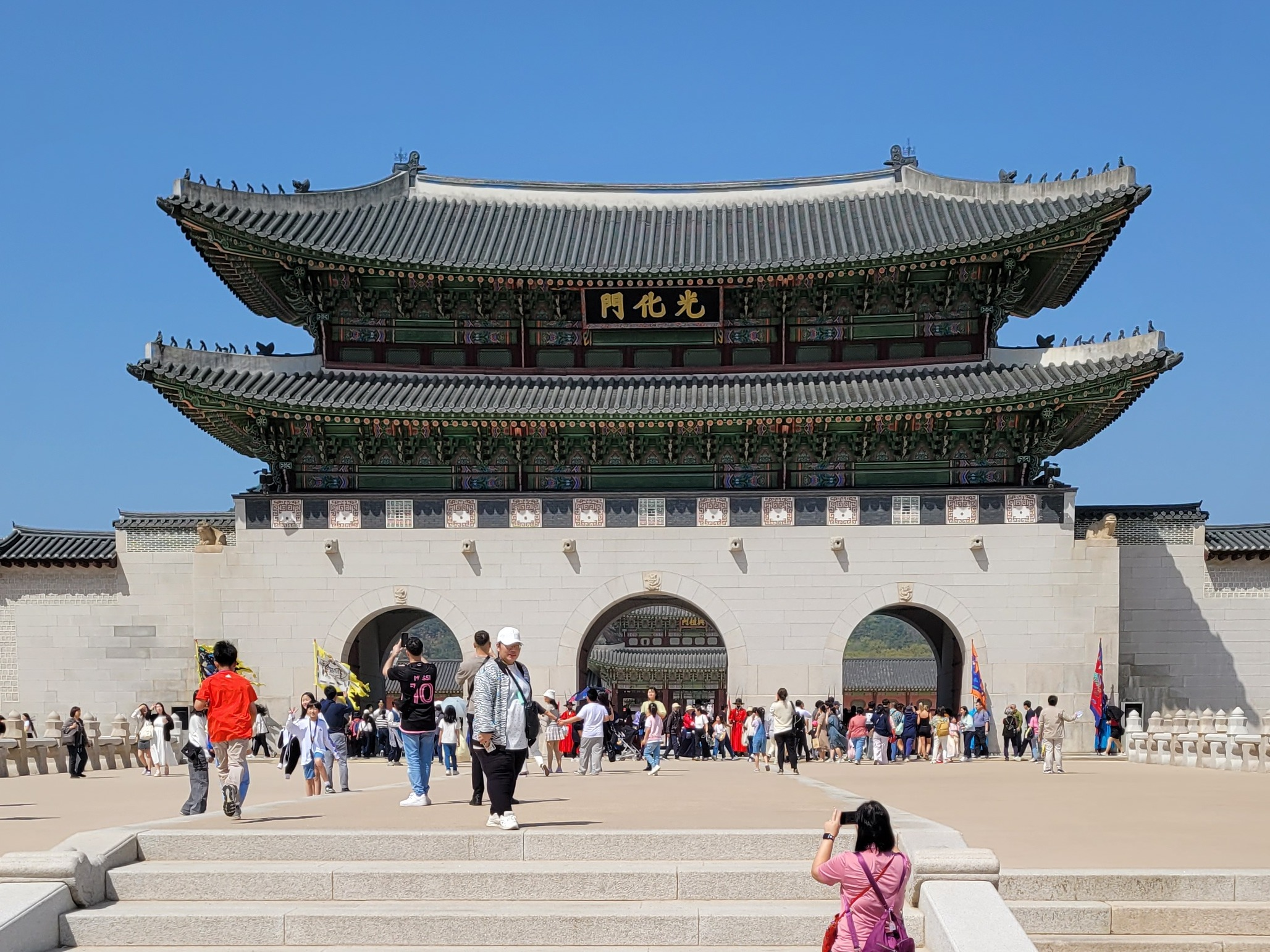
Gyeongbokgung Palace, Seoul, South Korea, unknown architect, 1395

Gyeonghoeru of Gyeongbokgung Palace, unknown architect, 1412

Korean architecture, especially post Joseon period showcases Ming-Qing influences.

Traditionally, Japanese architecture was made of wood and fusuma (sliding doors) in place of walls, allowing internal space to be altered to suit different purposes. The introduction of Buddhism in the mid 6th century, via the neighbouring Korean kingdom of Paekche, initiated large-scale wooden temple building with an emphasis on simplicity, and much of the architecture was imported from China and other Asian cultures. By the end of this century, Japan was constructing Continental-style monasteries, notably the temple, known as Horyu-ji in Ikaruga. In contrast with Western architecture, Japanese structures rarely use stone, except for specific elements such as foundations. Walls are light, thin, never load-bearing and often movable.

=== Khmer ===
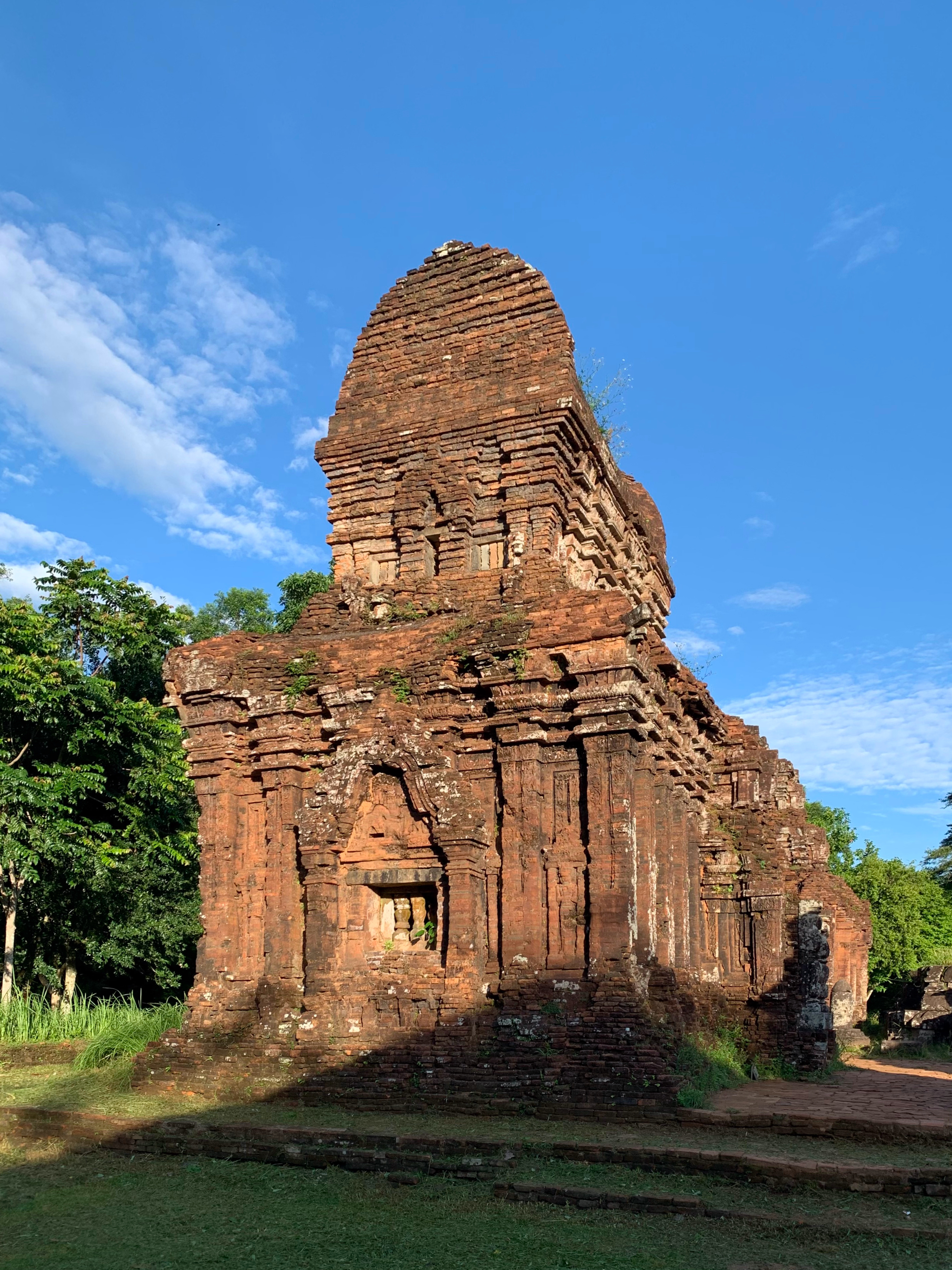
Champa Temples, Mỹ Sơn, Vietnam, unknown architect, c. 4th century

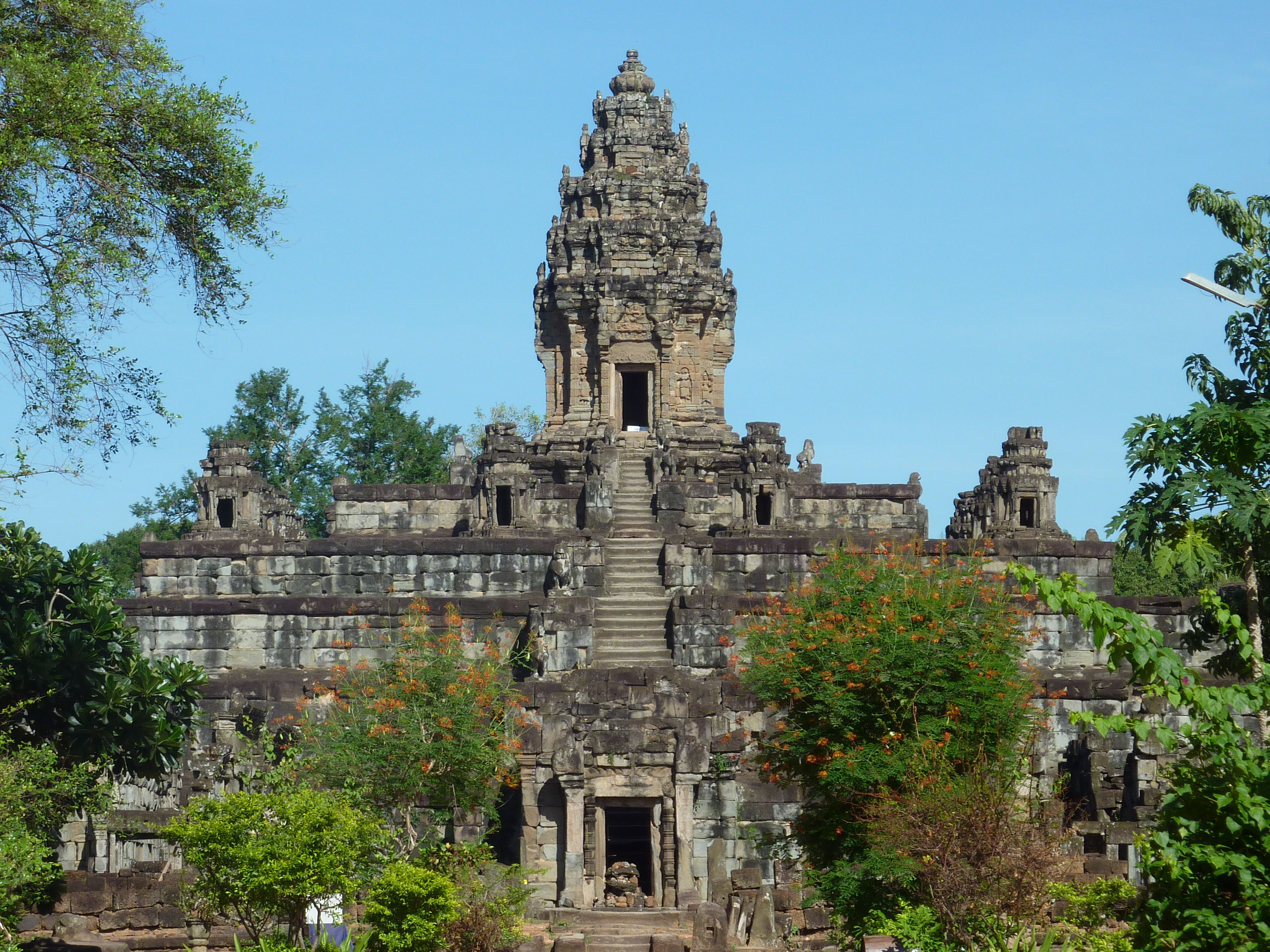
Bakong, Hariharalaya, Roluos, Cambodia, unknown architect, 9th century

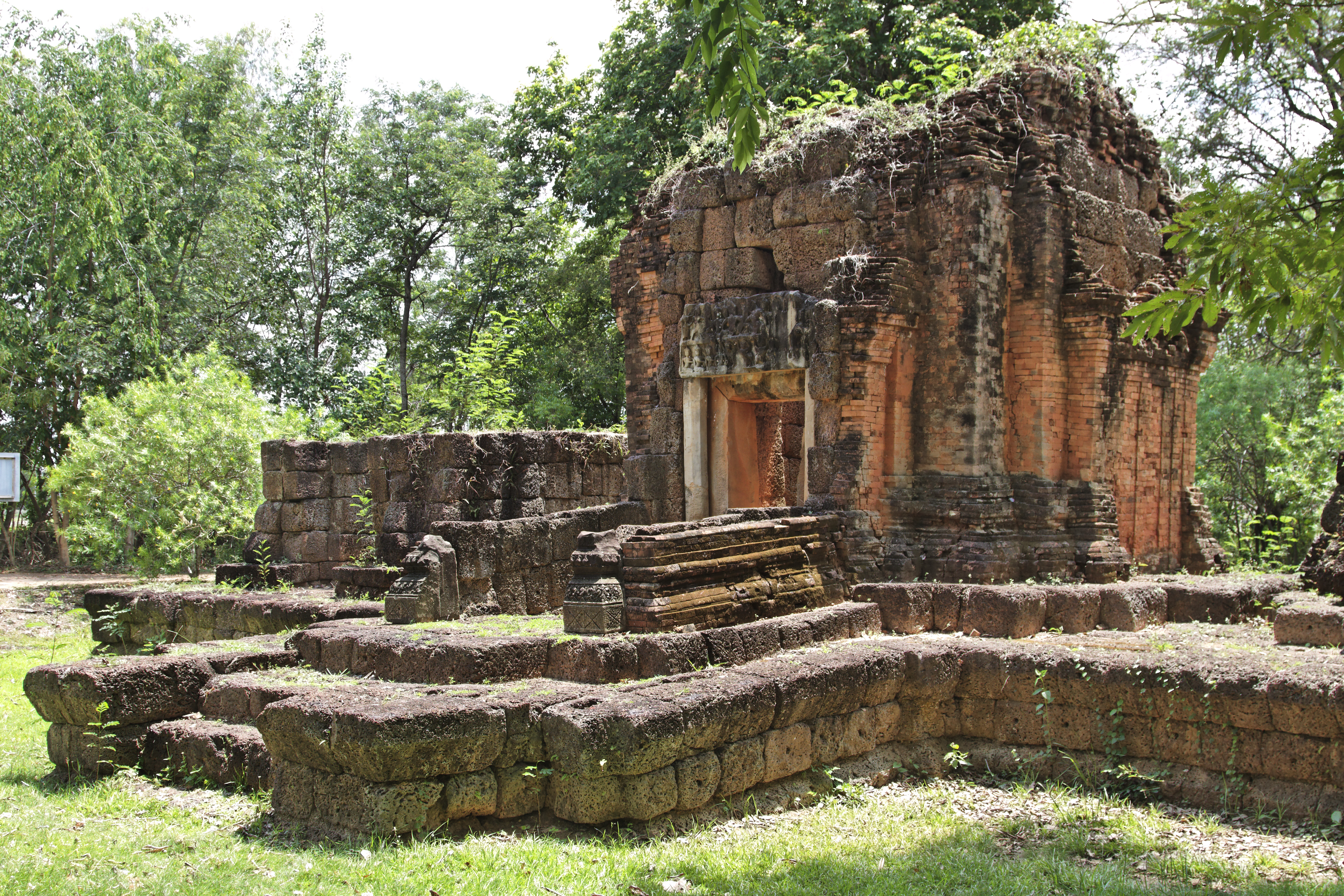
Prasat Prang Ku, Sisaket, Thailand, unknown architect, 12th century

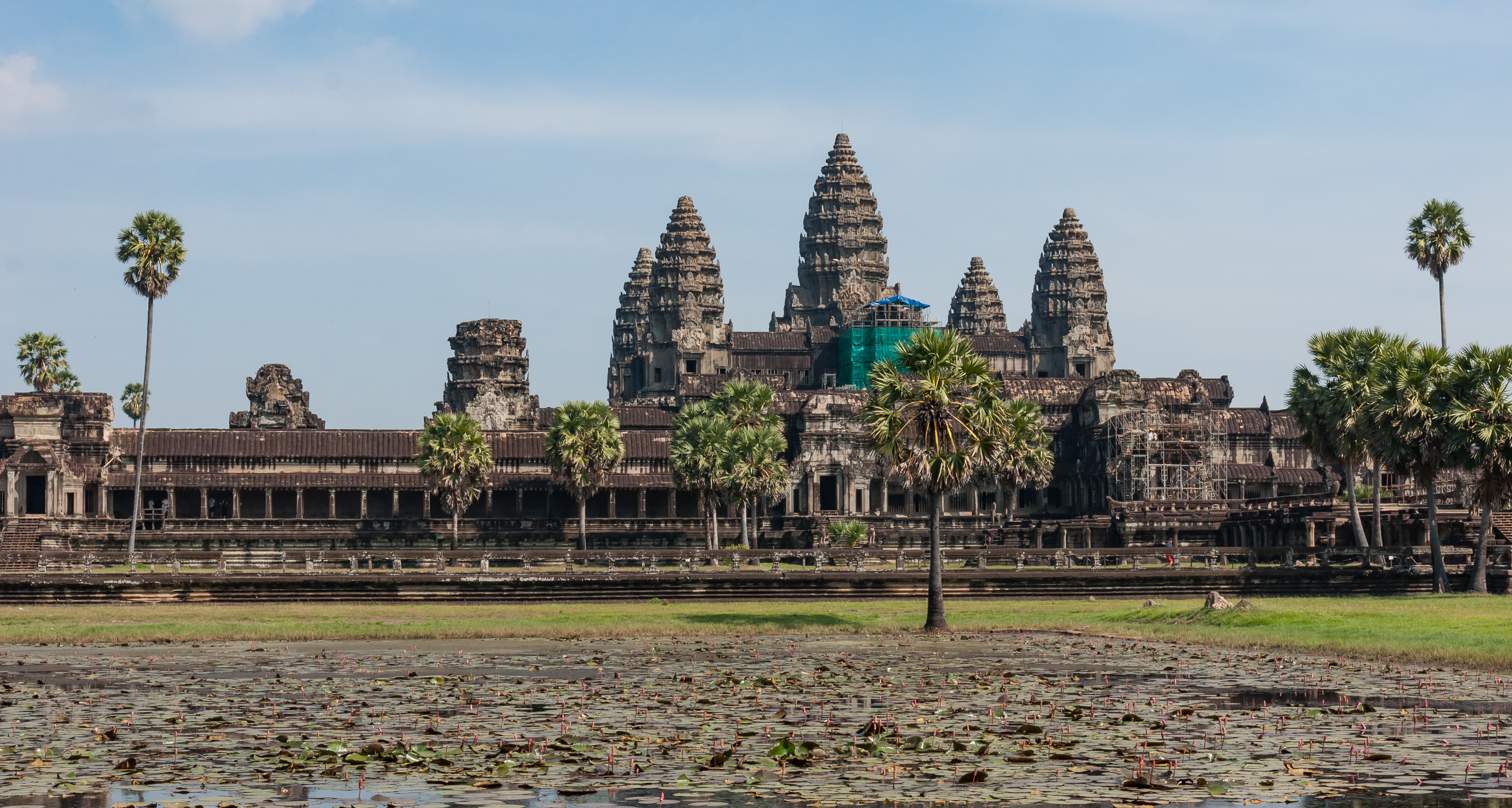
Angkor Wat, Angkor, Cambodia, unknown architect, early 12th century

From the start of the 9th century to the early 15th century, Khmer kings rules over a vad Hindu-Buddhist empire in Southeast Asia. Angkor, in present-day Cambodia, was its capital city, and most of its surviving buildings are east-facing stone temples, many of them constructed in pyramidal, tiered form consisting of five square structures with towers, or prasats, that represent the sacred five-peaked Mount Meru of Hindu, Jain and Buddhist doctrine. As the residences of gods, temples were made of durable materials such as sandstone, brick or laterite, a clay-like substance that dries hard.

Cham architecture in Vietnam also follows a similar style.

== Sub-Saharan Africa ==
Traditional Sub-Saharan African architecture is diverse, varying significantly across regions. Included among traditional house types, are huts, sometimes consisting of one or two rooms, as well as various larger and more complex structures.

=== West African ===
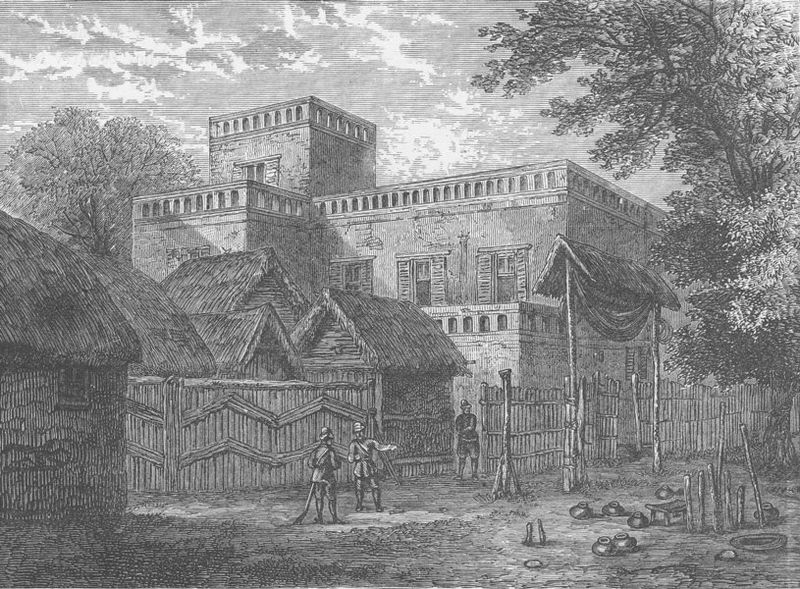
Picture drawn of the main residence of the Asantehene of the Ashanti's, unknown architect, 1800s

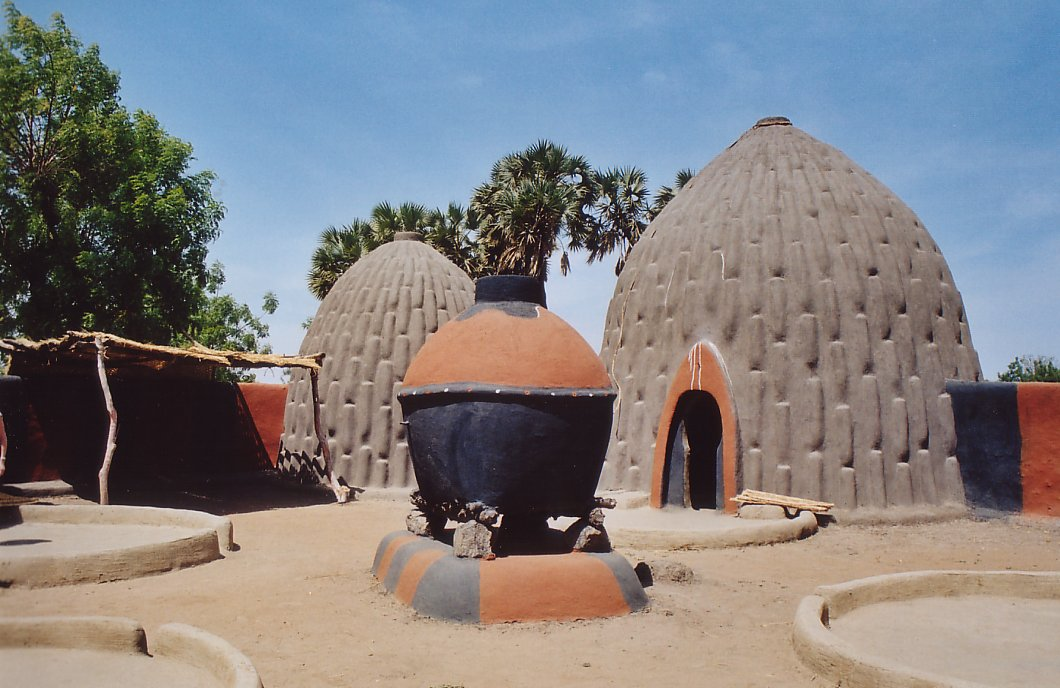
Musgum house in the shape of a shell (artillery) in Cameroon, unknown architect, 1800s

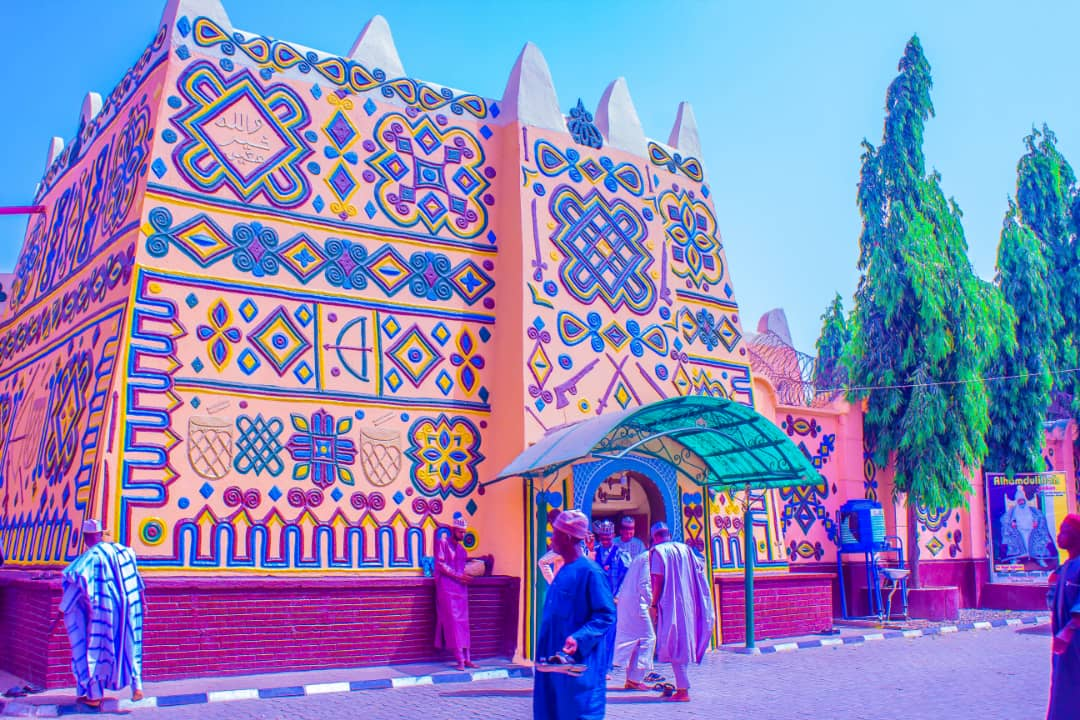
Emir of Bauchi Main Palace in Nigeria, showcasing Hausa architecture, Muhammadu Durugu, 19th century

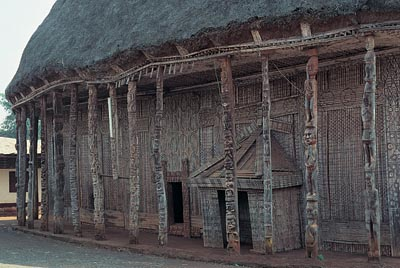
Traditional Bamileke architecture, main hall of the Bandjoun palace in Cameroon, with decoratively carved wooden columns and doorway, unknown architect, unknown date

In much of West Africa, rectangular houses with peaked roofs and courtyards, sometimes consisting of several rooms and courtyards, are also traditionally found (sometimes decorated, with adobe reliefs as among the Ashanti of Ghana, or carved pillars as among the Yoruba people of Nigeria, especially in palaces and the dwellings of the wealthy) Besides the regular rectangular type of dwelling with a sharp roof, widespread in West Africa and Madagascar, there also other types of houses: beehive houses made from a circle of stones topped with a domed roof, and the round one, with a cone-shaped roof. The first type, which also existed in America, is characteristic especially for Southern Africa. These were used by Bantu-speaking groups in southern and parts of east Africa, which was made with mud, poles, thatch, and cow dung (rectangular houses were more common among the Bantu-speaking peoples of the greater Congo region and central Africa). The round hut with a cone-shaped roof is widespread especially in Sudan and Eastern Africa, but is also present in Colombia and New Caledonia, as well as in the Western Sudan and Sahel regions of west Africa, where they are sometimes arranged into compounds. A distinct style of traditional wooden architecture exists among the Grassland peoples of Cameroon, such as the Bamileke.

In several West African societies, including the kingdom of Benin (and of other Edo peoples), and the kingdoms of the Yoruba, Hausa, at sites like Jenne-Jeno (a pre-Islamic city in Mali), and elsewhere, towns and cities were surrounded by large walls of mud brick or adobe, and sometimes by monumental moats and earthworks, such as Sungbo's Eredo (in the Nigerian Yoruba kingdom of Ijebu) and the Walls of Benin (of the Nigerian Kingdom of Benin). In medieval southern Africa, a tradition existed of fortified stone settlements such as Great Zimbabwe and Khami.

The famed Benin City of southwest Nigeria (capital of the Kingdom of Benin) destroyed by the Punitive Expedition, was a large complex of homes in coursed clay, with hipped roofs of shingles or palm leaves. The Palace had a sequence of ceremonial rooms, and was decorated with brass plaques. It was surrounded by a monumental complex of earthworks and walls whose construction is thought to have begun by the early Middle Ages.

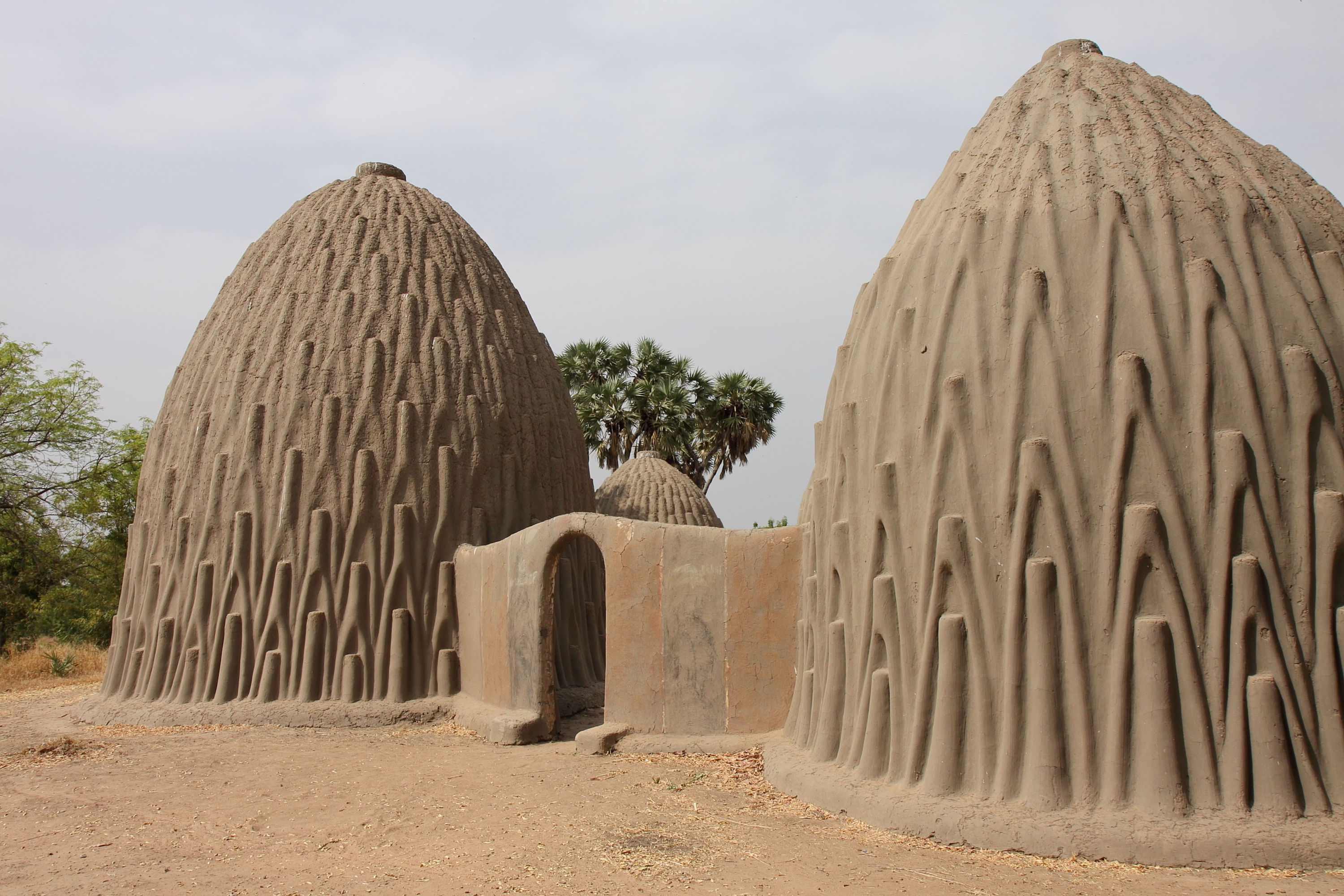
Beehive-shaped houses of the Musgum ethnic group in Pouss, Cameroon, unknown architect, unknown date

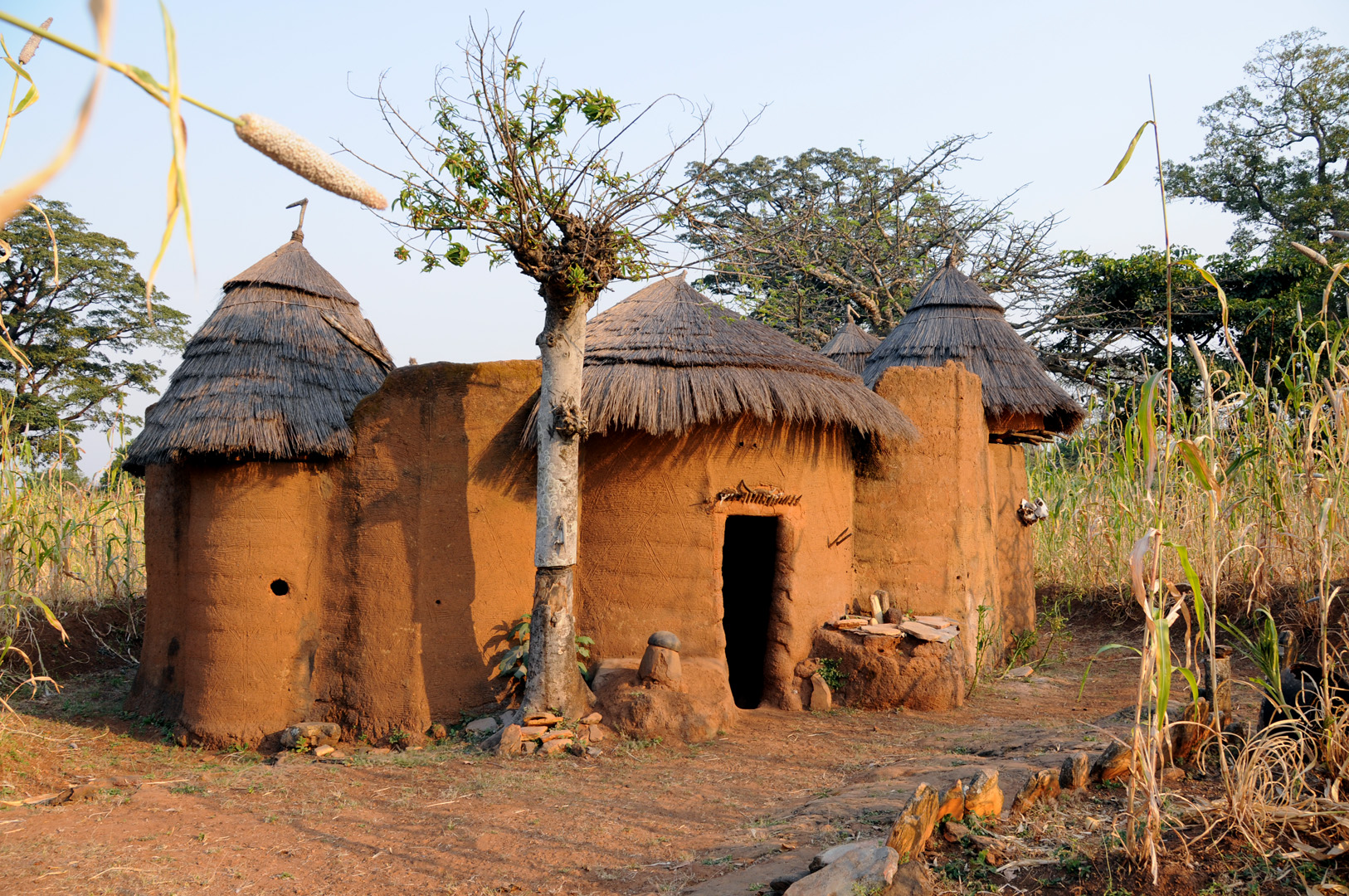
A traditional house of the Tammari people in the Atakora Department of the northern Republic of Benin (not to be confused with the Nigerian Kingdom of Benin), unknown architect, unknown date

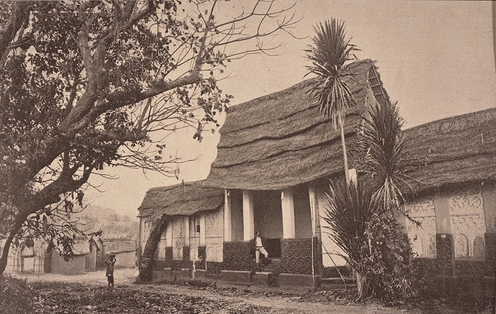
Palace of Ashanti Kwaku Dua of Kumasi, Ghana, unknown architect, 1896

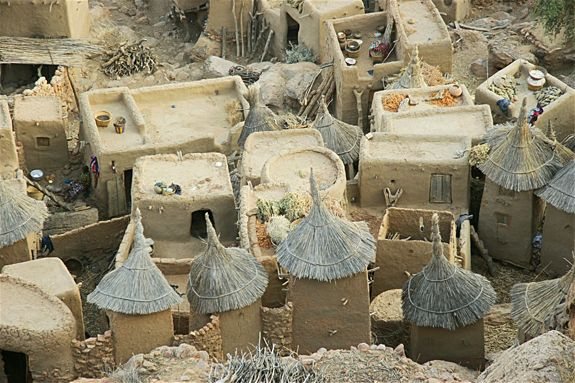
A Dogon village in Mali, with walls made in the wattle and daub method, unknown architect, unknown date

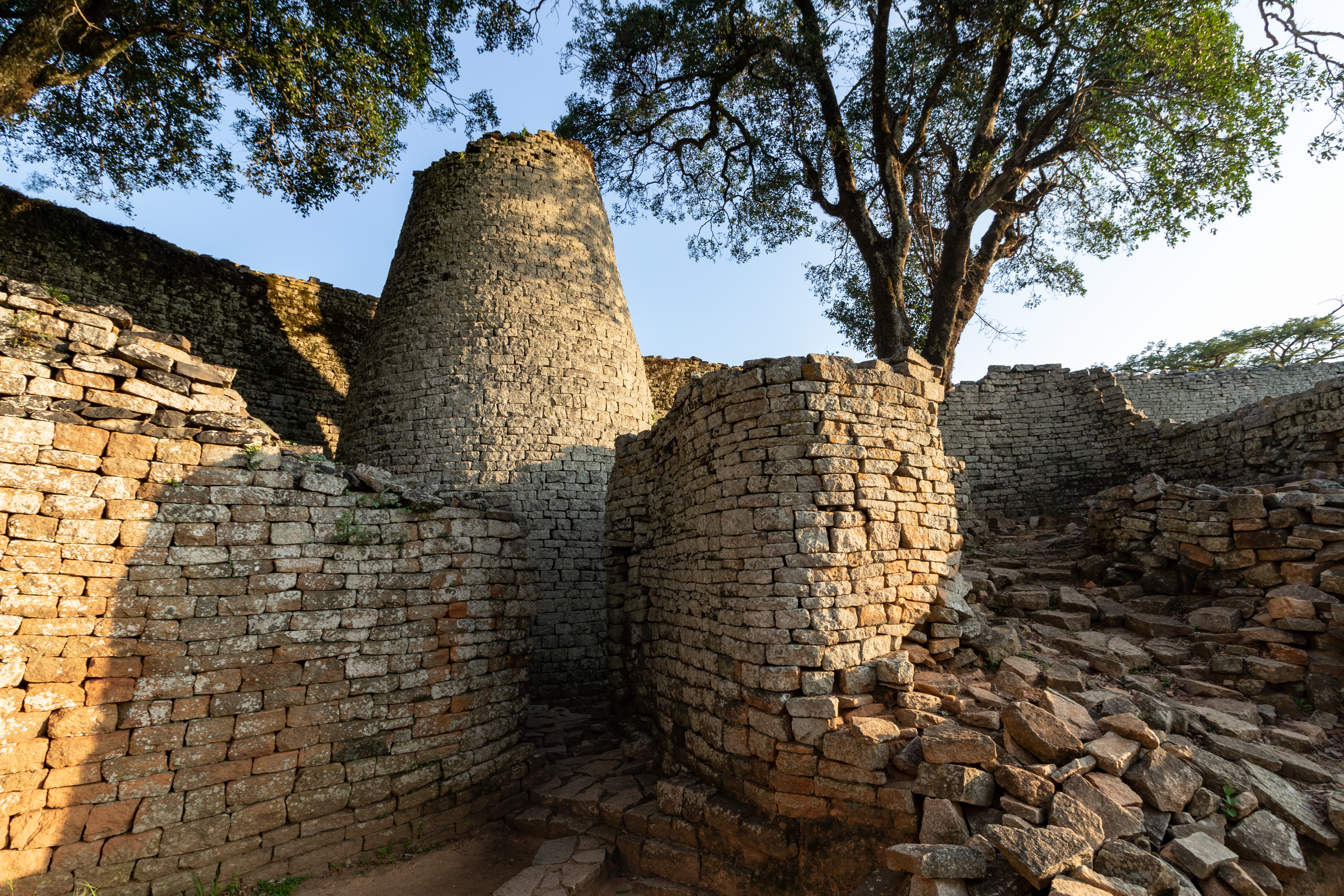
The conical tower inside the Great Enclosure in Great Zimbabwe, a medieval city built by a prosperous culture, unknown architect, c.11th–14th century

=== Sahelian ===
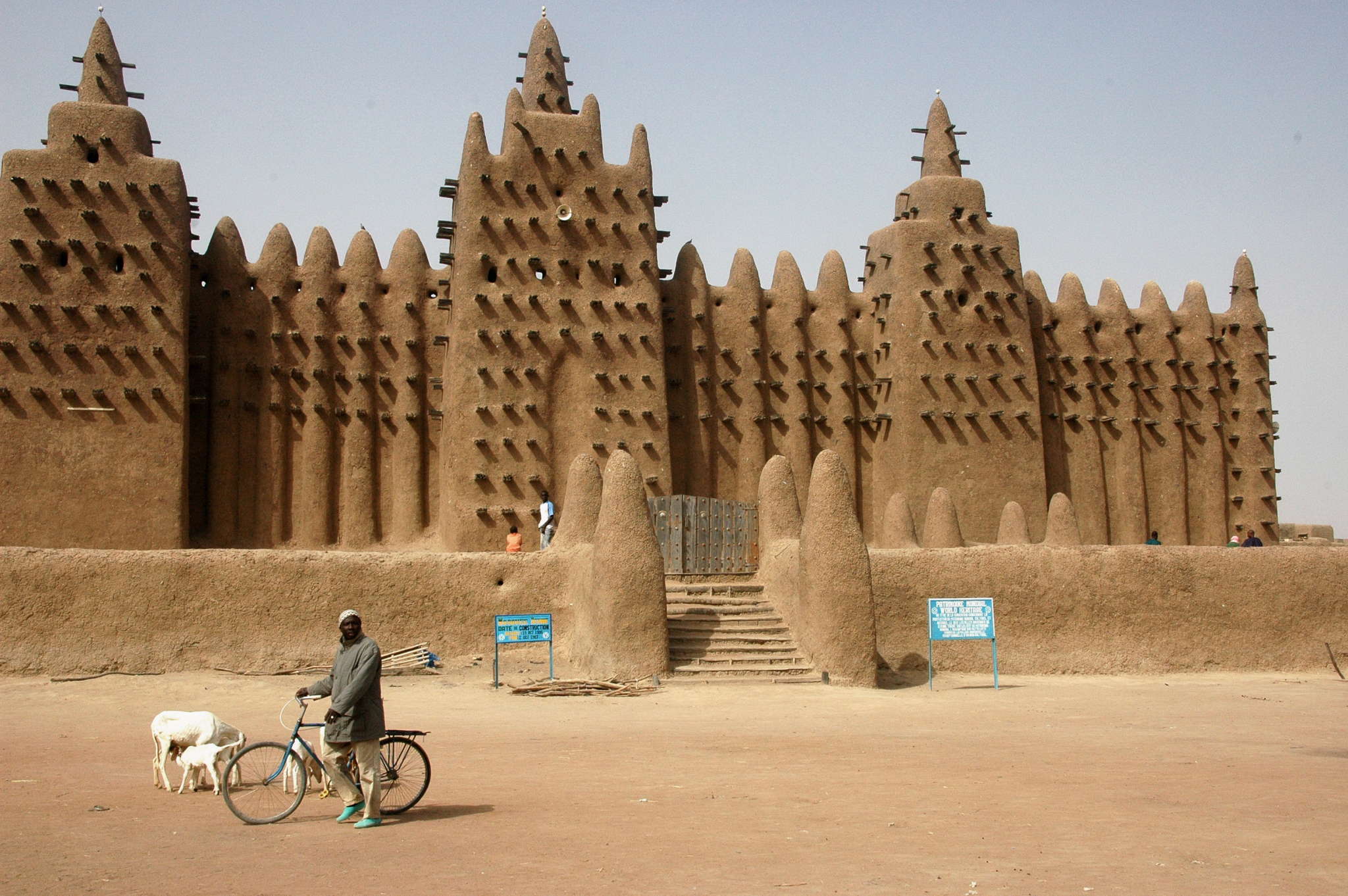
The Great Mosque of Djenné, Djenné, Mali, an icon for the Sudano-Sahelian architecture, unknown architect, originally built in the 13th-14th centuries, rebuilt in 1907, adobe

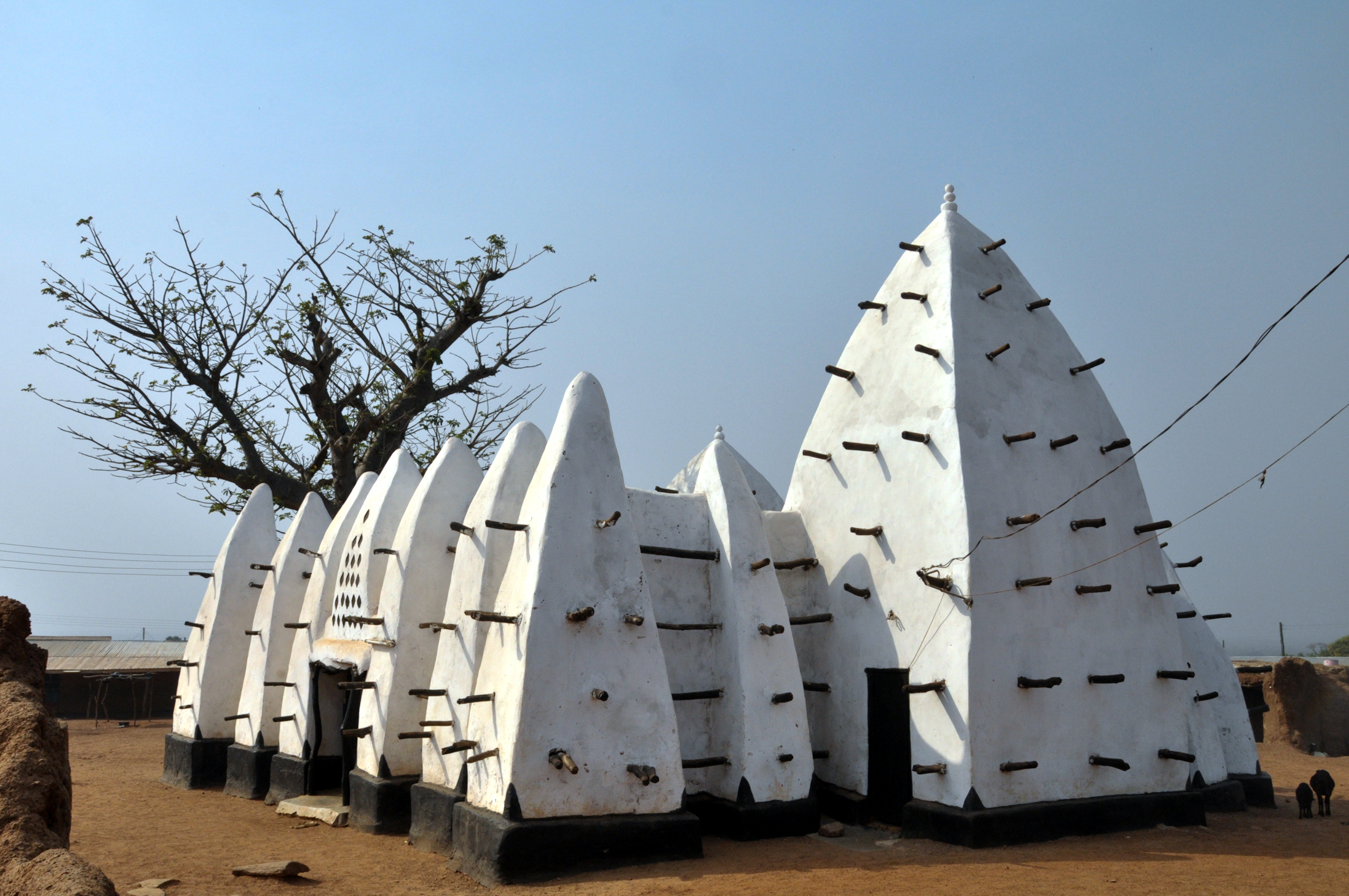
The Larabanga Mosque, Larabanga, northern Ghana, unknown architect, possibly built in the 15th century

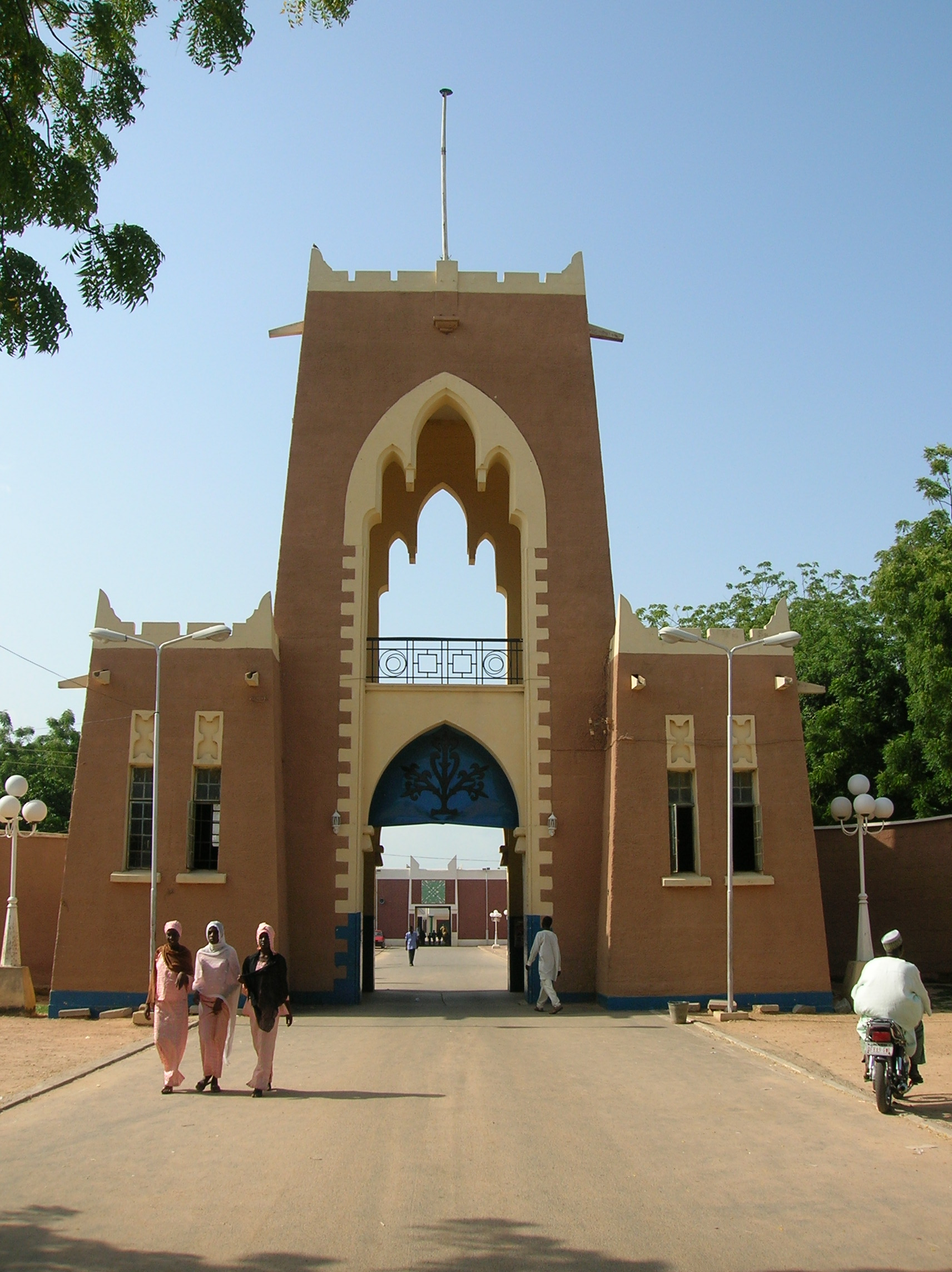
Hausa gate, the Gidan Rumfa in Kano, northern Nigeria, unknown architect, 15th century

In the Western Sahel region, Islamic influence was a major contributing factor to architectural development from the later ages of the Kingdom of Ghana. At Kumbi Saleh, locals lived in domed-shaped dwellings in the king's section of the city, surrounded by a great enclosure. Traders lived in stone houses in a section which possessed 12 beautiful mosques, as described by al-bakri, with one centered on Friday prayer. The king is said to have owned several mansions, one of which was sixty-six feet long, forty-two feet wide, contained seven rooms, was two stories high, and had a staircase; with the walls and chambers filled with sculpture and painting.

Sahelian architecture initially grew from the two cities of Djenné and Timbuktu. The Sankore Mosque in Timbuktu, constructed from mud on timber, was similar in style to the Great Mosque of Djenné. The rise of kingdoms in the West African coastal region produced architecture which drew on indigenous traditions, utilizing wood, mud-brick and adobe. Though later acquiring Islamic influences, the style also had roots in local pre-Islamic building styles, such as those found in ancient settlements like Jenne-Jeno, Dia, Mali, and Dhar Tichitt, some of which employed a traditional sahelian style of cylindrical mud brick.

=== Ethiopian ===
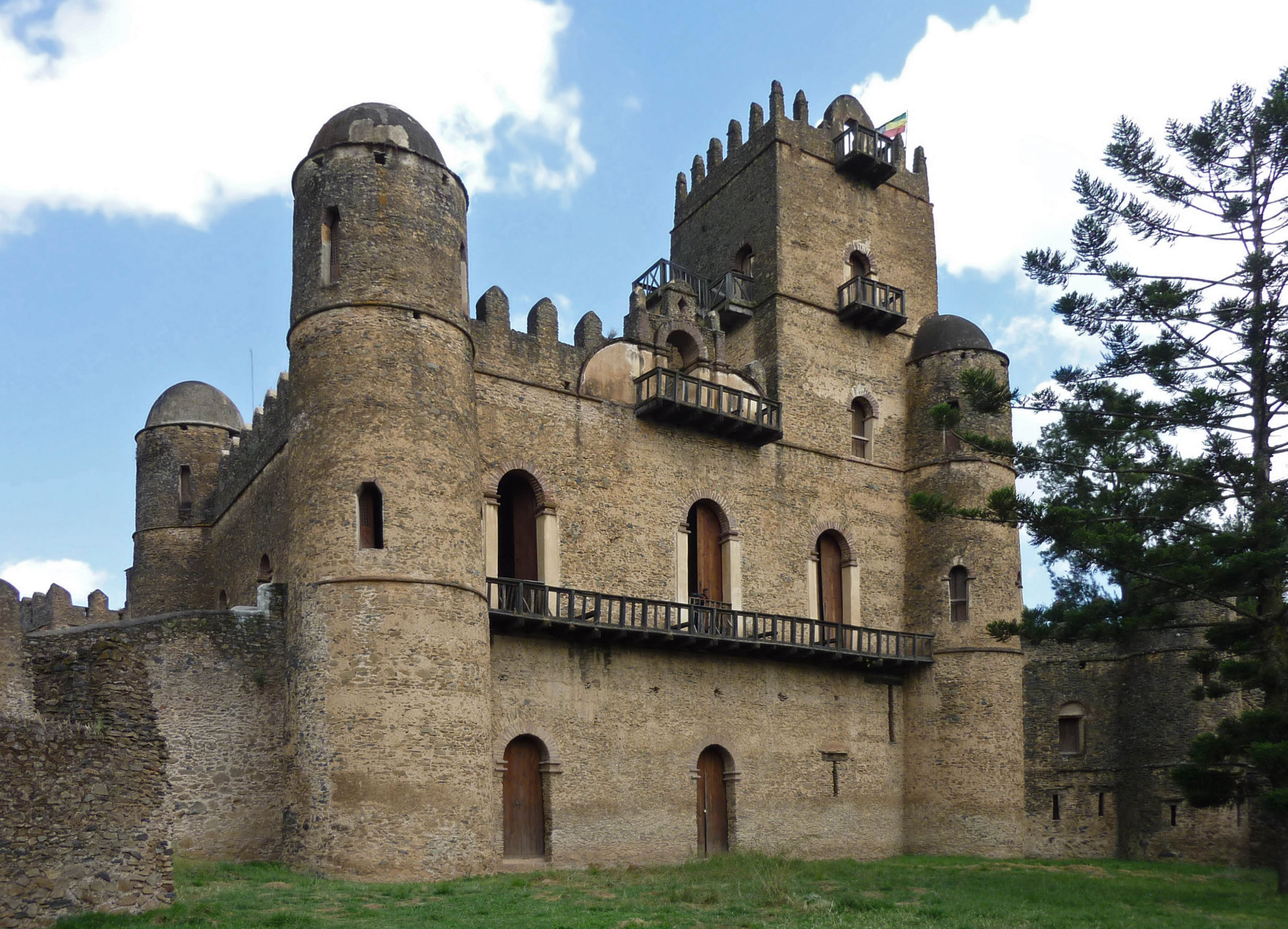
Emperor Fasilides' castle, founded by him in the 17th century

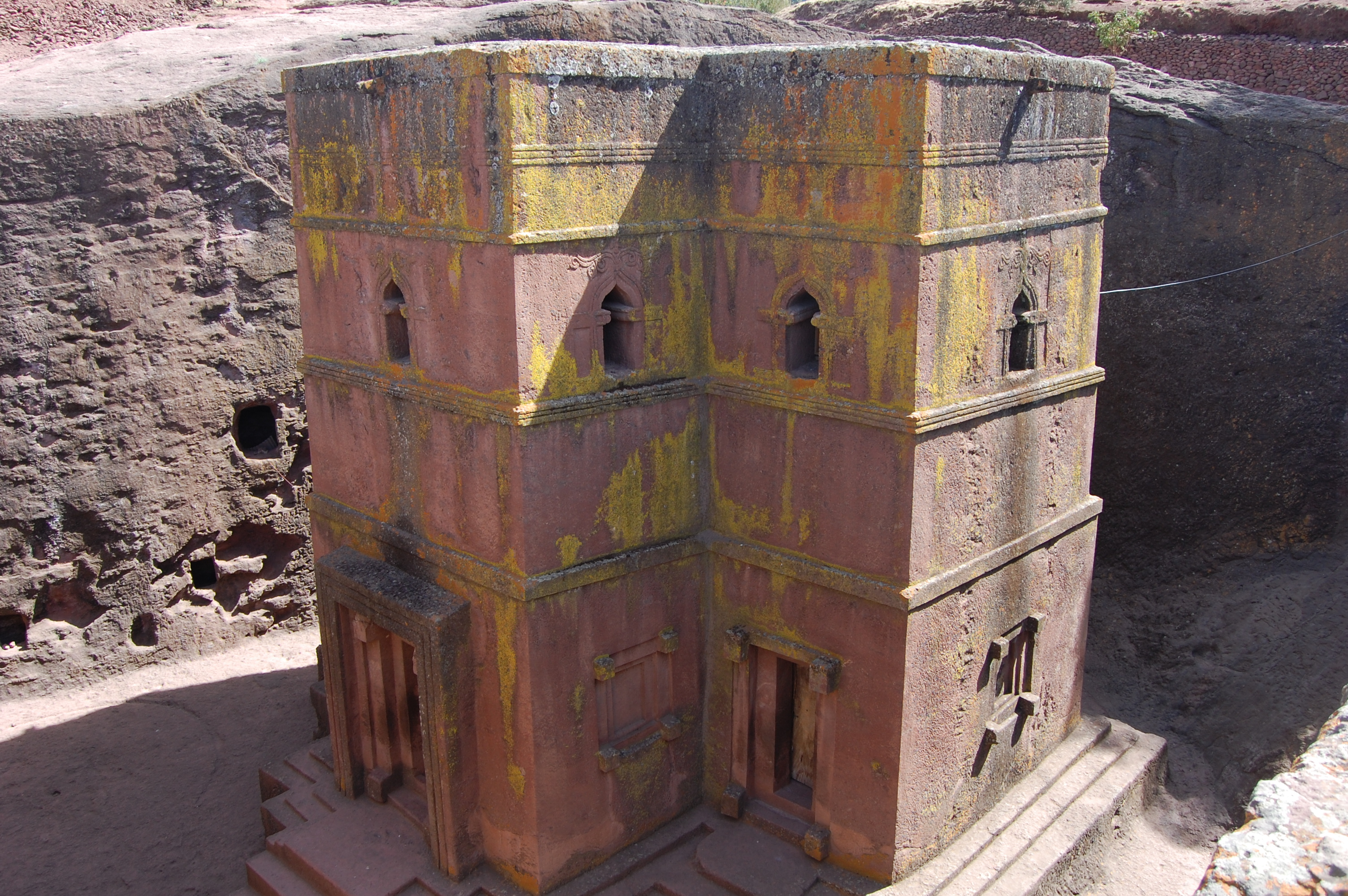
Large, monolithic churches such as the Church of Saint George (Lalibela), were hewn out of the ground in Ethiopia, unknown architect, late 12th or early 13th century

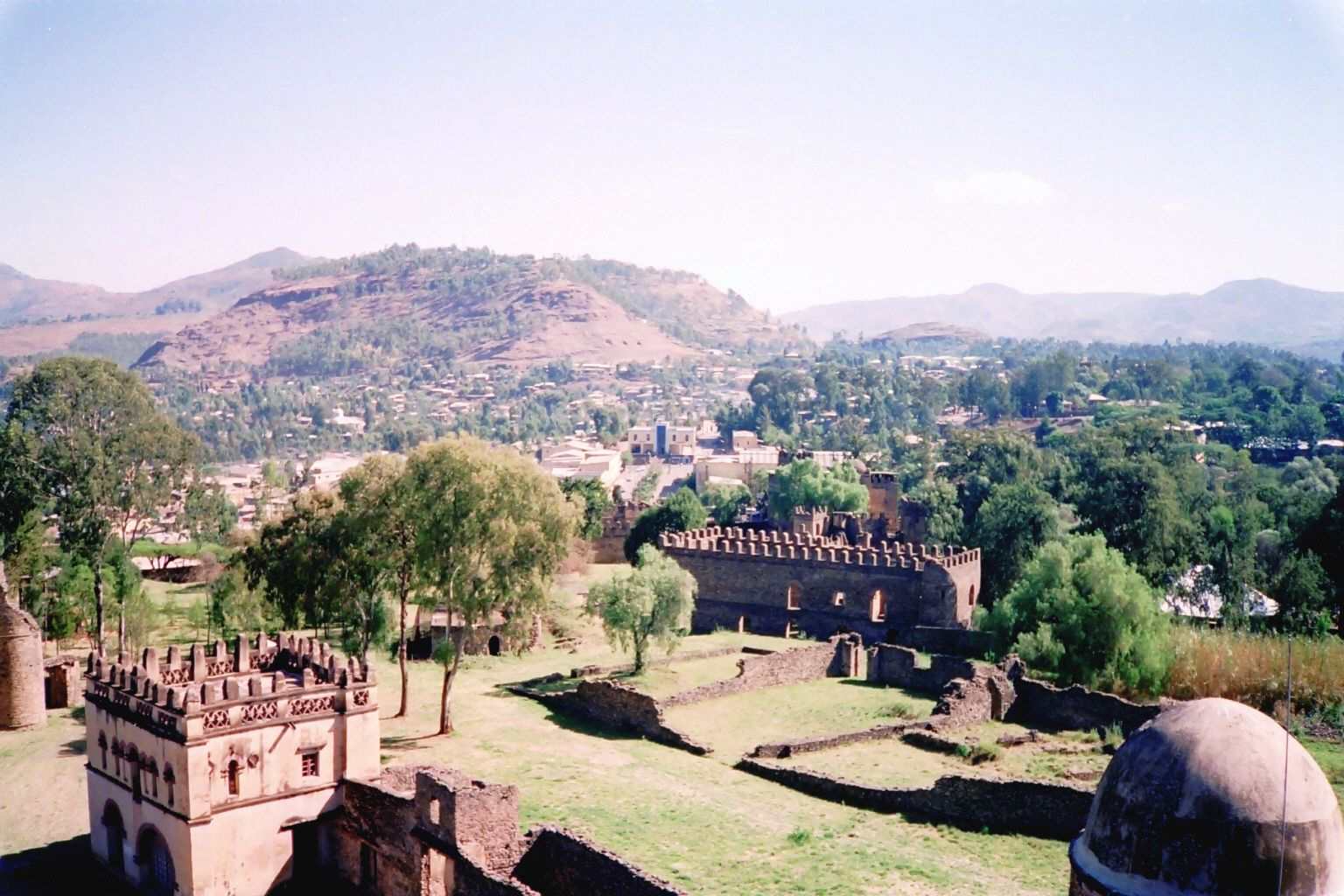
A picture of the medieval Gondar city in Ethiopia

Ethiopian architecture (including modern-day Eritrea) expanded from the Aksumite style and incorporated new traditions with the expansion of the Ethiopian state. Styles incorporated more wood and rounder structures in domestic architecture in the center of the country and the south, and these stylistic influences were manifested in the construction of churches and monasteries. Throughout the medieval period, Aksumite architecture and influences and its monolithic tradition persisted, with its influence strongest in the early medieval (Late Aksumite) and Zagwe periods (when the rock-cut monolithic churches of Lalibela were carved). Throughout the medieval period, and especially from the 10th to 12th centuries, churches were hewn out of rock throughout Ethiopia, especially during the northernmost region of Tigray, which was the heart of the Aksumite Empire. The most famous example of Ethiopian rock-hewn architecture are the eleven monolithic churches of Lalibela, carved out of the red volcanic tuff found around the town. During the early modern period in Ethiopia, the absorption of new diverse influences such as Baroque, Arab, Turkish and Gujarati style began with the arrival of Portuguese Jesuit missionaries in the 16th and 17th centuries.

=== Somali ===
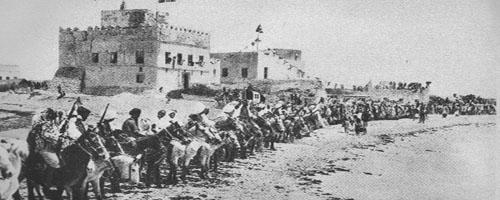
Hobyo Sultanate Cavalry Standing Before A Somali Fort

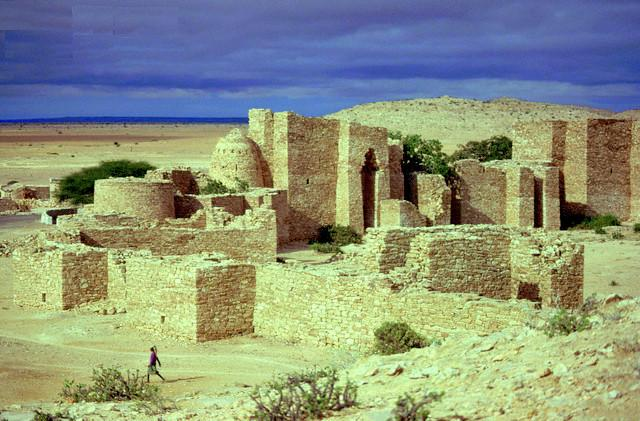
Ruins of Taleh Dhulbahante garesa of Garad Diiriye Guure, Taleh, SSC-Khatumo state, Somalia

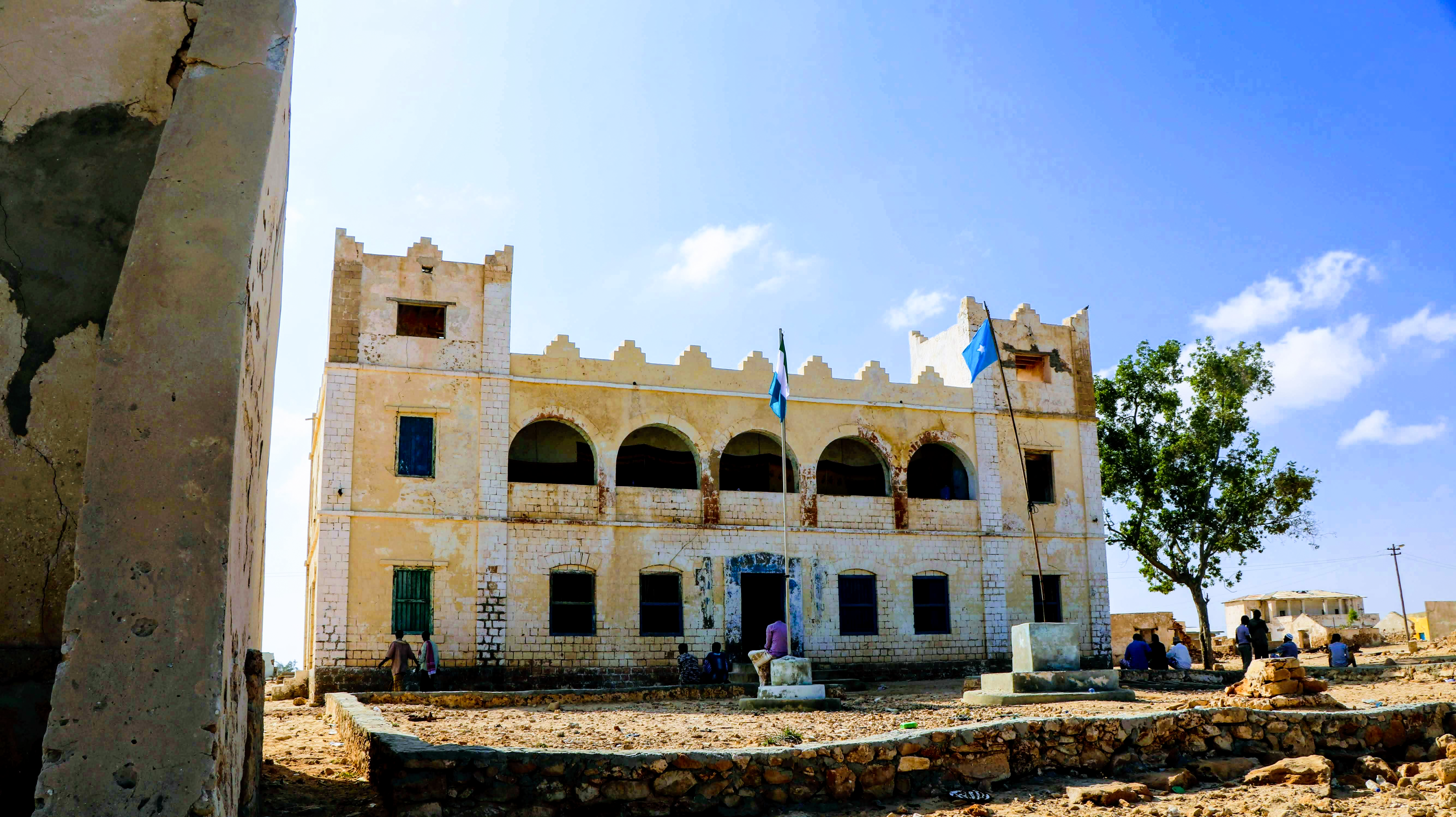
Ruins of an old building in Gondershe, a historic coastal town in Somalia

Traditional Somali architecture dates at least to two thousand years ago, from its medieval sultanates and city states. The architecture usually includes the engineering stone cities, castles, citadels, fortresses, mosques, temples, aqueducts, lighthouses, towers and tombs. The arrival of Islam to Somalia brought Islamic architectural influences from the Arabian Peninsula and Persia, which stimulated a shift from drystone and other materials to coral stone, sundried bricks and limestone.

The lucrative commercial networks of successive medieval Somali kingdoms and city-states such as the Adal Sultanate, Sultanate of Mogadishu, Ajuran Sultanate, and the Sultanate of the Geledi saw the establishment of several dozen stone cities in the interior of Somalia as well as the coastal regions. Ibn Battuta visiting Mogadishu in the early 14th century called it a town endless in size and Vasco Da Gama who passed by Mogadishu in the 15th century noted that it was a large city with houses of four or five storeys high and big palaces in its centre.

== Oceania ==
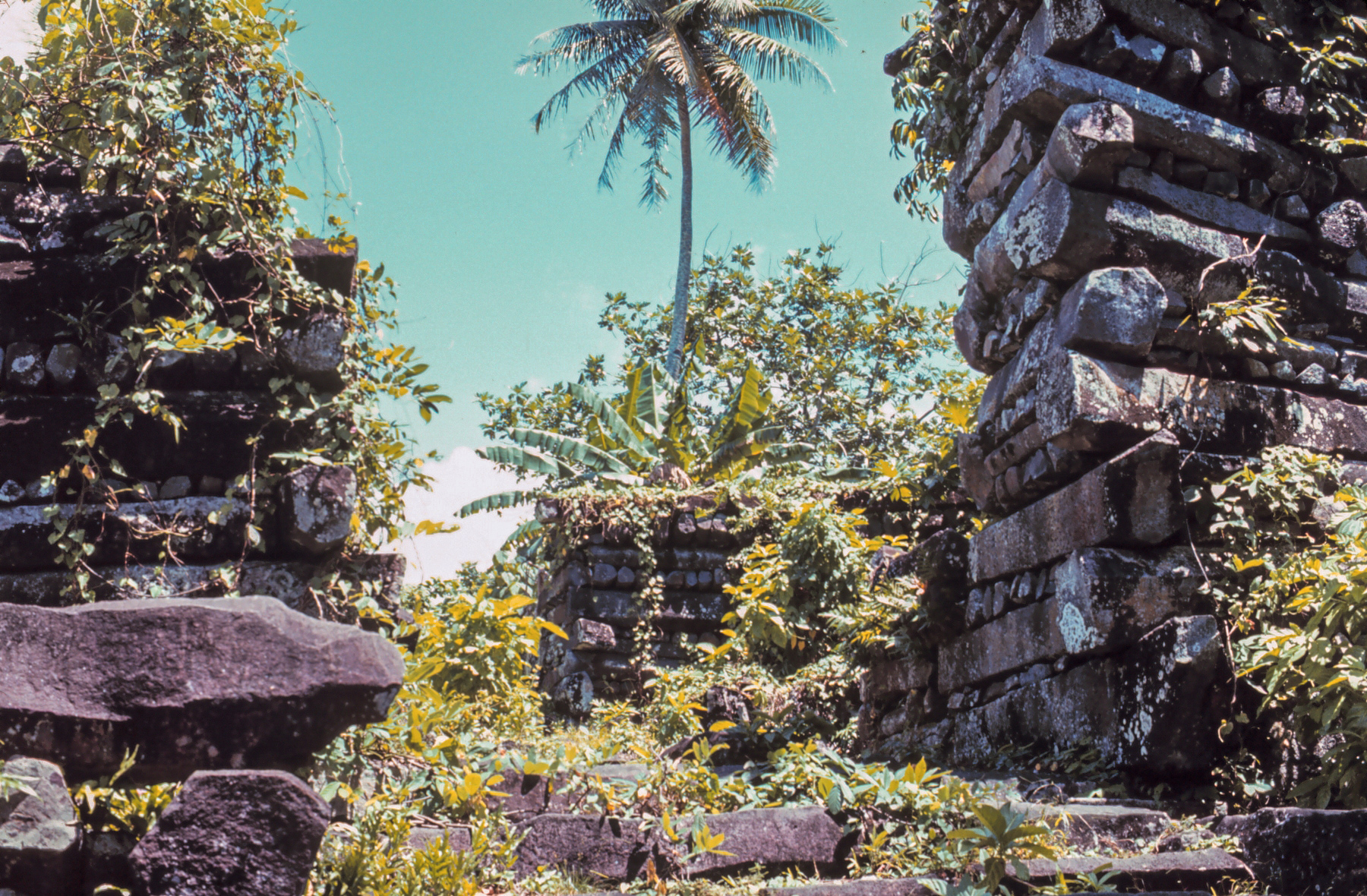
Ruins of Nan Madol, Pohnpei island, Federated States of Micronesia, unknown architect, c.8th-13th centuries

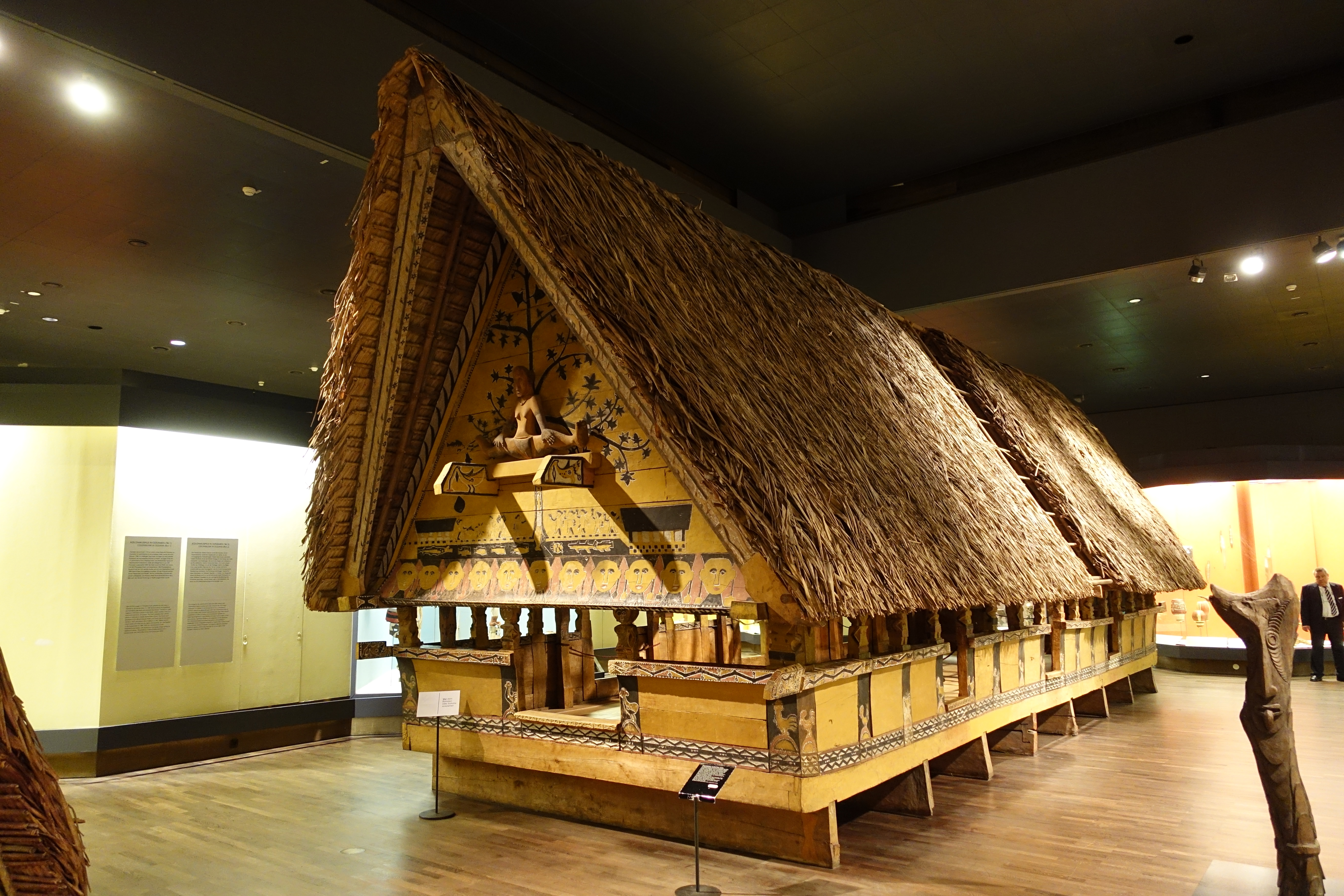
Men's club house, from Palau, now in Ethnological Museum of Berlin, unknown architect, 1907

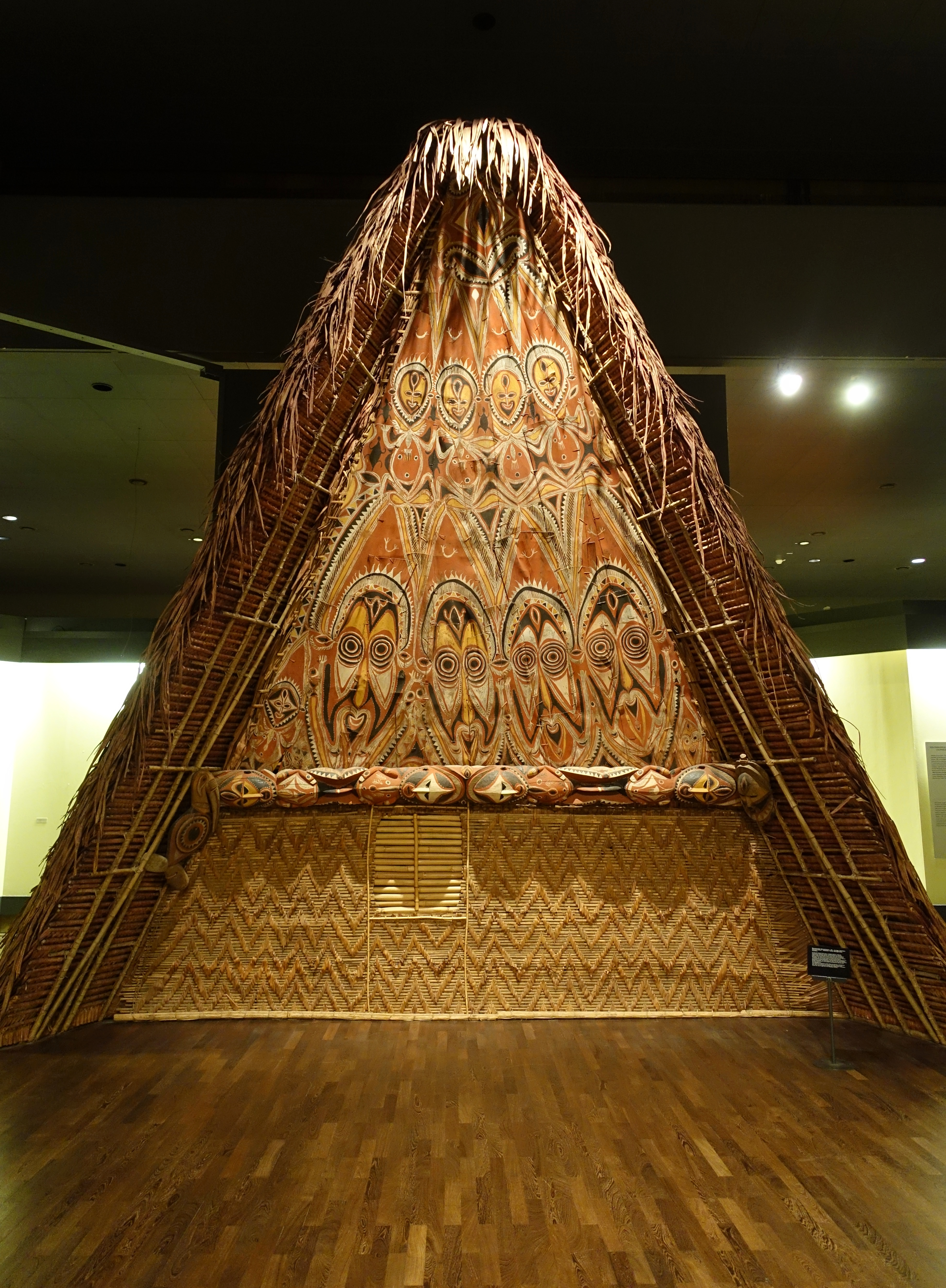
Detail of a ceremonial supply house, from Papua New Guinea, now in Ethnological Museum of Berlin

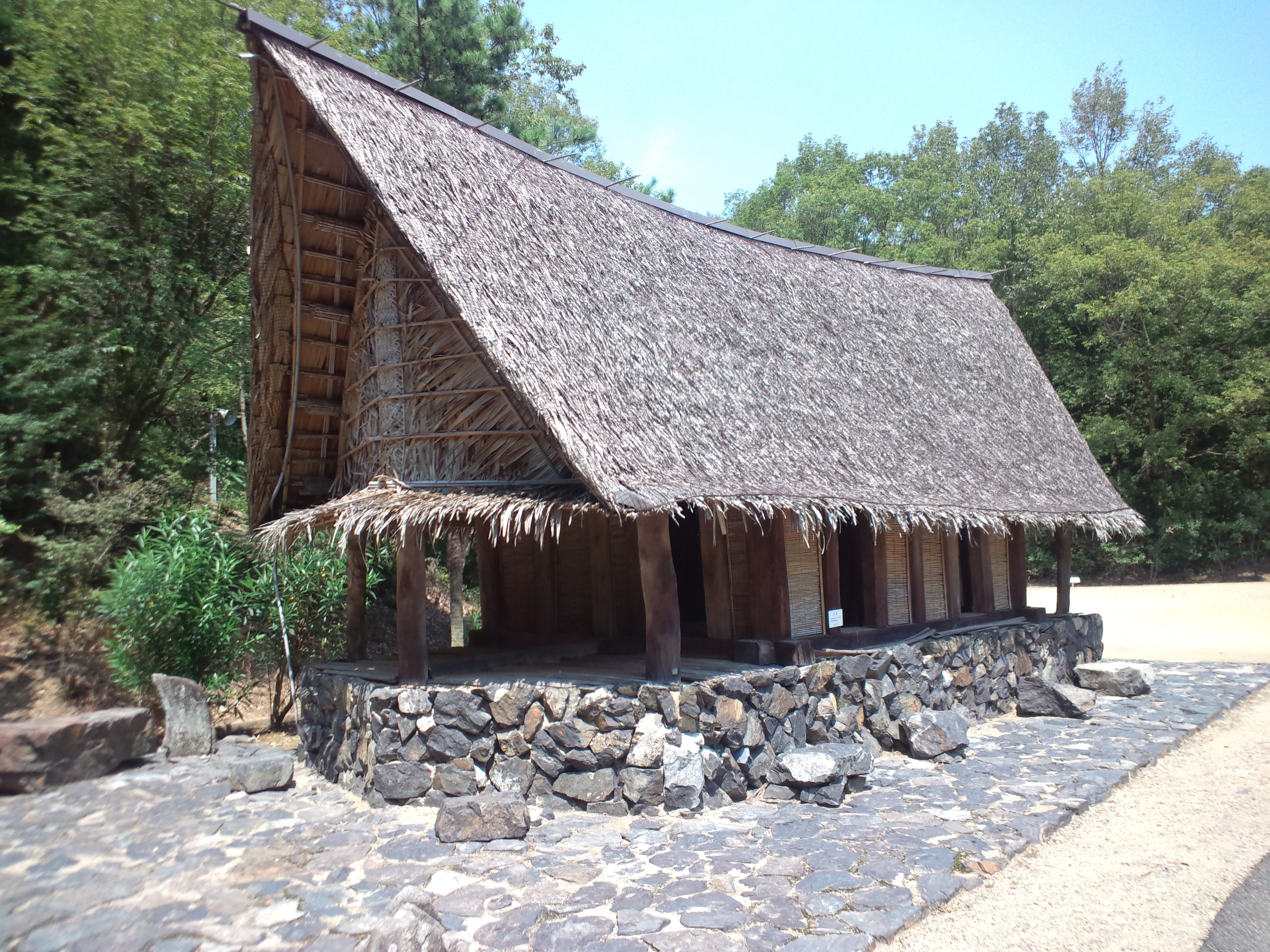
Traditional house in Micronesia, unknown architect, unknown date

Most Oceanic buildings consist of huts, made of wood and other vegetal materials. Art and architecture have often been closely connected—for example, storehouses and meetinghouses are often decorated with elaborate carvings—and so they are presented together in this discussion. The architecture of the Pacific Islands was varied and sometimes large in scale. Buildings reflected the structure and preoccupations of the societies that constructed them, with considerable symbolic detail. Technically, most buildings in Oceania were no more than simple assemblages of poles held together with cane lashings; only in the Caroline Islands were complex methods of joining and pegging known.

An important Oceanic archaeological site is Nan Madol from the Federated States of Micronesia. Nan Madol was the ceremonial and political seat of the Saudeleur Dynasty, which united Pohnpei's estimated 25,000 people until about 1628. Set apart between the main island of Pohnpei and Temwen Island, it was a scene of human activity as early as the first or second century AD. By the 8th or 9th century, islet construction had started, with construction of the distinctive megalithic architecture beginning 1180–1200 AD.

== Islamic ==
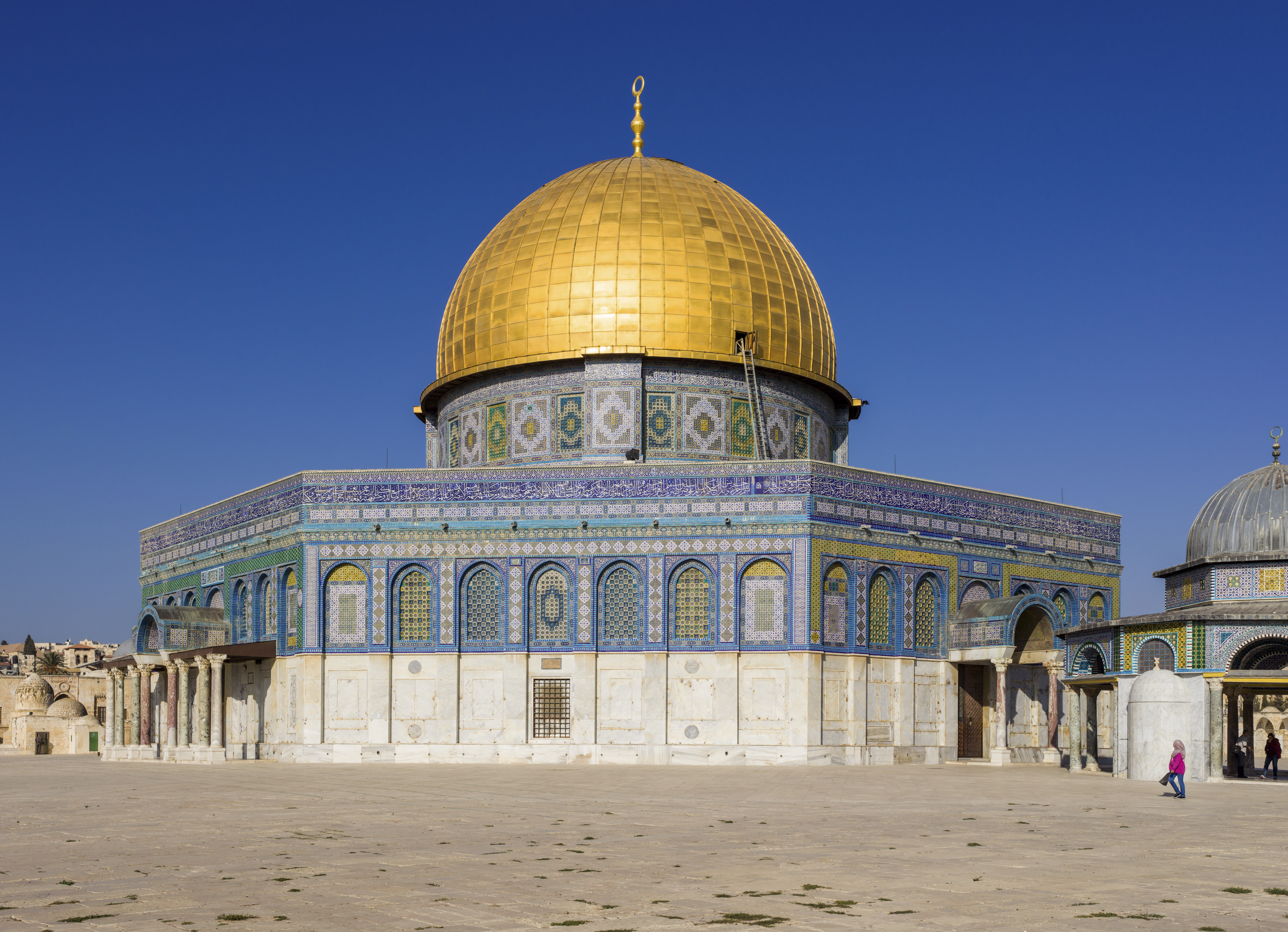
Dome of the Rock, Jerusalem, by Raja ibn Haywa al-Kindi and Yazid ibn Sallam, 691

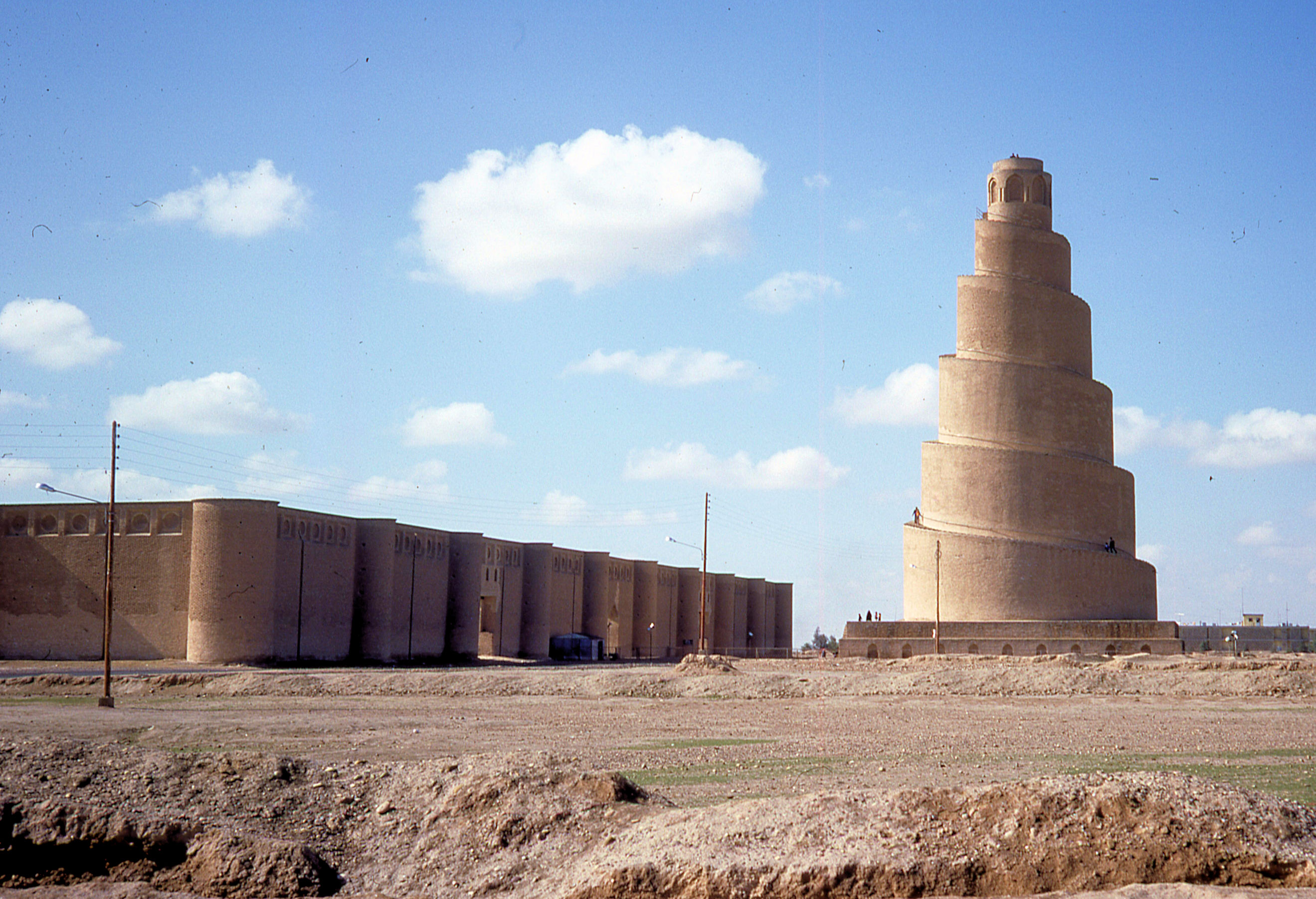
Great Mosque of Samarra, Samarra, Iraq, unknown architect, c.851

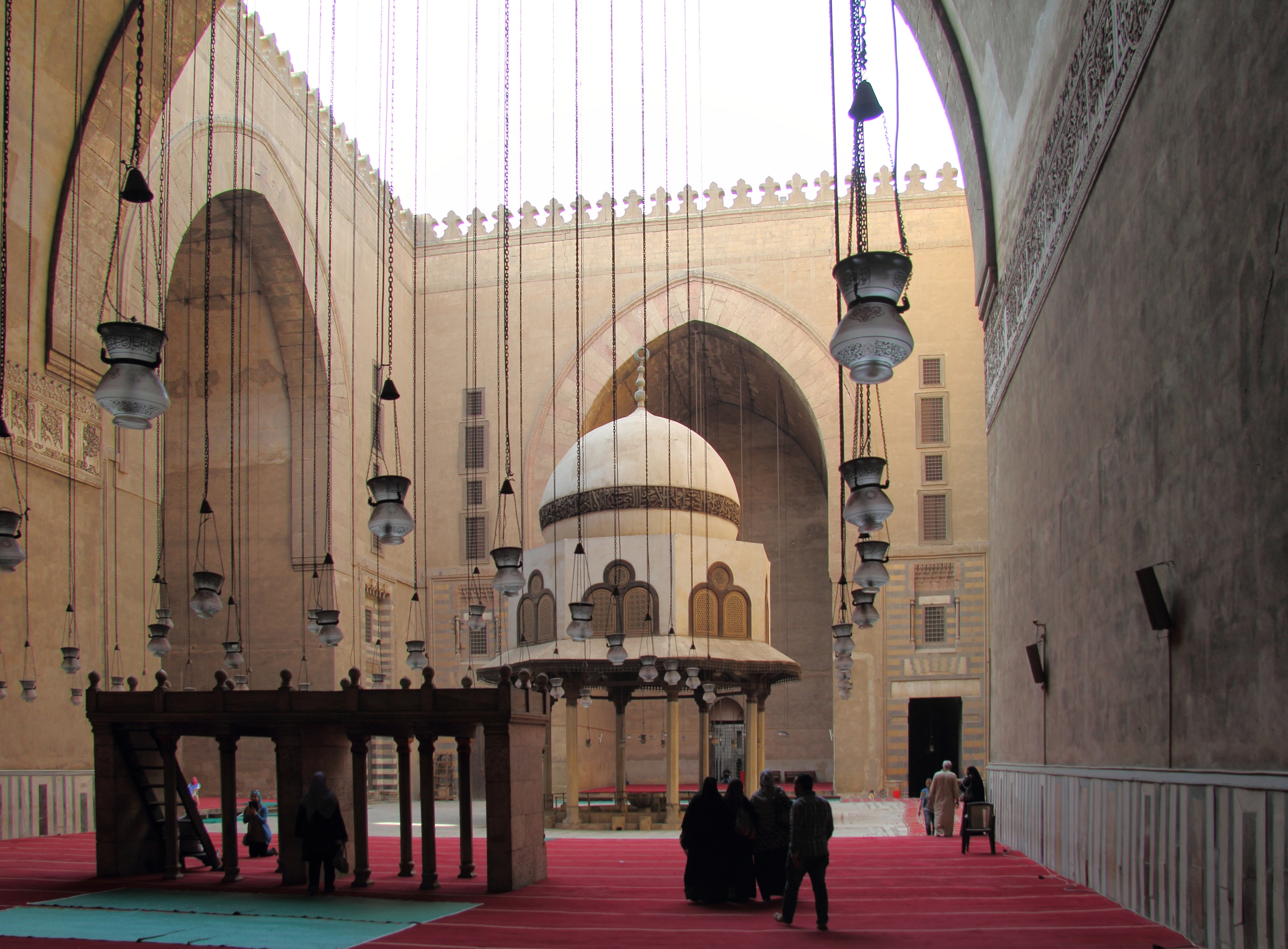
Mosque-Madrasa of Sultan Hasan, Cairo, Egypt, unknown architect, 1356-1363

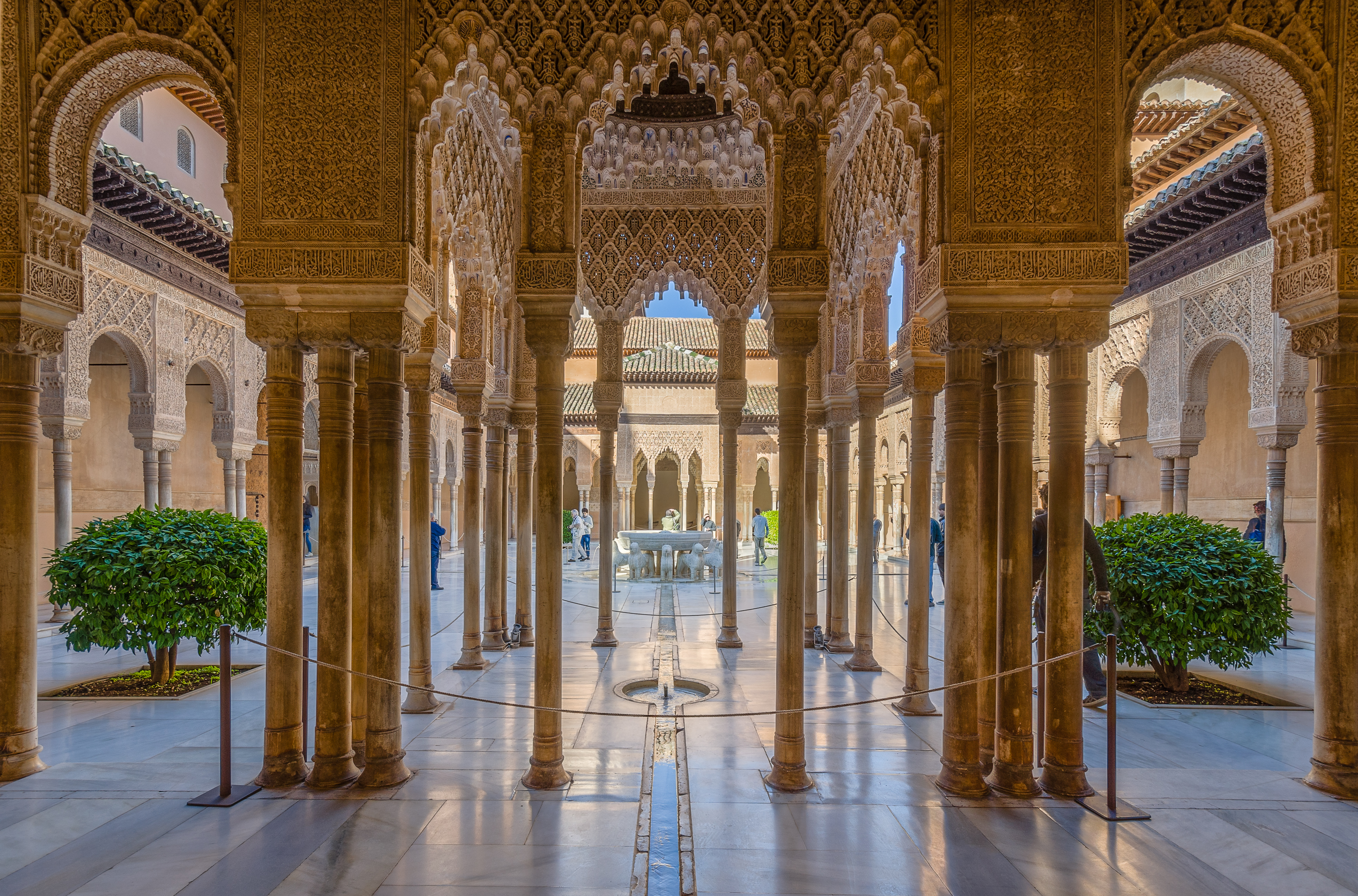
Court of the Lions, Alhambra, Granada, Spain, unknown architect, 1362-1391

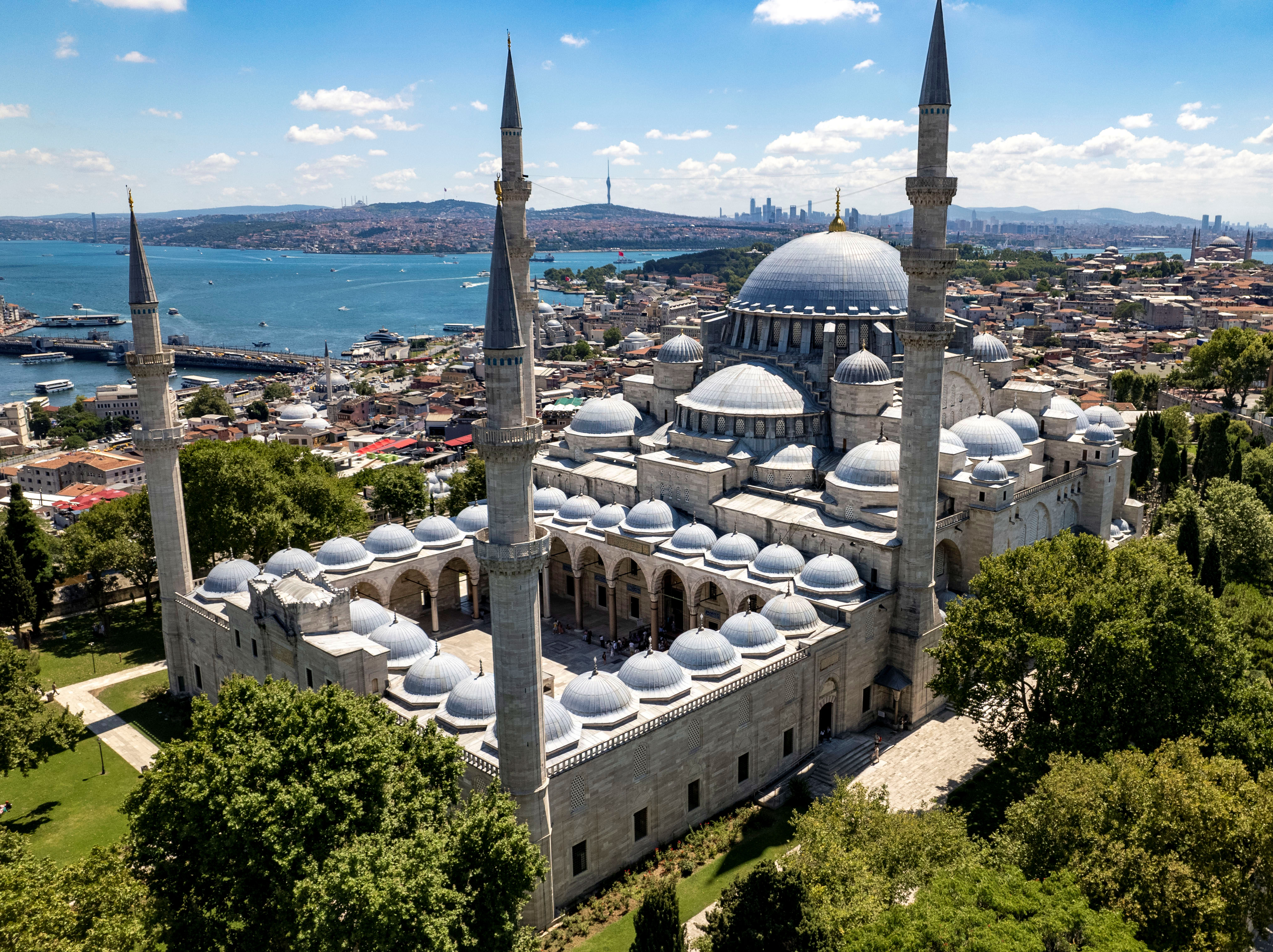
Süleymaniye Mosque, Istanbul, Turkey, by Mimar Sinan, 1550-1557

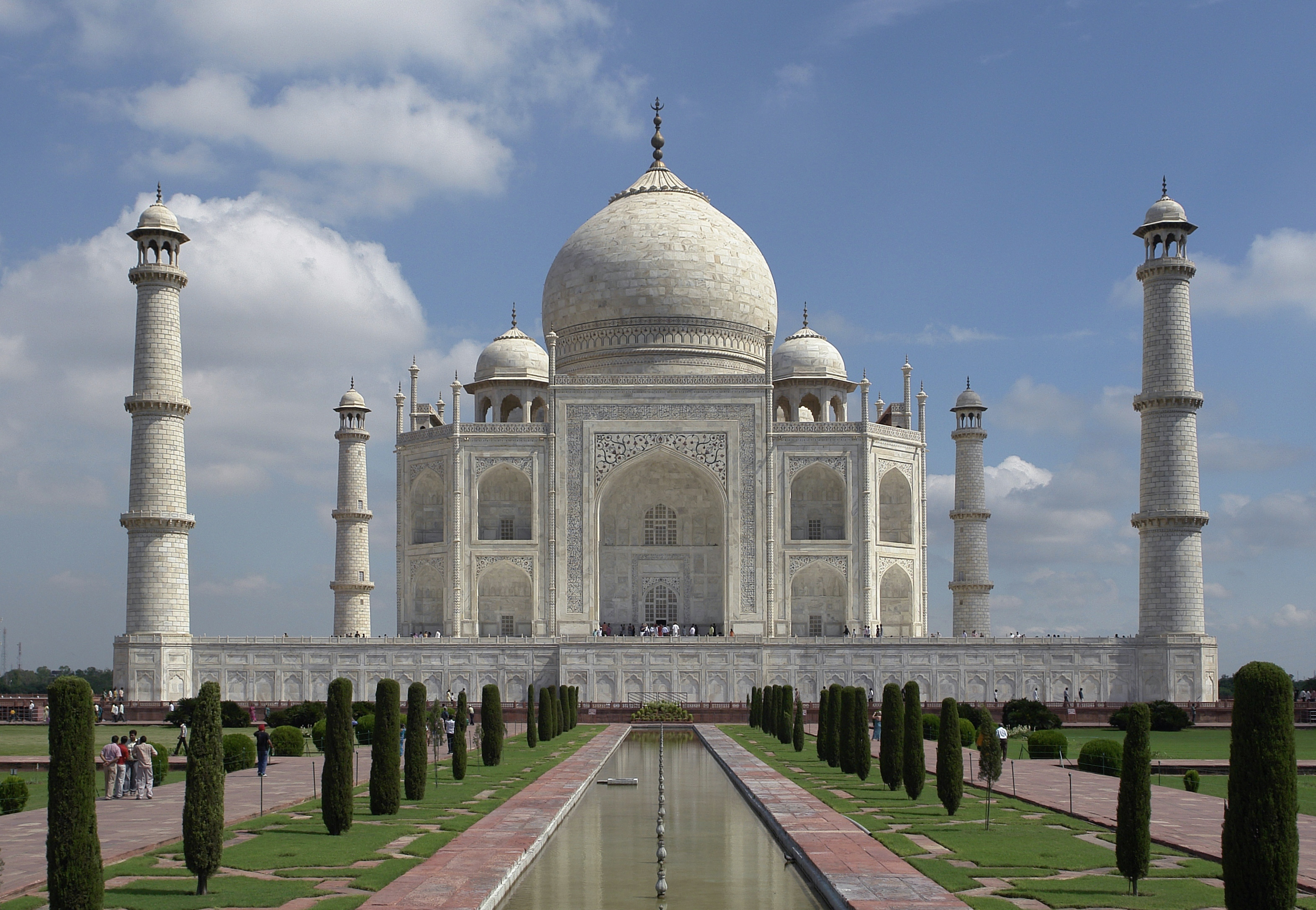
Taj Mahal, Agra, India, c.1649, by Ustad Ahmad Lahori

Due to the extent of the Islamic conquests, Islamic architecture encompasses a wide range of architectural styles from the foundation of Islam (7th century) to the present day. Early Islamic architecture was influenced by Roman, Byzantine, Persian, Mesopotamian architecture and all other lands which the Early Muslim conquests conquered in the 7th and 8th centuries. Further east, it was also influenced by Chinese and Indian architecture as Islam spread to Southeast Asia. This wide and long history has given rise to many local architectural styles, including but not limited to: Umayyad, Abbasid, Persian, Moorish, Fatimid, Mamluk, Ottoman, Indo-Islamic (particularly Mughal), Sino-Islamic and Sahelian architecture.

Some distinctive structures in Islamic architecture are mosques, madrasas, tombs, palaces, baths, and forts. Notable types of Islamic religious architecture include hypostyle mosques, domed mosques and mausoleums, structures with vaulted iwans, and madrasas built around central courtyards. In secular architecture, major examples of preserved historic palaces include the Alhambra and the Topkapi Palace. Islam does not encourage the worship of idols; therefore the architecture tends to be decorated with Arabic calligraphy (including Qur'anic verses or other poetry) and with more abstract motifs such as geometric patterns, muqarnas, and arabesques, as opposed to illustrations of scenes and stories.

== European ==
=== Medieval ===
Surviving examples of medieval secular architecture mainly served for defense across various parts of Europe. Castles and fortified walls provide the most notable remaining non-religious examples of medieval architecture. New types of civic, military, as well as religious buildings of new styles begin to pop up in this region during this period.

==== Byzantine ====
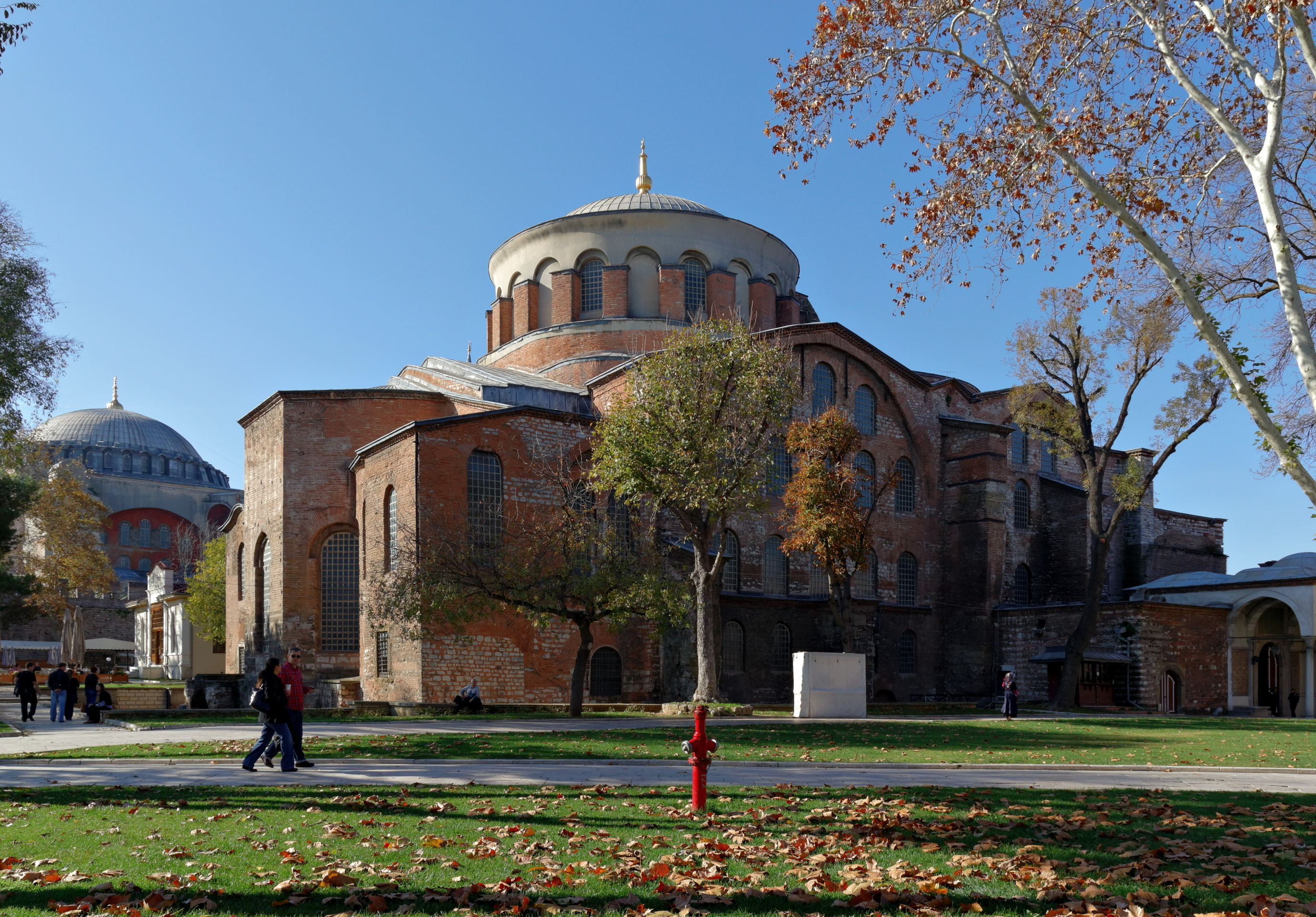
Hagia Irene, Istanbul, Turkey, unknown architect, 6th century

Hagia Sophia, Istanbul, by Anthemius of Tralles and Isidore of Miletus, 537

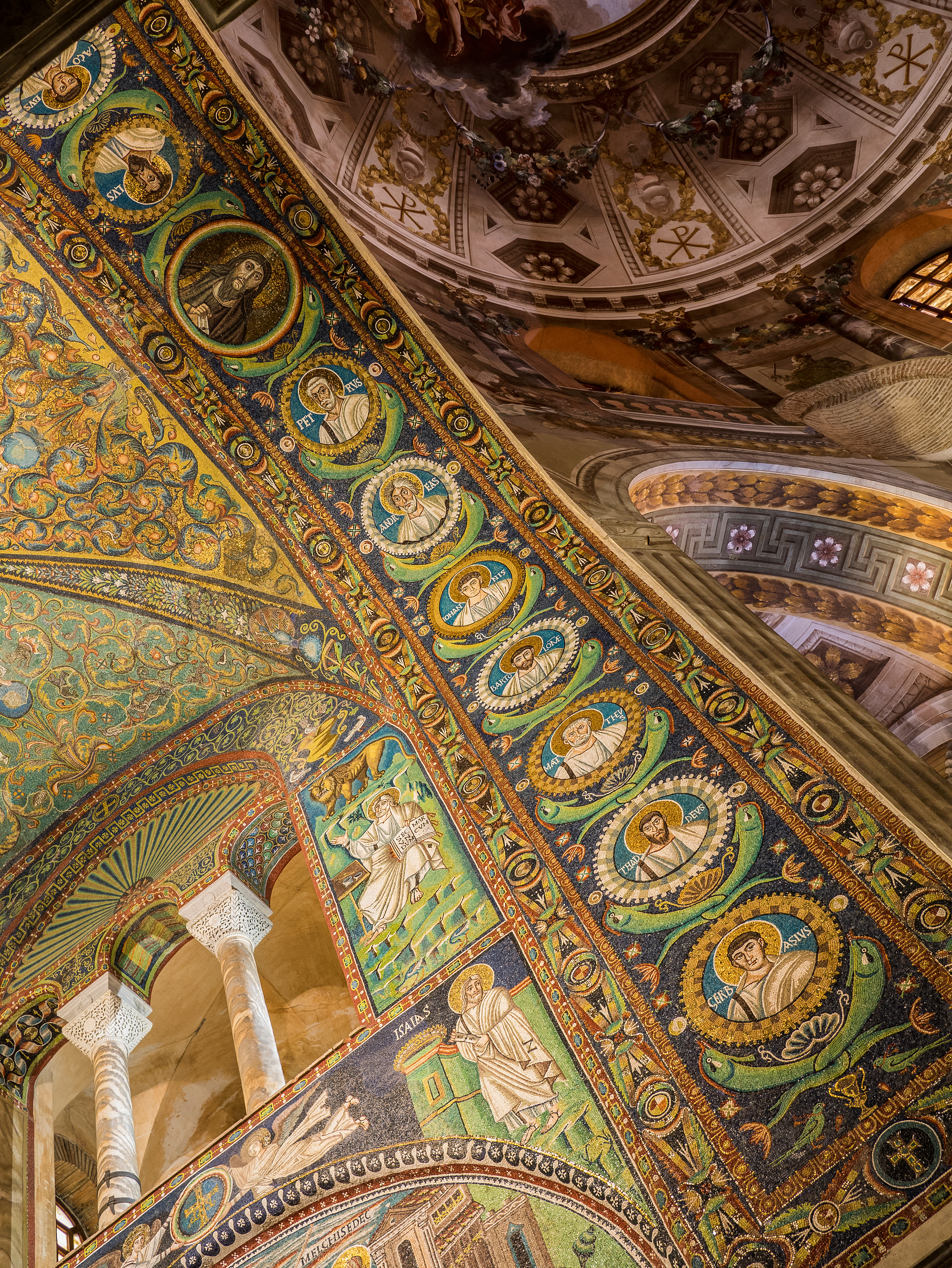
Basilica of San Vitale, Ravenna, Italy, unknown architect, 527-548

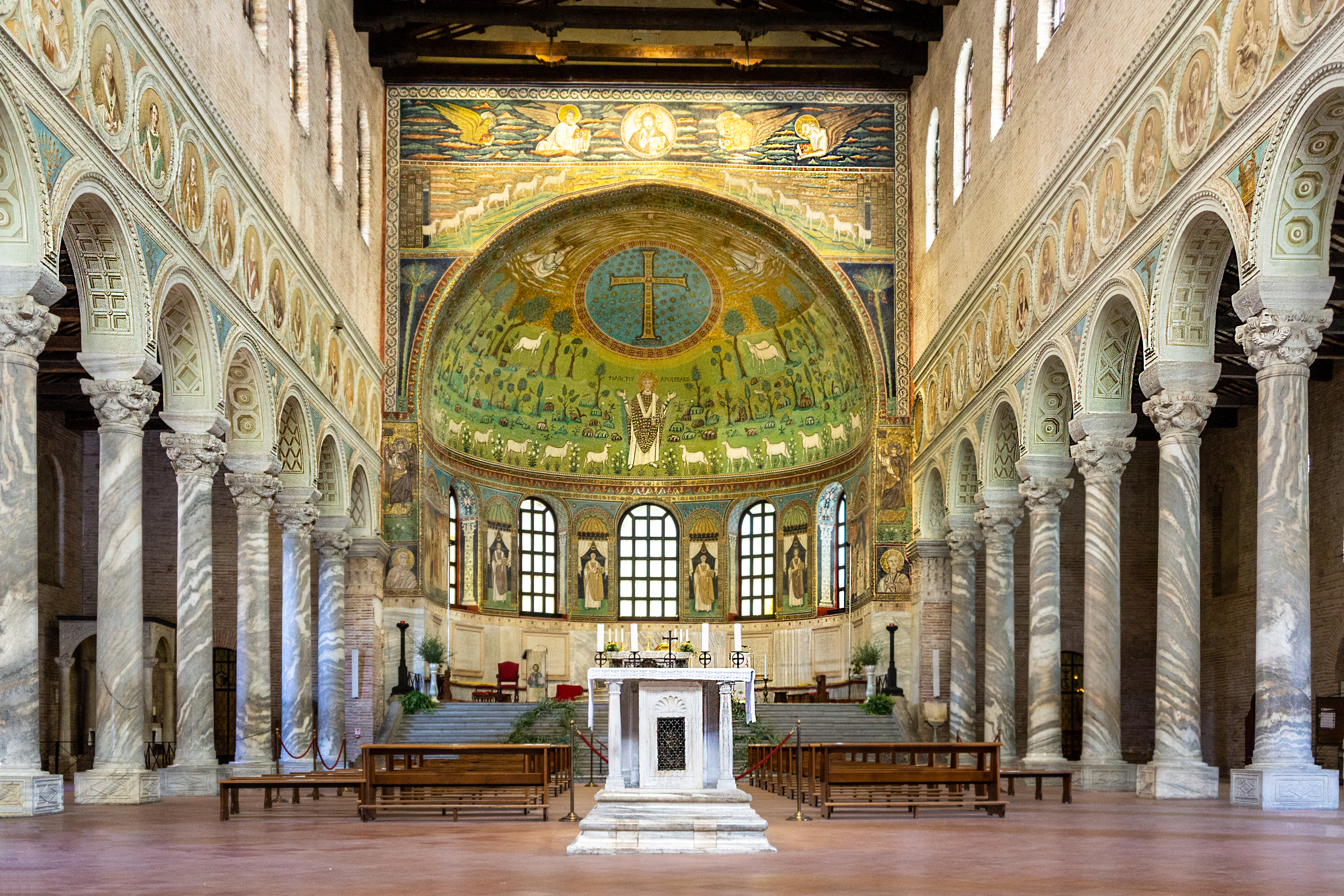
Basilica of Sant'Apollinare in Classe, Ravenna, unknown architect, 549

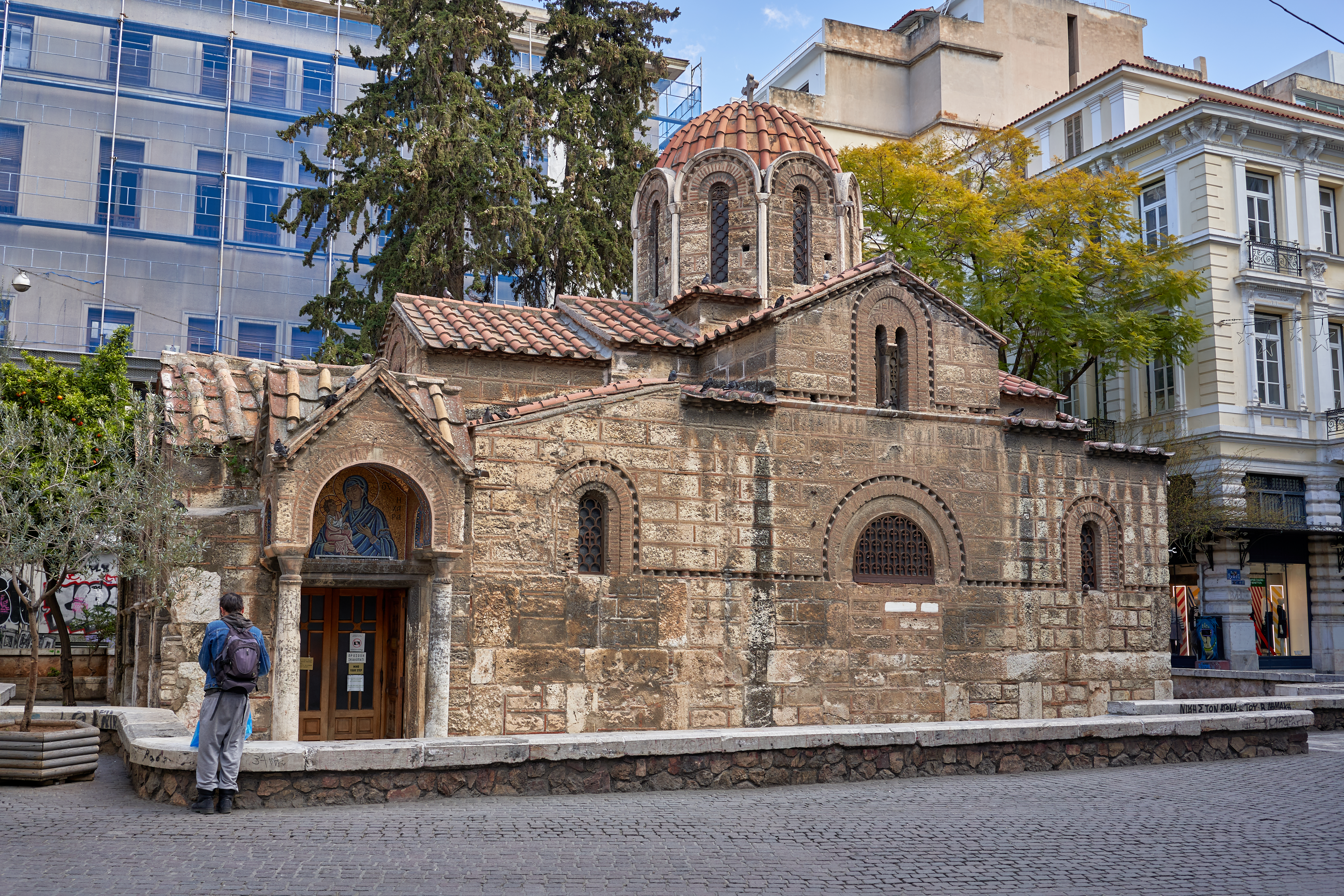
Kapnikarea, Athens, unknown architect, 1050

Byzantine architects built city walls, palaces, hippodromes, bridges, aqueducts, and churches. They built many types of churches, including the basilica (the most widespread type, and the one that reached the greatest development). After the early period, the most common layout was the cross-in-square with five domes, also found in Moscow, Novgorod or Kiev, as well as in Romania, Bulgaria, Serbia, North Macedonia and Albania. Through modifications and adaptations of local inspiration, the Byzantine style will be used as the main source of inspiration for architectural styles in all Eastern Orthodox countries. For example, in Romania, the Brâncovenesc style is highly based on Byzantine architecture, but also has individual Romanian characteristics.

Just as the Parthenon is the most famous building of Ancient Greek architecture, Hagia Sophia remains the iconic church of Orthodox Christianity. In Greek and Roman temples, the exterior was the most important part of the temple, where sacrifices were made; the interior, where the cult statue of the deity to whom the temple was built was kept, often had limited access by the general public. But Christian liturgies are held in the interior of the churches, Byzantine exteriors usually have little if any ornamentation.

Byzantine architecture often featured marble columns, coffered ceilings and sumptuous decoration, including the extensive use of mosaics with golden backgrounds. The building material used by Byzantine architects was no longer marble, which was very appreciated by the Ancient Greeks. They used mostly stone and brick, and also thin alabaster sheets for windows. Mosaics were used to cover brick walls, and any other surface where fresco would not resist. Good examples of mosaics from the proto-Byzantine era are in Hagios Demetrios in Thessaloniki (Greece), the Basilica of Sant'Apollinare Nuovo and the Basilica of San Vitale, both in Ravenna (Italy), and Hagia Sophia in Istanbul.

==== Armenia ====
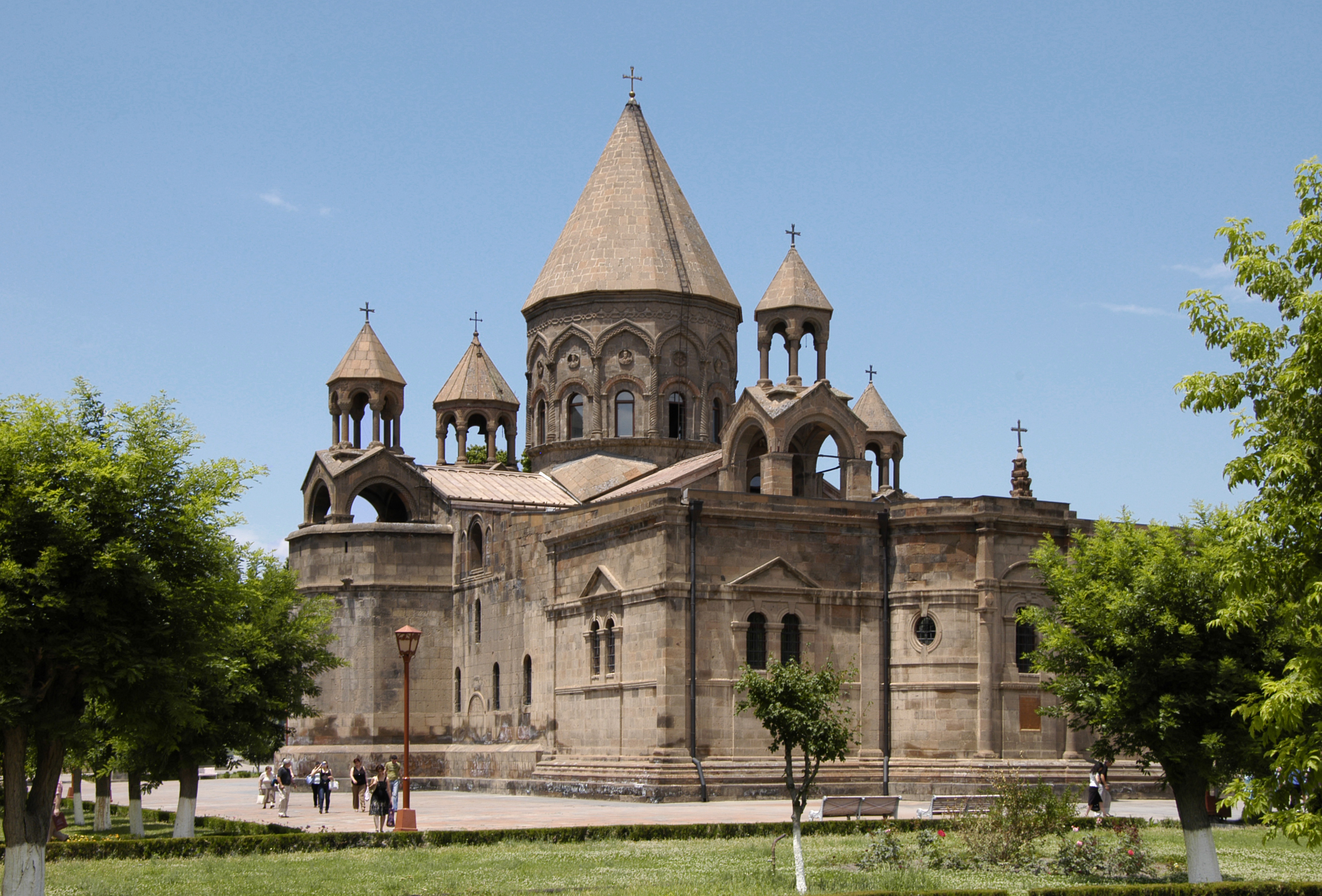
Etchmiadzin Cathedral, Vagarshapat, by Gregory the Illuminator, 301-1868

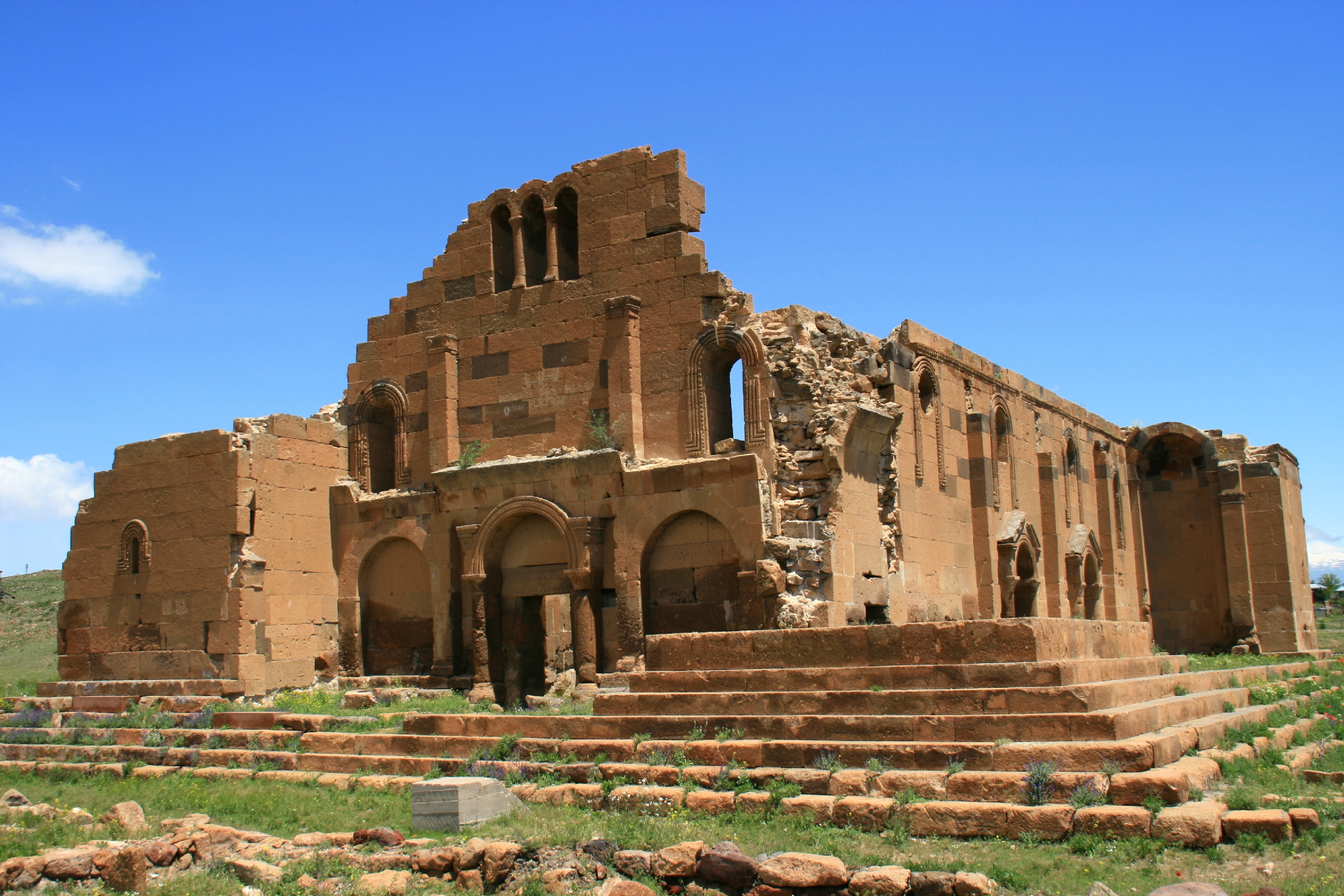
Yererouk, Anipemza, 4th-5th centuries

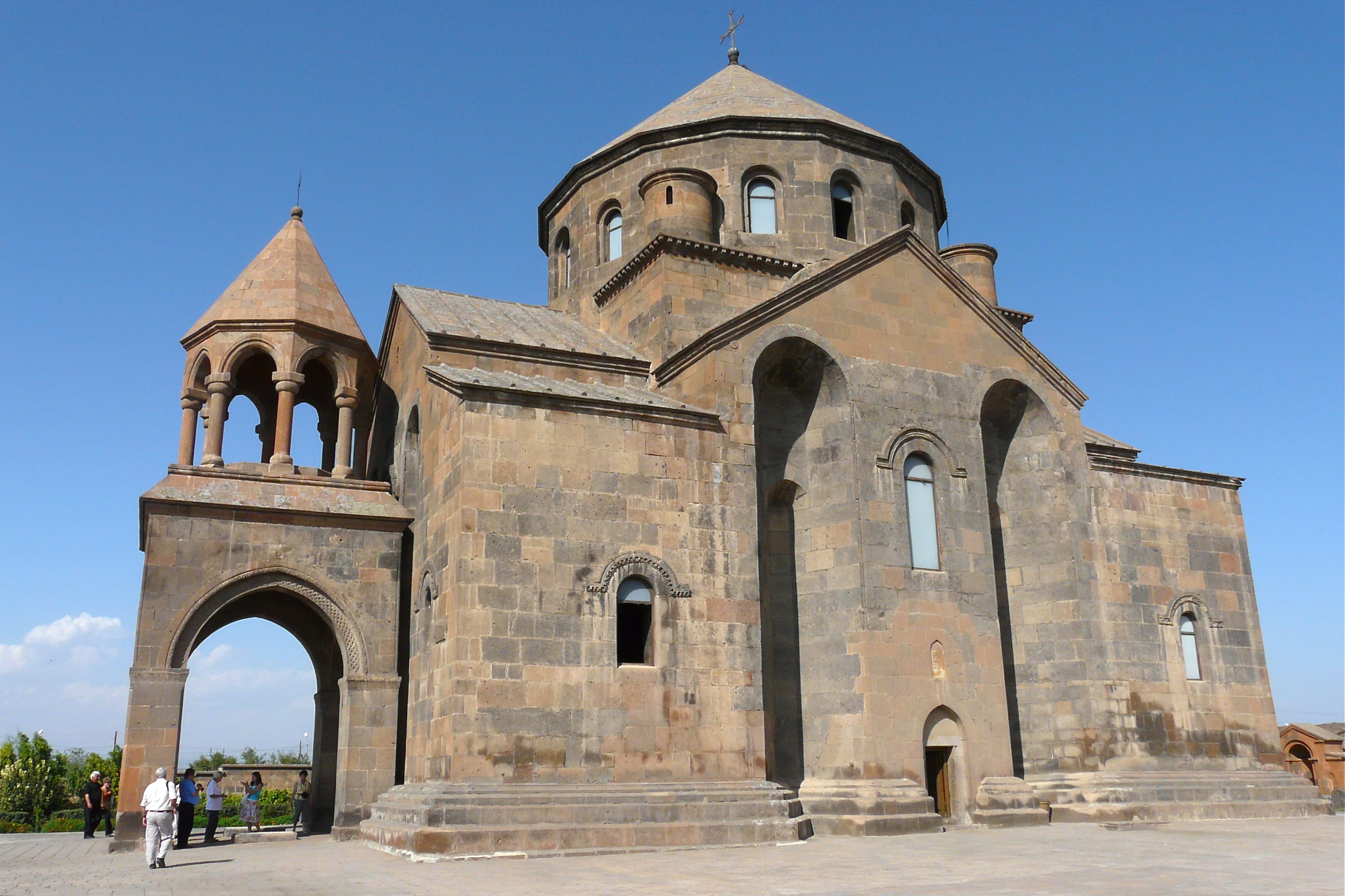
Saint Hripsime Church, Vagarshapat, by Komitas Aghtsetsi, 618

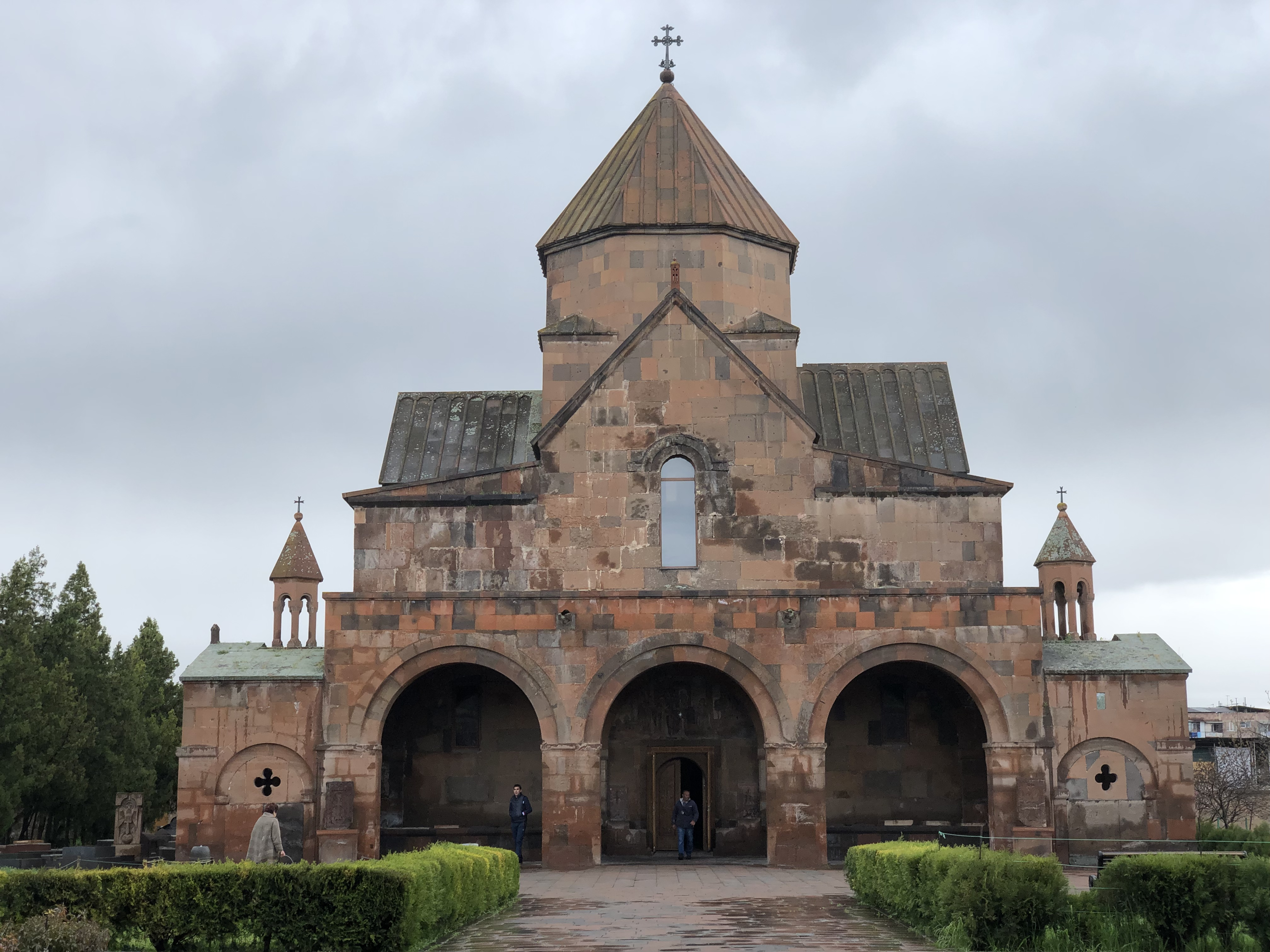
Saint Gayane Church, Vagarshapat, by Ezra I, 630

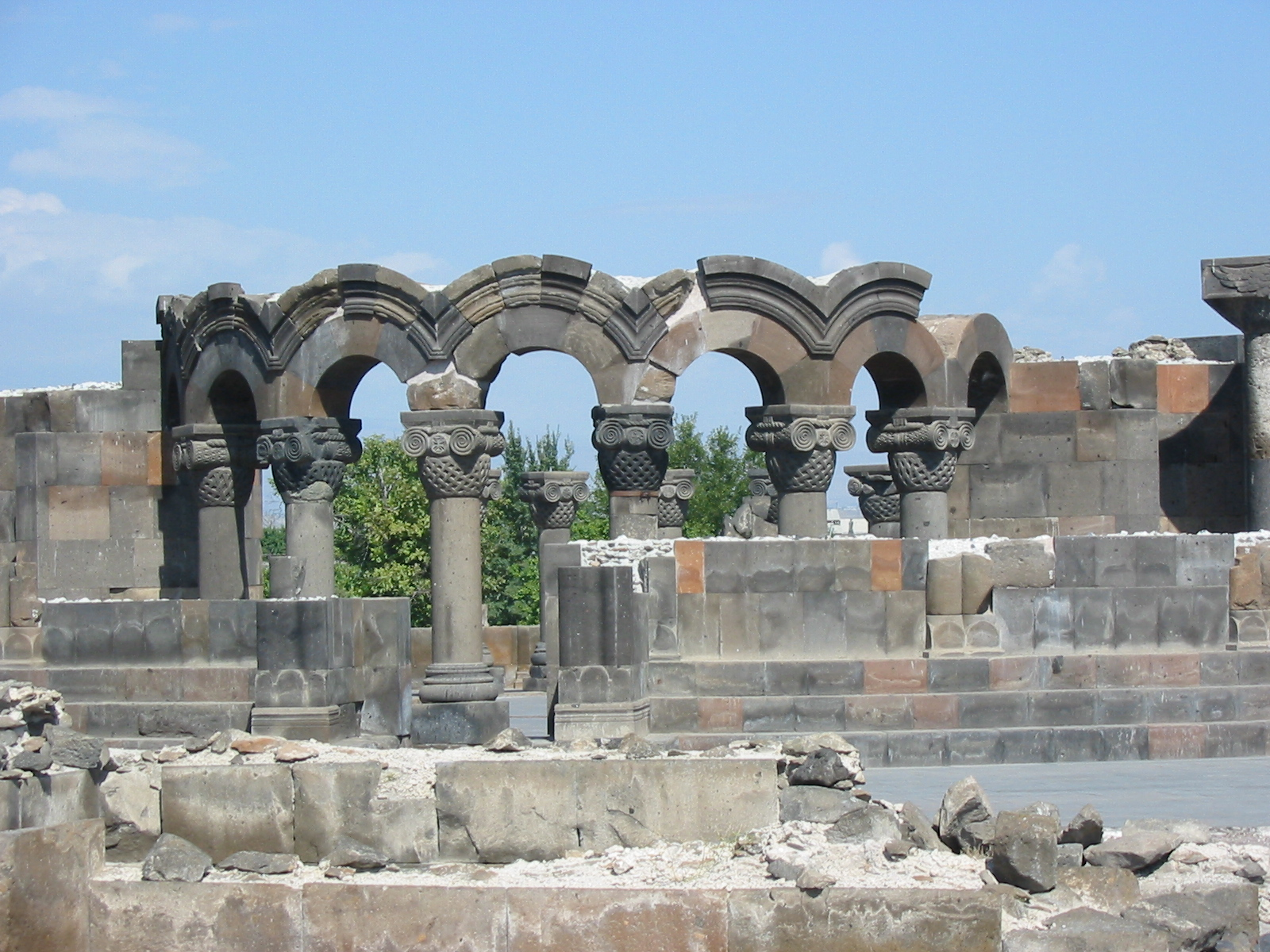
Zvartnots Cathedral ruins, Vagarshapat, Nerses III the Builder, 643-652

From the very beginning of the formation of feudal relations, the architecture and urban planning of Armenia entered a new stage. The ancient Armenian cities experienced economic decline; only Artashat and Tigranakert retained their importance. The importance of the cities of Dvin and Karin (Erzurum) increased. The construction of the city of Arshakavan by the king of Great Armenia Arshak II was not completely completed. Christianity brought to life a new architecture of religious buildings, which was initially nourished by the traditions of the old, ancient architecture.

Churches of the 4th-5th centuries are mainly basilicas (Kasakh, 4th-5th centuries, Ashtarak, 5th century, Akhts, 4th century, Yeghvard, 5th century). Some basilicas of Armenian architecture belong to the so-called "Western type" of basilica churches. Of these, the most famous are the churches of Tekor (5th century), Yererouk (4th-5th centuries), Dvin (470), Tsitsernavank (IV-5 centuries). The three-nave Yereruyk basilica stands on a 6-step stylobate, presumably built on the site of an earlier pre-Christian temple. Other examples include the basilicas of Karnut (5th century), Yeghvard (5th century), Garni (4th century), Zovuni (5th century), Tsaghkavank (6th century), Dvina (553–557), Tallinn (5th century), Tanaat (491), Jarjaris (4th-5th centuries), Lernakert (4th-5th centuries).

==== Carolingian and Ottonian ====
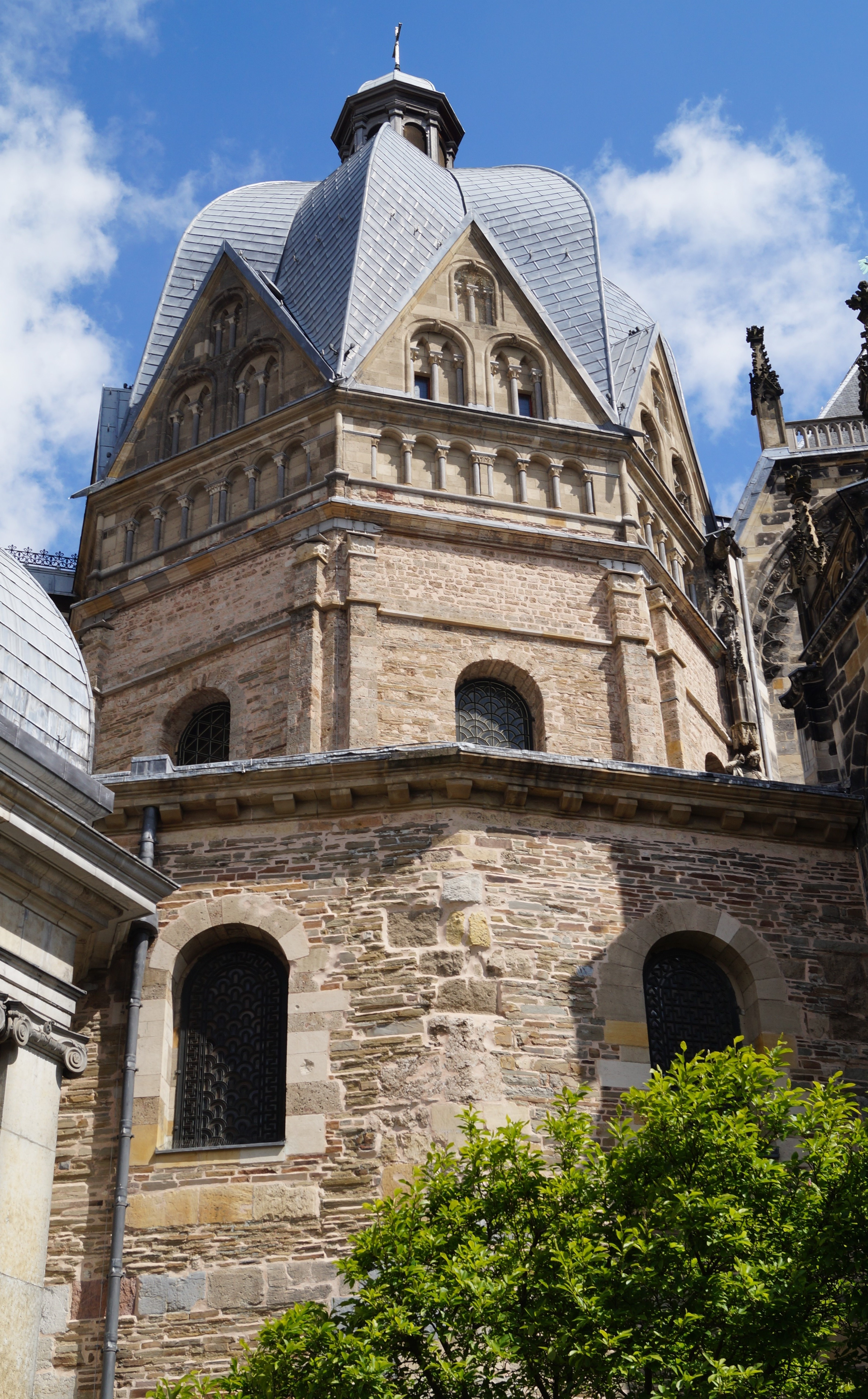
Charlemagne's palace chapel, Aachen, Germany, Odo of Metz, 768–814

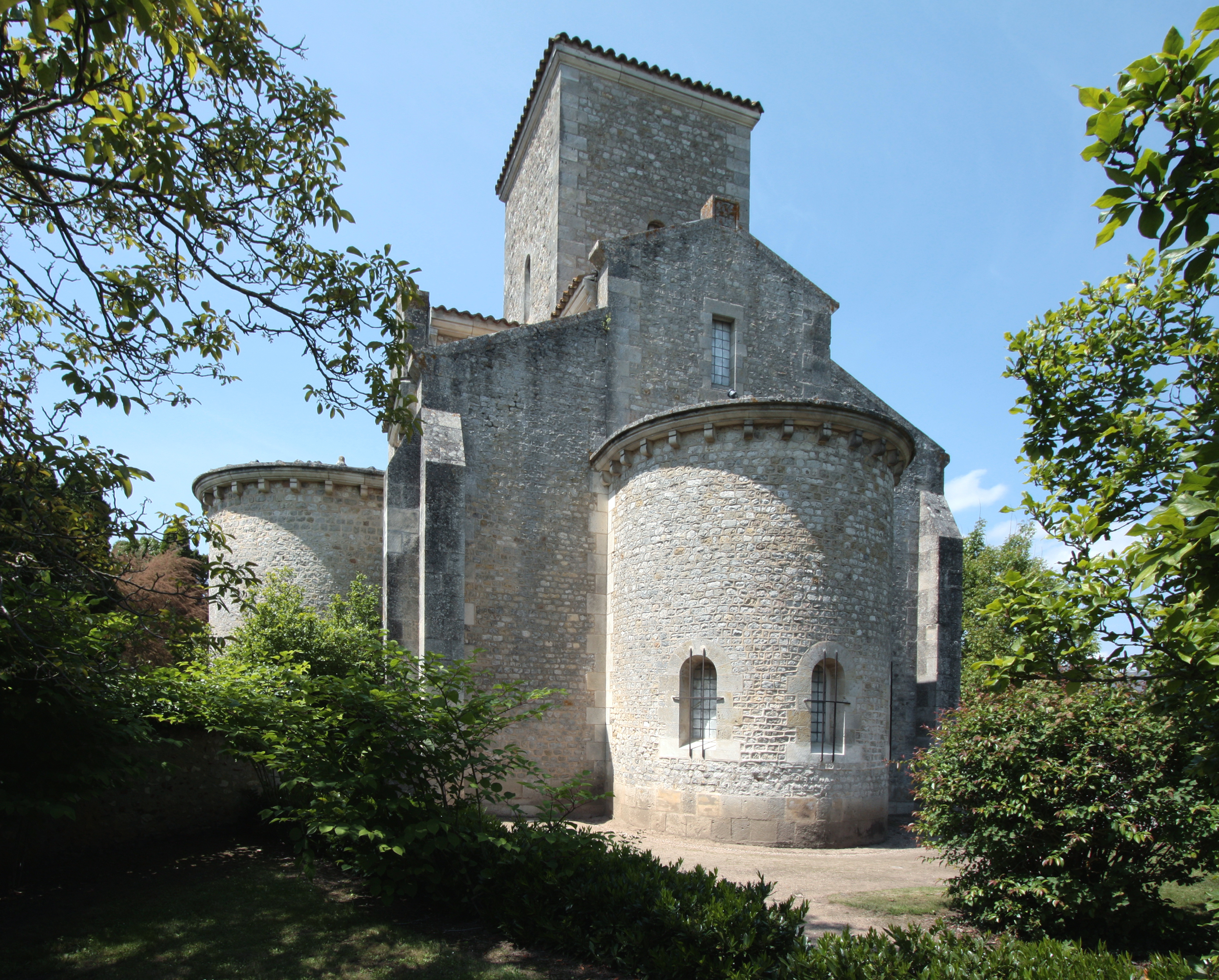
The church of Germigny-des-Prés in 806–811

Lorsch Abbey gatehouse, Lorsch, unknown architect c. 800

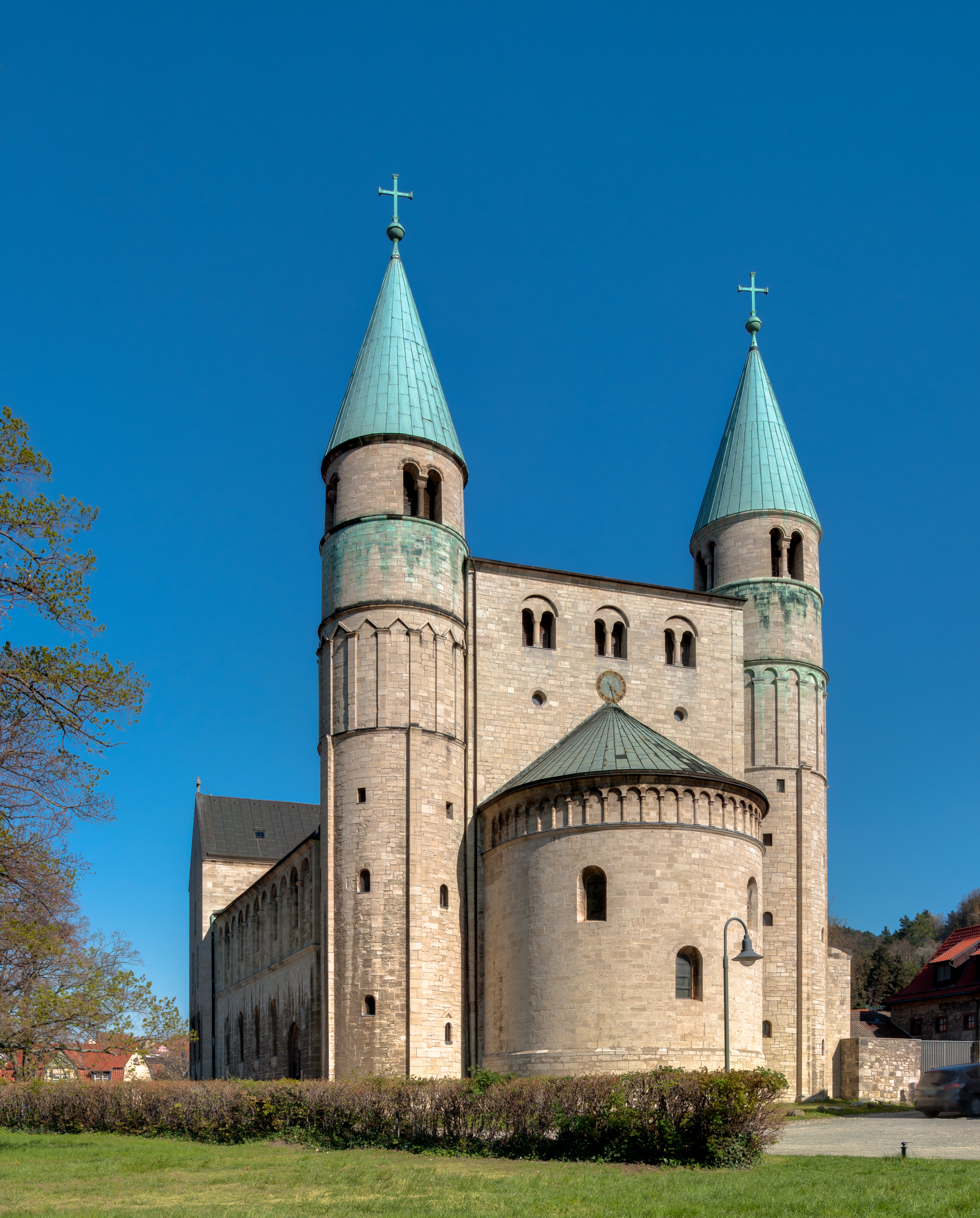
Saint Cyriakus, Gernrode church, Gernrode, unknown architect, c. 959/960-1014

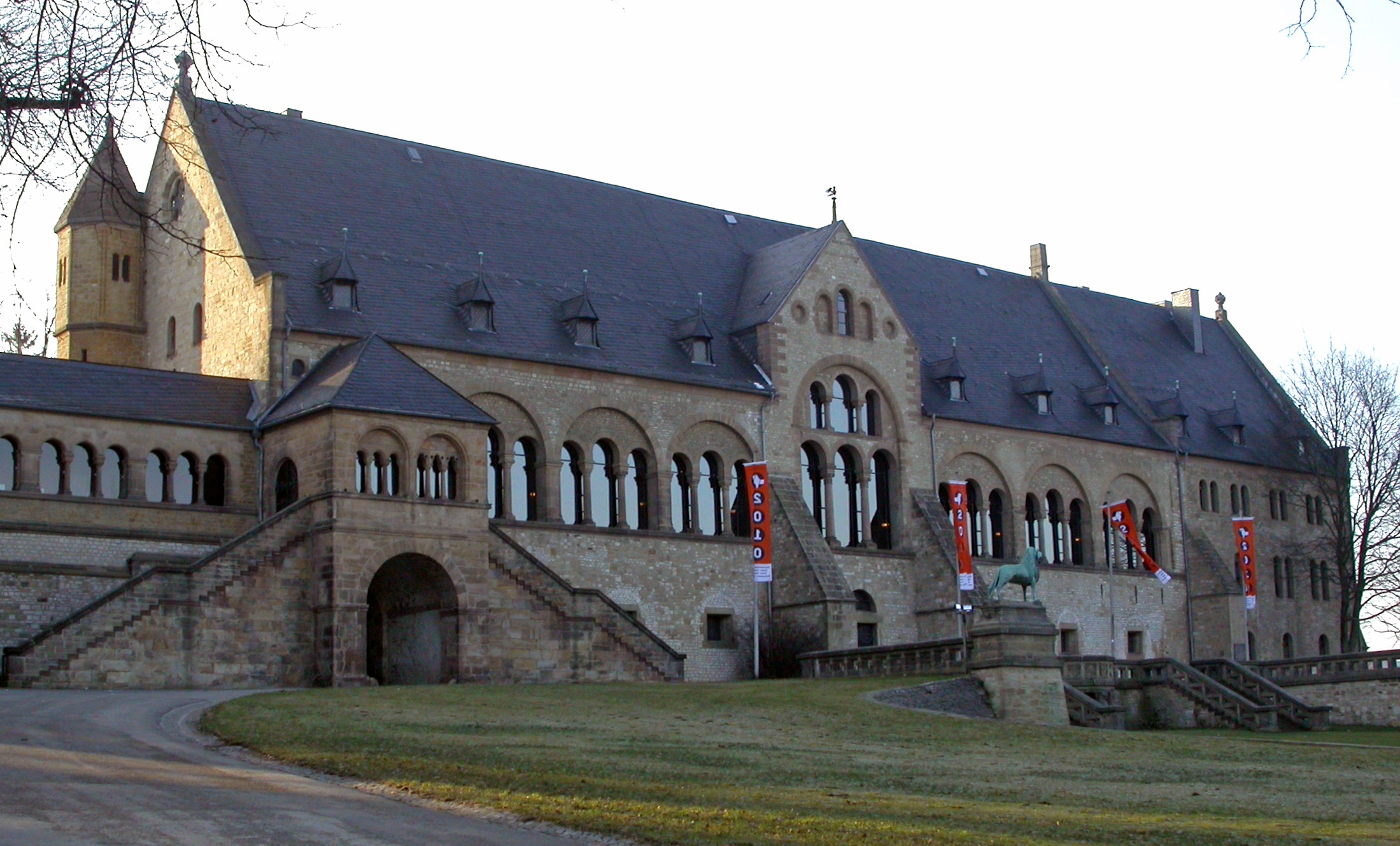
Imperial Palace of Goslar, Goslar, unknown architect, c.1040-1050

Carolingian architecture refers to the style of the Carolingian Empire, particularly under Charlemagne 768–814 and his successors. It is considered a revival of Roman architectural forms, blending the classical heritage of the Roman Empire with new Christian ideals.

Churches followed the Roman basilica plan, with a long, rectangular nave, aisles, and an apse. Charlemagne's Palatine Chapel at Aachen is a prime example, with its octagonal shape influenced by early Christian and Byzantine architecture.

Carolingian architects used barrel vaults and groin vaults, inspired by Roman engineering, to create large, stable roofs. The Palatine Chapel in Aachen (792–797) is known for its ribbed vaulting.

Columns, arches, and entablatures were borrowed from Roman architecture. Churches were designed to express the divine order, reflecting the Carolingian Empire's Christian imperial ideals.

Ottonian architecture evolved during the reign of the Ottonian dynasty (c. 919–1024 AD). This style was marked by both the continuation of Carolingian forms and the integration of new Byzantine and Romanesque elements.

Ottonian churches often retained a basilica plan but expanded it with double aisles or additional chapels.

The westwork—a monumental, fortress-like façade—became a characteristic feature of Ottonian churches. The Church of Saint Cyriakus at Gernrode features an iconic westwork with towers and a large entrance. The first church towers developed out of westworks.

The Ottonians advanced vaulting techniques and used crypts more extensively. Magdeburg Cathedral (c. 1200) was one of the key buildings of this period, symbolizing imperial power and Christian devotion.

Ottonian architecture was known for its elaborate mosaics, frescoes, and sculptures that incorporated both Byzantine and local traditions. Manuscripts from the period also show the richness of Ottonian visual culture.

Ottonian rulers built grand palaces, continuing the Carolingian legacy of the Aachen Palace, but with added sophistication. The Imperial Palace of Goslar and other imperial buildings reinforced the emperor's authority.

The Carolingian and Ottonian styles were precursors of the Romanesque style.

==== Romanesque ====
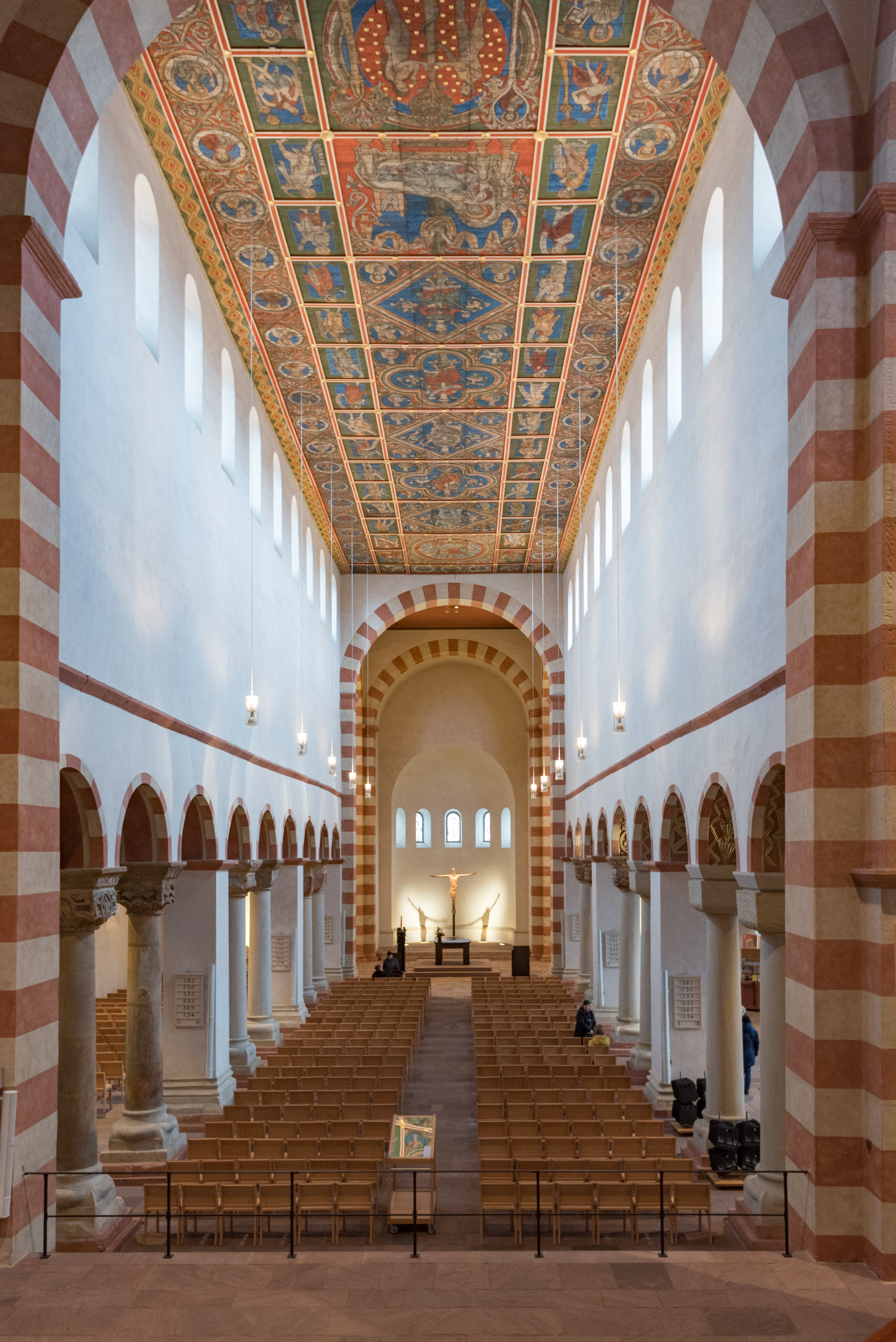
St. Michael's Church, Hildesheim, Germany, unknown architect, 1010-1031

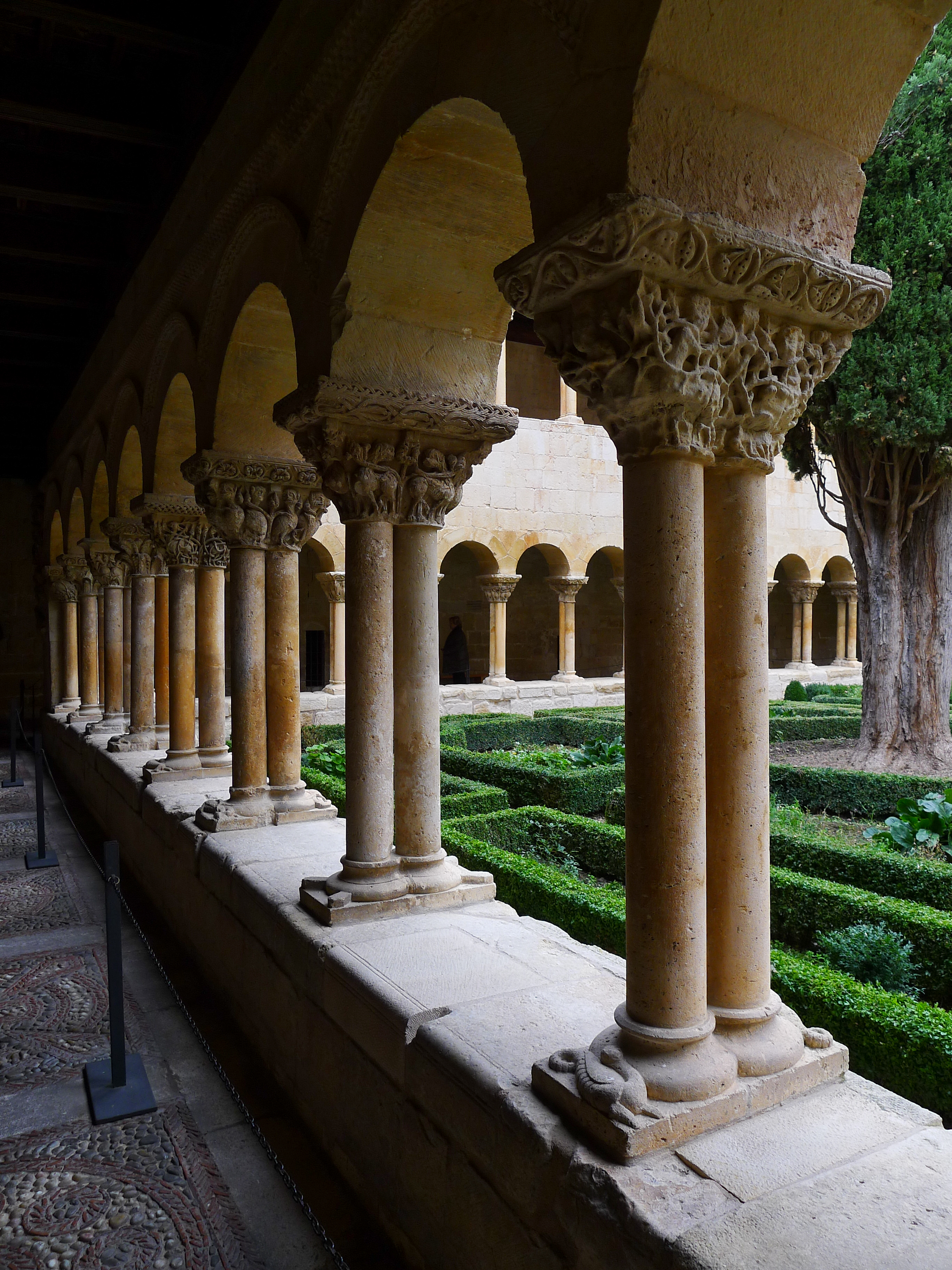
Portico of the Abbey of Santo Domingo de Silos, Santo Domingo de Silos, Spain, unknown architect, begun in 1085

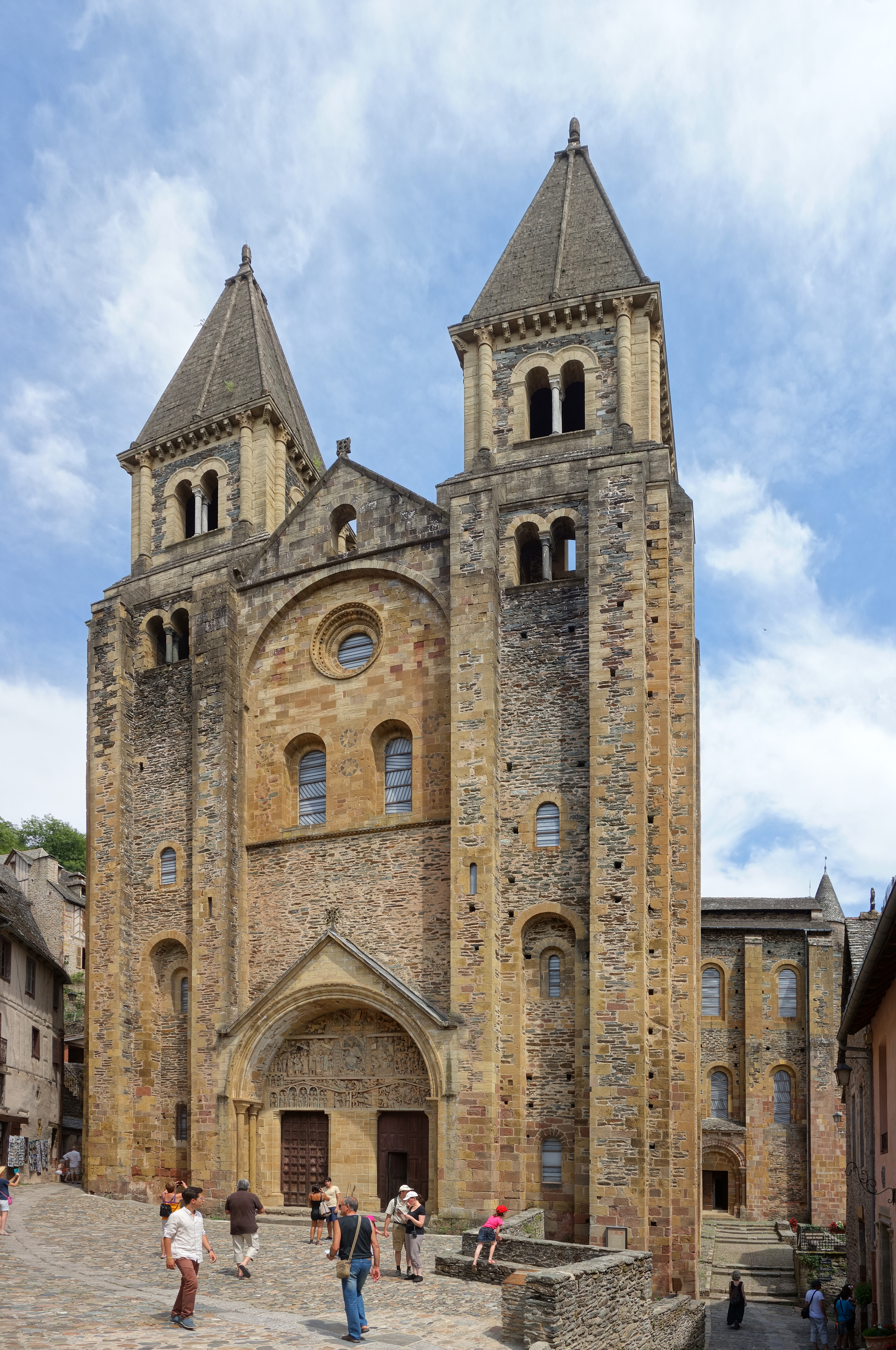
Abbey Church of Sainte-Foy, Conques, France, unknown architect, 1087-1107

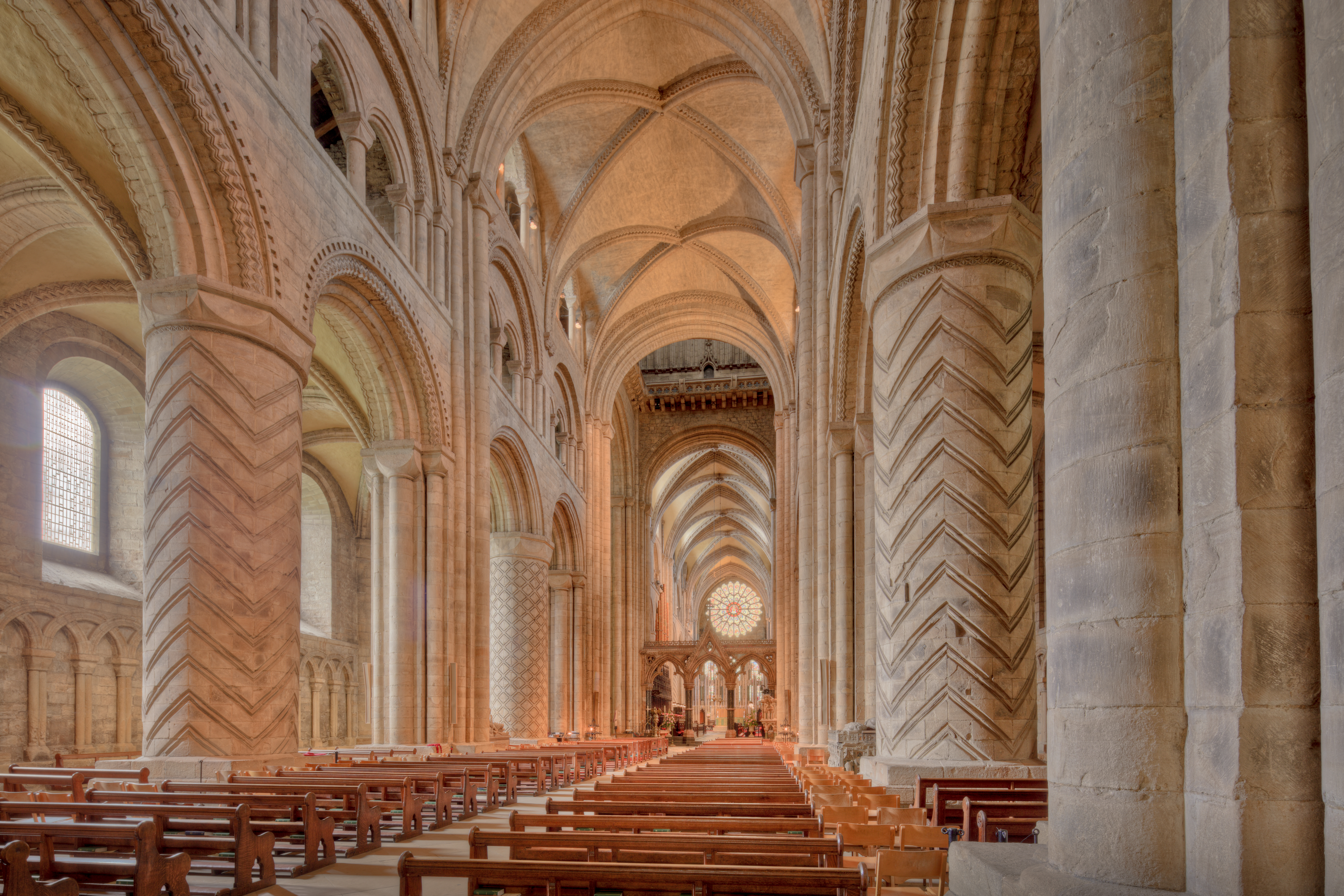
Interior of the Durham Cathedral, Durham, UK, unknown architect, 1093-1133

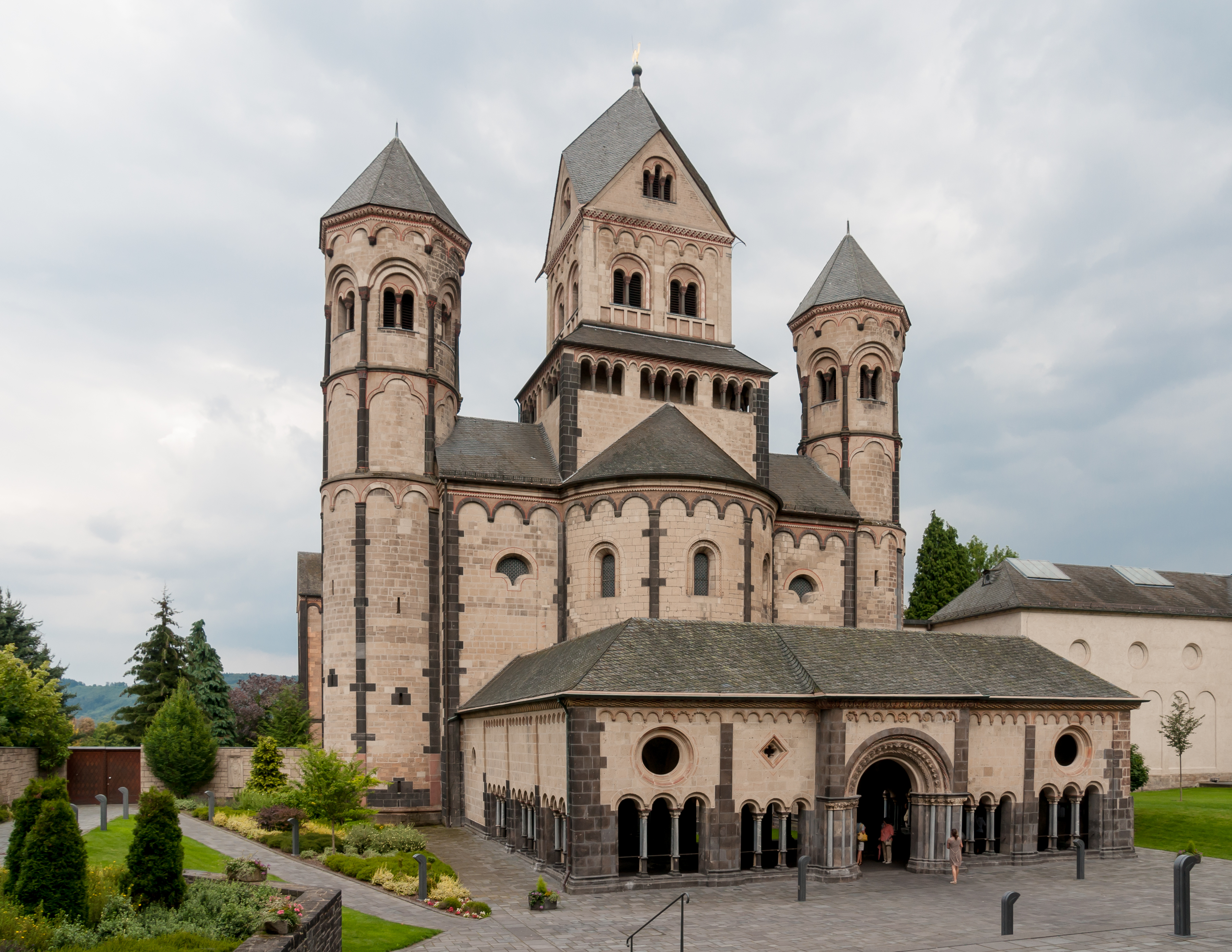
Maria Laach Abbey, Glees, Germany, unknown architect, 1093-1230

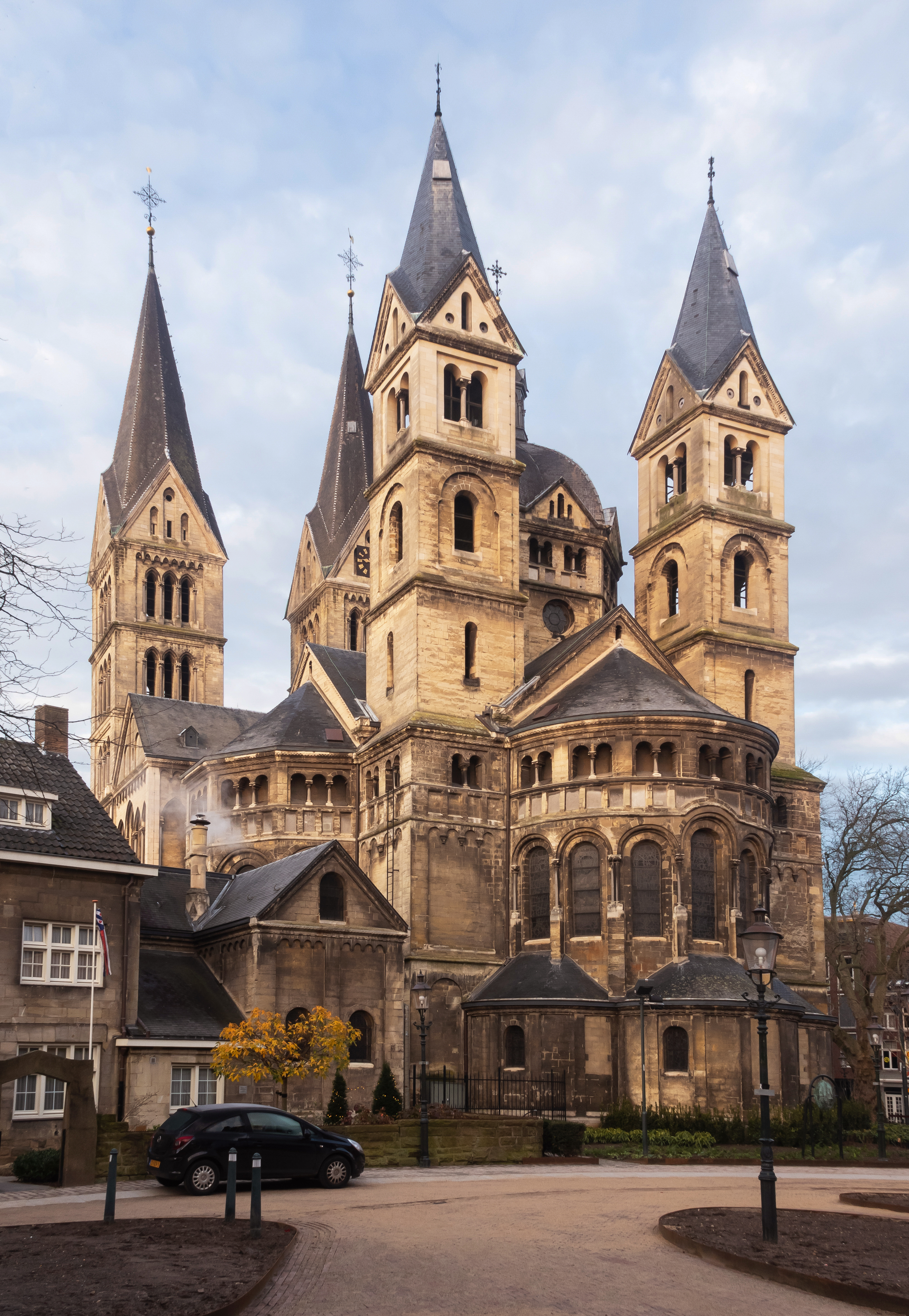
Munsterkerk, Roermond, The Netherlands, unknown architect, 1220

The term 'Romanesque' is rooted in the 19th century, when it was coined to describe medieval churches built from the 10th to 12th century, before the rise of steeply pointed arches, flying buttresses and other Gothic elements. This style of architecture emerged nearly simultaneously in multiple countries (France, Germany, Italy, Spain). For 19th-century critics, the Romanesque reflected the architecture of stonemasons who evidently admired the heavy barrel vaults and intricate carved capitals of the ancient Romans, but whose own architecture was considered derivative and degenerate, lacking the sophistication of their classical models.

Scholars in the 21st century are less inclined to understand the architecture of this period as a 'failure' to reproduce the achievements of the past, and are far more likely to recognise its profusion of experimental forms, as a series of creative new inventions. At the time, however, research has questioned the value of Romanesque as a stylistic term. On the surface, it provides a convenient designation for buildings that share a common vocabulary of rounded arches and thick stone masonry, and appear in between the Carolingian revival of classical antiquity in the 9th century and the swift evolution of Gothic architecture after the second half of the 12th century. One problem, however, is that the term encompasses a broad array of regional variations, some with closer links to Rome than others. It should also be noted that the distinction between Romanesque architecture and its immediate predecessors and followers is not at all clear. There is little evidence that medieval viewers were concerned with the stylistic distinctions that we observe today, making the slow evolution of medieval architecture difficult to separate into neat chronological categories. Nevertheless, Romanesque remains a useful word despite its limitations, because it reflects a period of intensive building activity that maintained some continuity with the classical past, but freely reinterpreted ancient forms in a new distinctive manner.

Romanesque cathedrals can be easily differentiated from Gothic and Byzantine ones, since they are characterized by the wide use of thick piers and columns, round arches and severity. Here, the possibilities of the round-arch arcade in both a structural and a spatial sense were once again exploited to the full. Unlike the sharp pointed arch of the later Gothic, the Romanesque round arch required the support of massive piers and columns. In comparison to Byzantine churches, Romanesque ones tend to lack complex ornamentation both on the exterior and interior. An example of this is the Périgueux Cathedral (Périgueux, France), built in the early 12th century and designed on the model of St. Mark's Basilica in Venice, but lacking mosaics, leaving its interior very austere and minimalistic.

==== Gothic ====
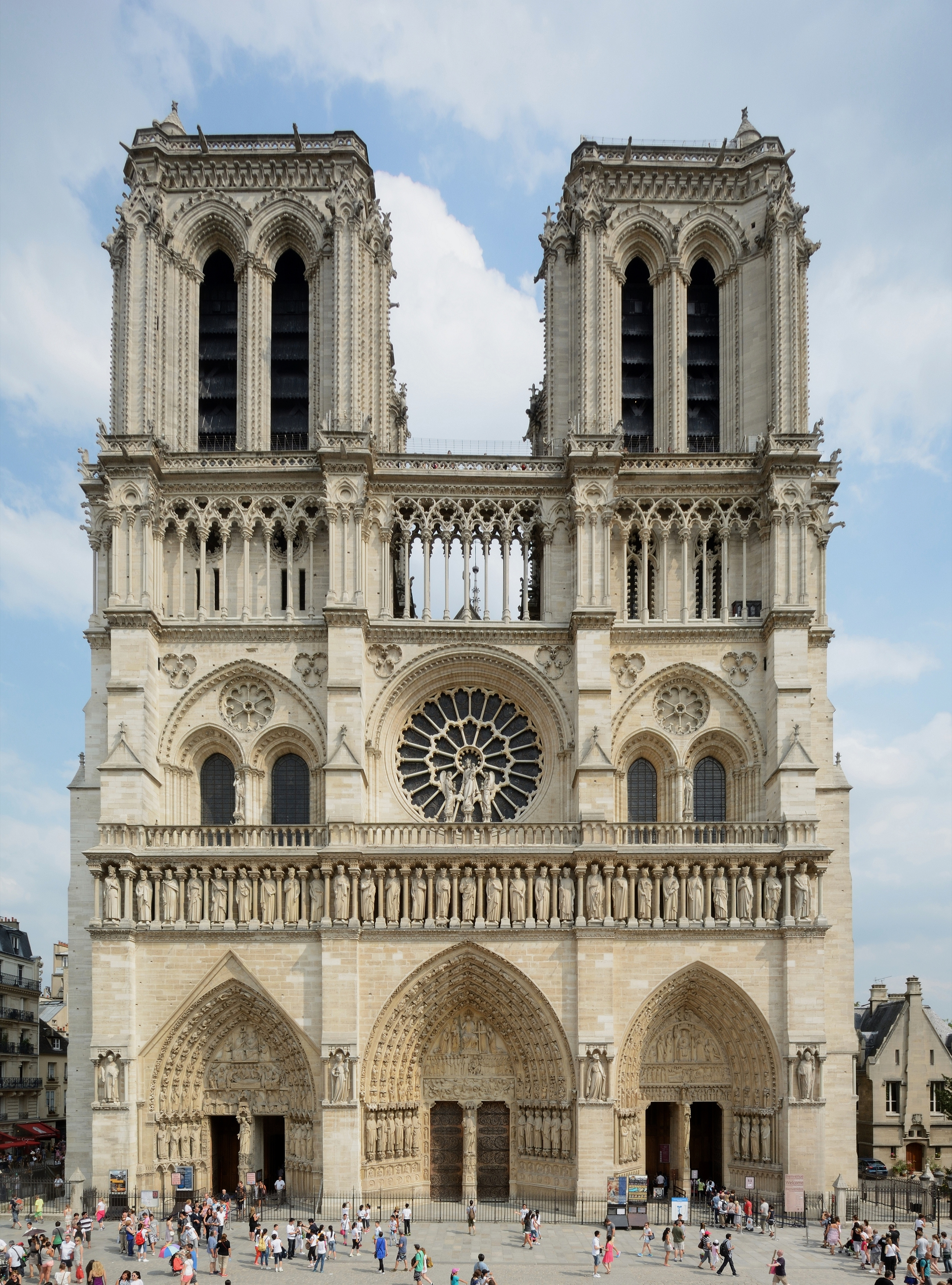
Notre-Dame Cathedral, Paris, by various architects, begun in 1163

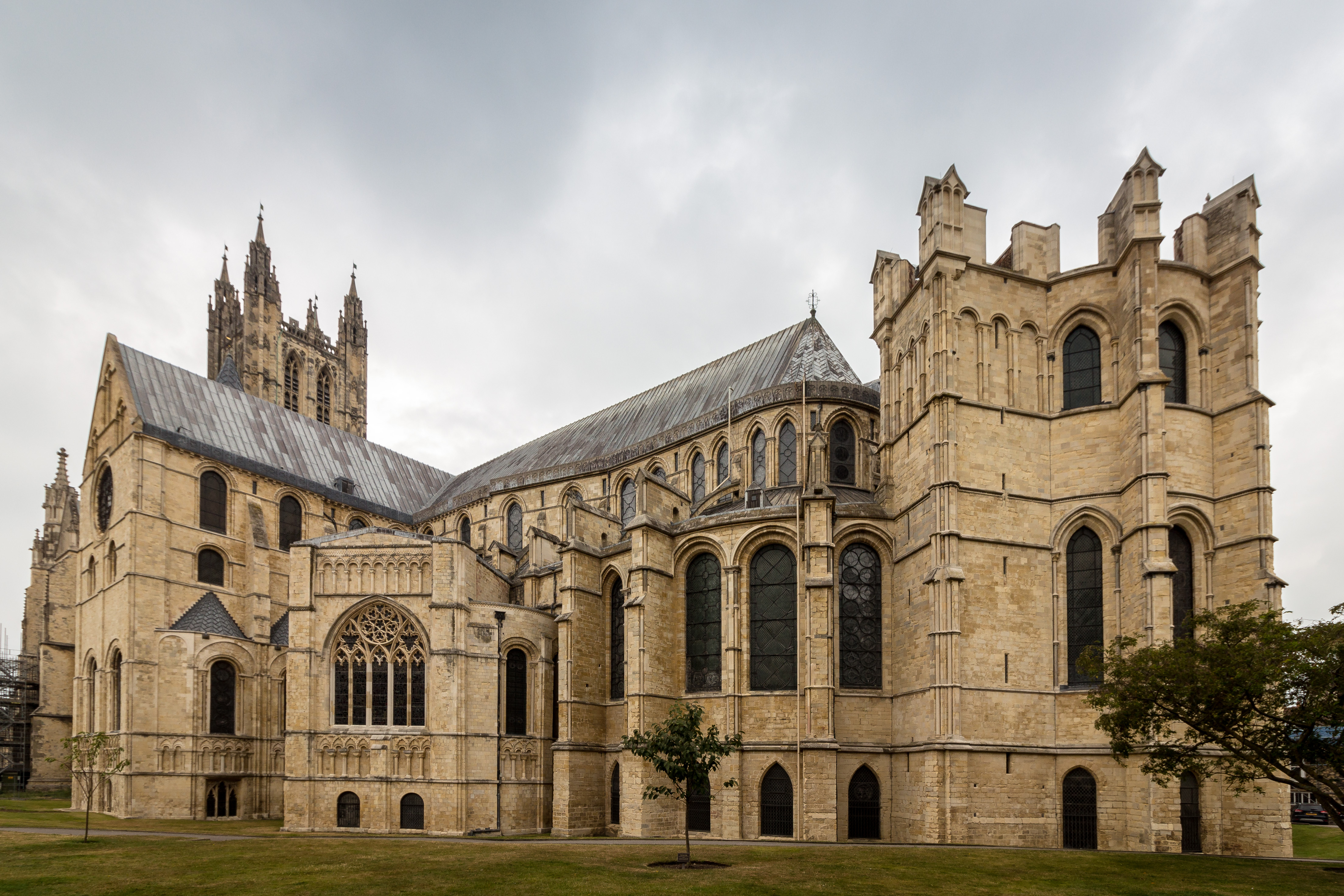
Canterbury Cathedral, Canterbury, Kent, UK, by William of Sens, c.1174–1184

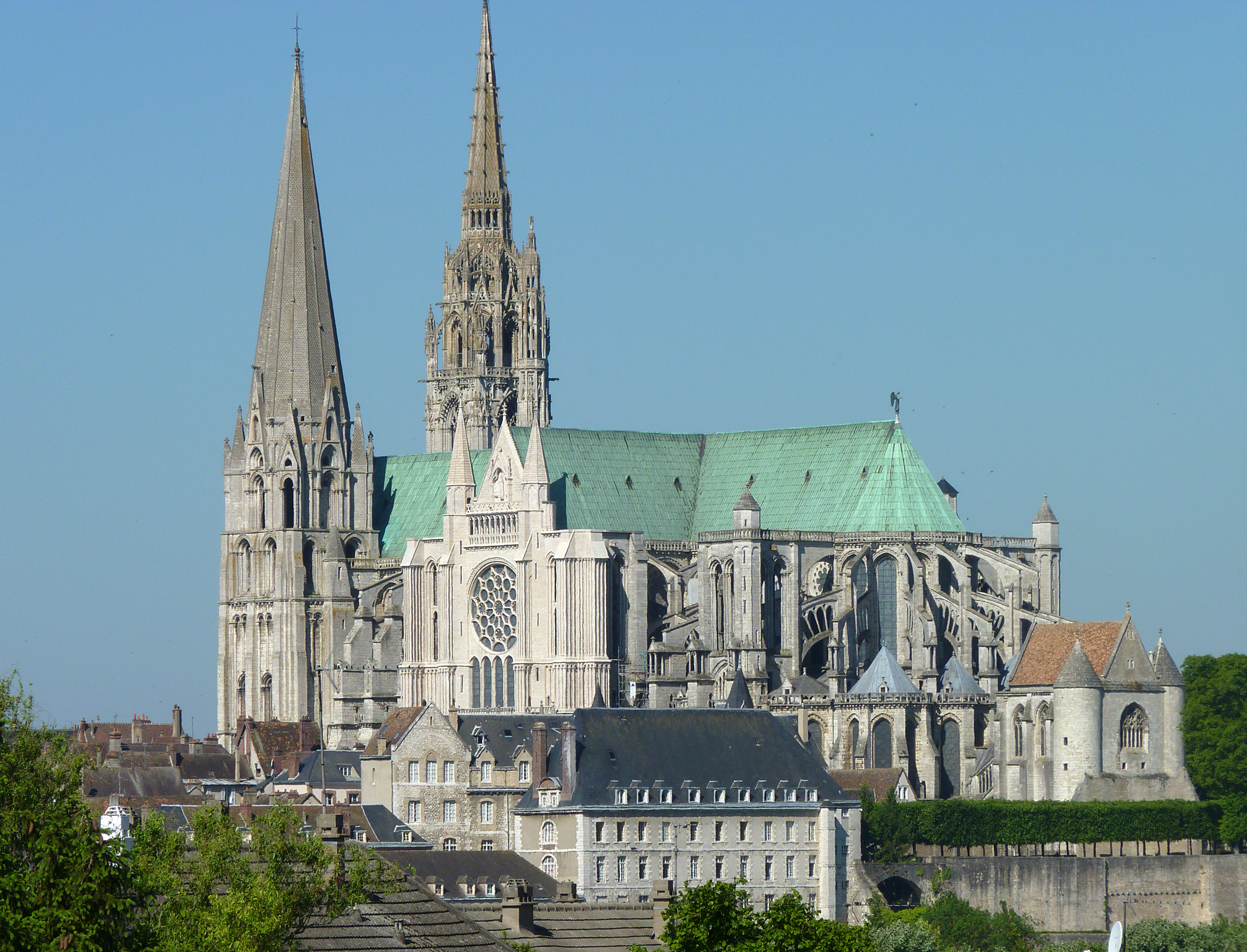
Chartres Cathedral, Chartres, France, unknown architect, 1194-1250

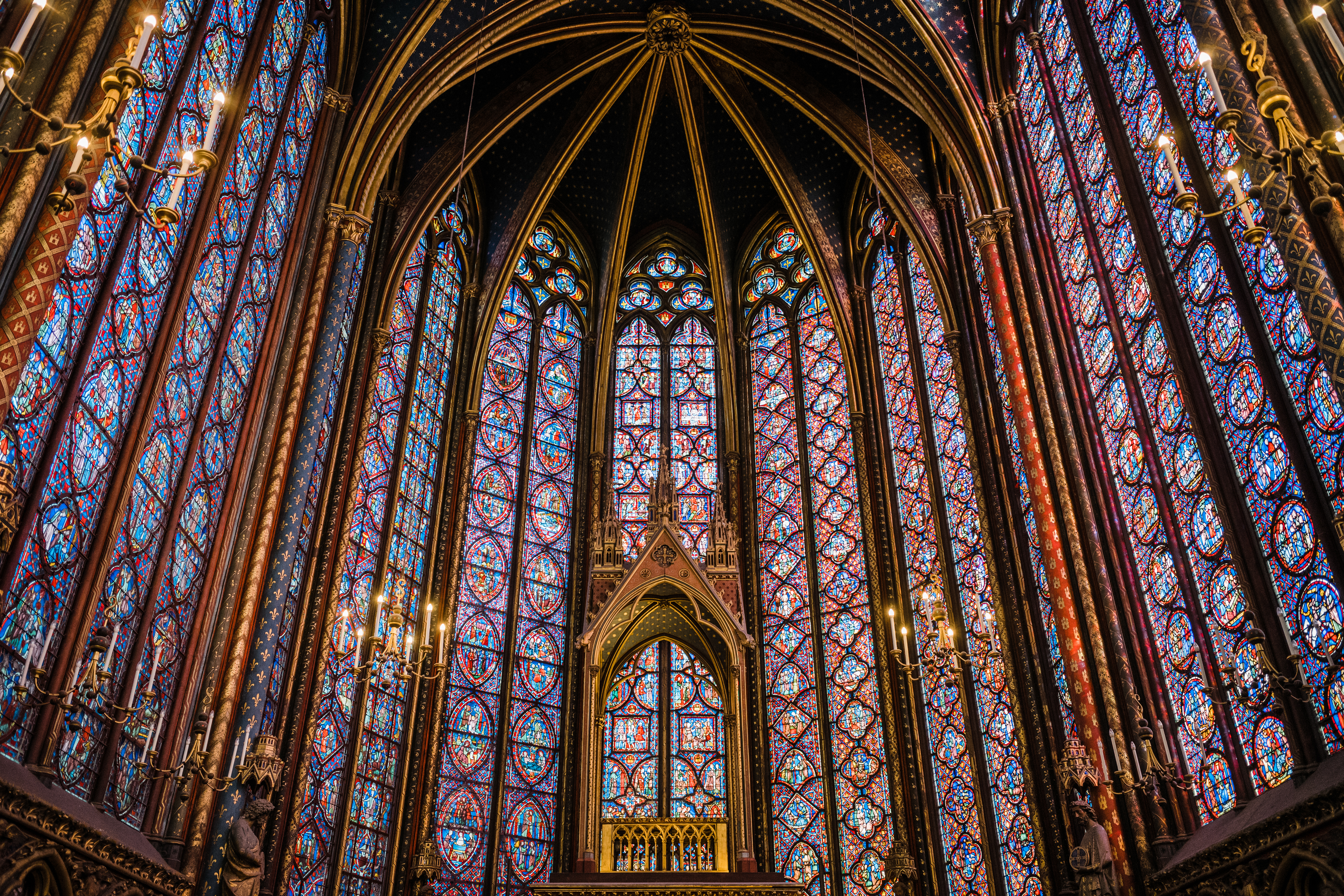
Sainte-Chapelle, Paris, by Pierre de Montreuil, 1243-1248

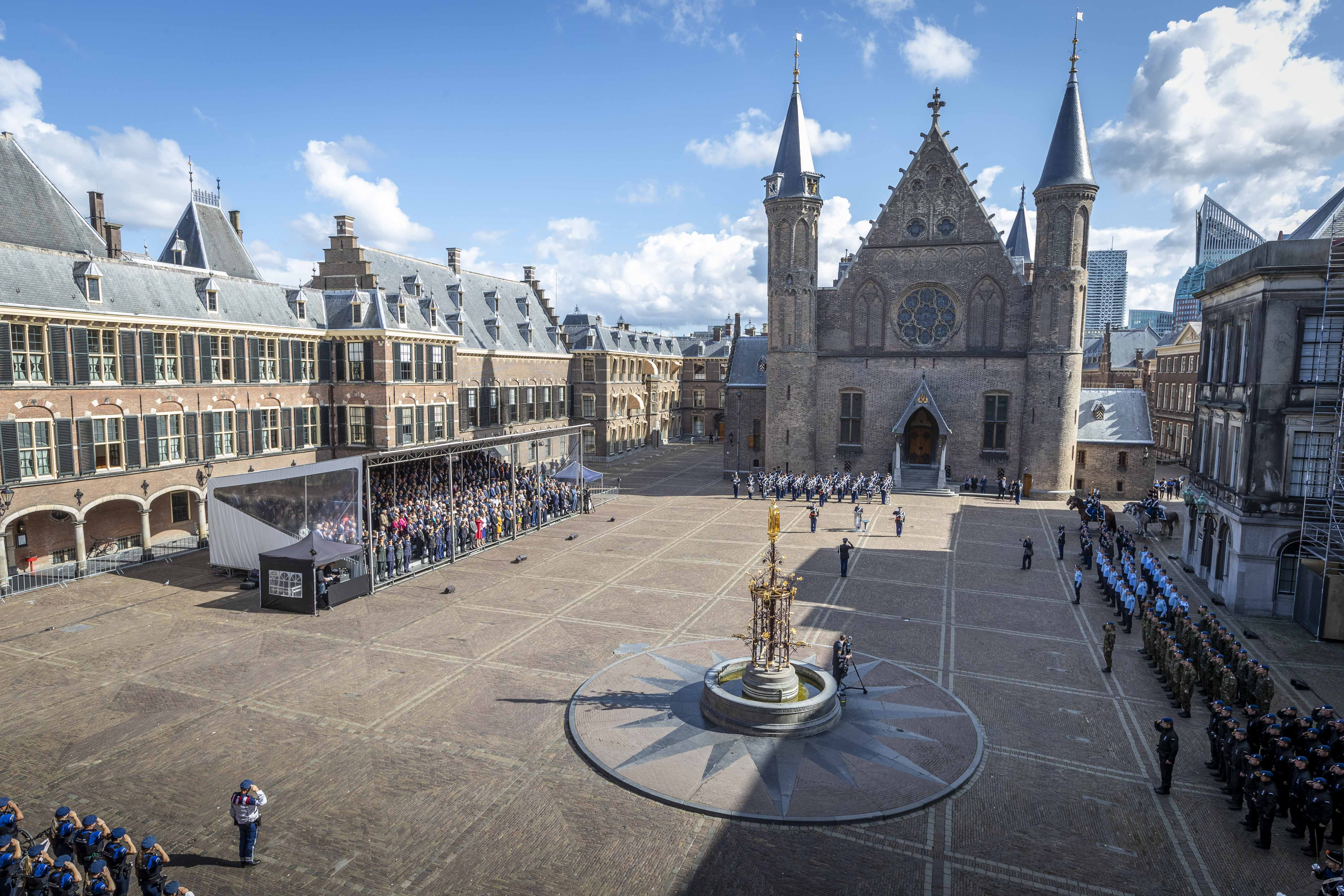
Ridderzaal, The Hague, Netherlands, unknown architect, 1288

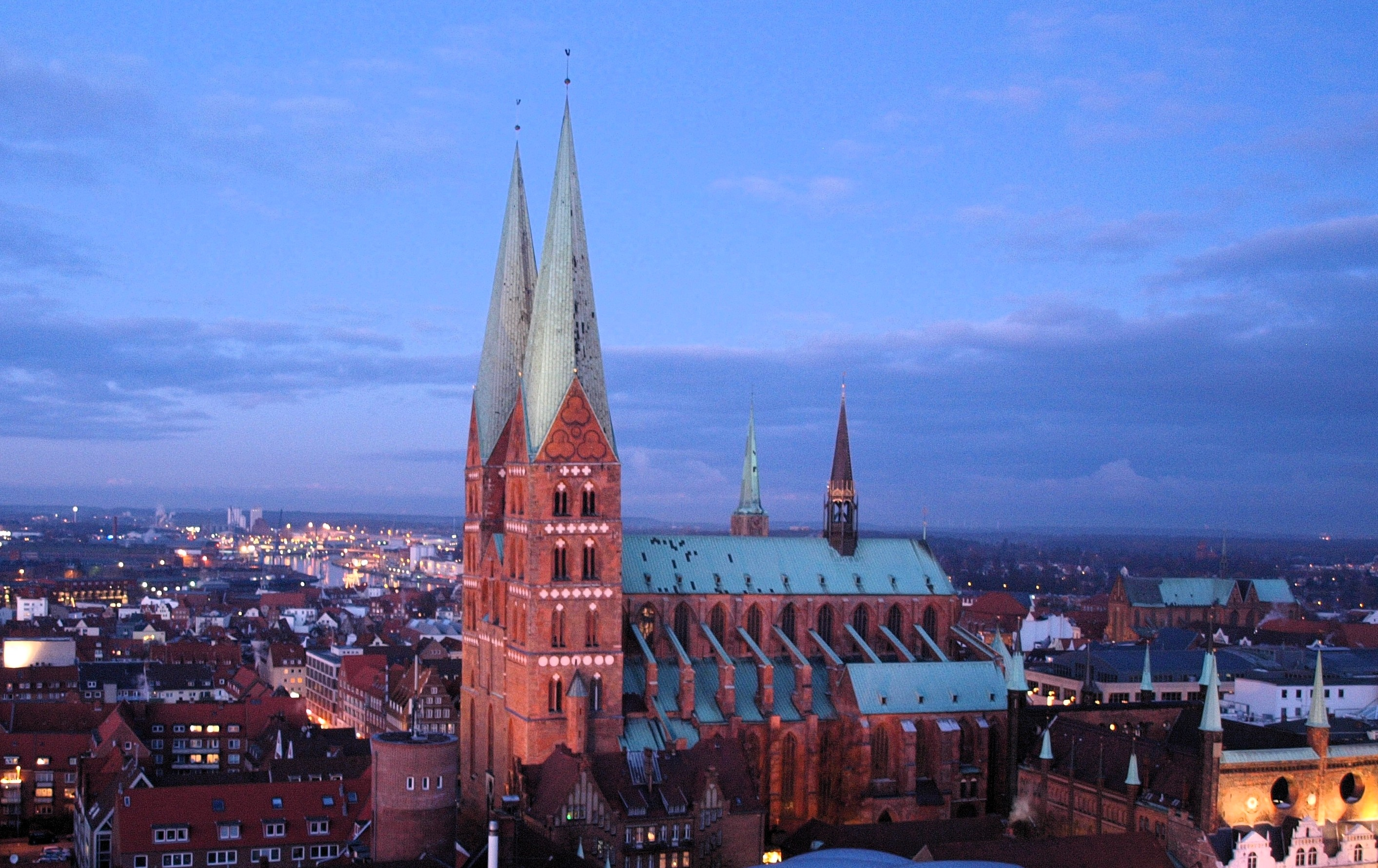
St. Mary's Church, 1265–1352, in Lübeck, unknown architect, Germany

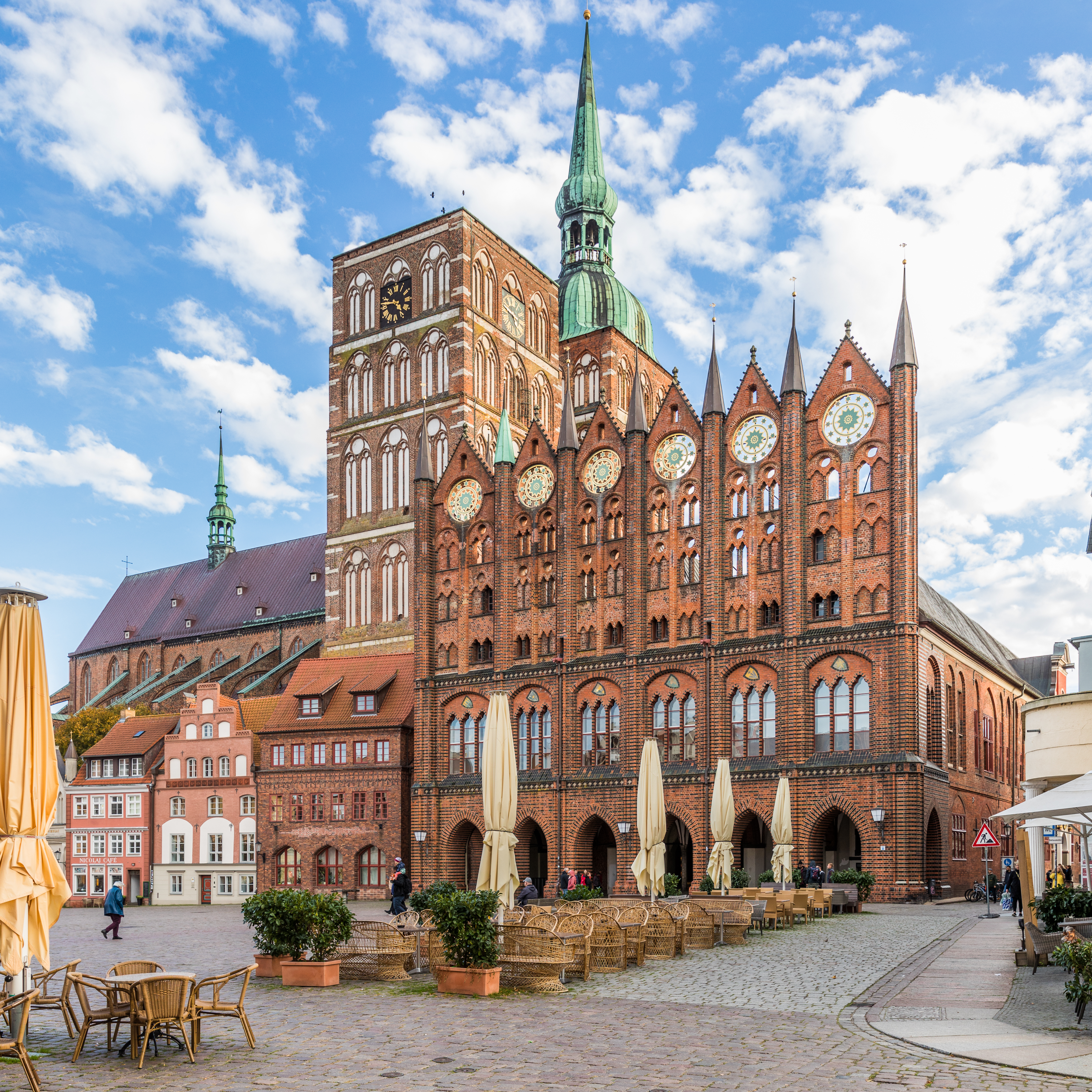
Town Hall and St. Nicholas' church in Stralsund, from around 1250 to 1400, unknown architect, Germany

Gothic architecture began with a series of experiments, which were conducted to fulfil specific requests by patrons and to accommodate the ever-growing number of pilgrims visiting sites that housed precious relics. Pilgrims in the high Middle Ages (circa 1000 to 1250 AD) increasingly travelled to well-known pilgrimage sites, but also to local sites where local and national saints were reputed to have performed miracles. The churches and monasteries housing important relics therefore wanted to heighten the popularity of their respective saints and build appropriate shrines for them. These shrines were not merely gem-encrusted reliquaries, but more importantly took the form of powerful architectural settings characterised by coloured light emitting from the large areas of stained glass. The use of stained glass, however, is not the only defining element of Gothic architecture and neither are the pointed arch, the ribbed vault, the rose window or the flying buttress, as many of these elements were used in one way or another in preceding architectural traditions. It was rather the combination and constant refinement of these elements, along with the quick response to the rapidly changing building techniques of the time, that fuelled the Gothic movement in architecture.

Consequently, it is difficult to point to one element or the exact place where Gothic first emerged; however, it is traditional to initiate a discussion of Gothic architecture with the Basilica of St Denis (circa 1135–1344) and its patrons, Abbot Suger, who began to rebuild the west front and the choir of the church. As he wrote in his De Administratione, the old building could no longer accommodate the large volumes of pilgrims who were coming to venerate the relics of St Denis, and the solution for this twofold: a west façade with three large portals and the innovative new choir, which combined an ambulatory with radiating chapels that were unique as they were not separated by walls. Instead a row of slim columns was inserted between the chapels and the choir arcade to support the rib vaults. The result enabled visitors to circulate around the altar and come within reach of the relics without actually disrupting the altar space, while also experiencing the large stained-glass windows within the chapels. As confirmed by Suger, the desire for more stained-glass was not necessarily to bring more daylight into the building but rather to fill the space with a continuous ray of colorful light, rather like mosaics or precious stones, which would make the wall vanish. The demand for ever more stained-glass windows and the search for techniques that would support them are constant throughout the development of Gothic architecture, as is evident in the writings of Suger, who was fascinated by the mystical quality of such lighting.

Brick Gothic was a specific style of Gothic architecture common in Northeast and Central Europe especially in the regions in and around the Baltic Sea, which do not have resources of standing rock. The buildings are essentially built using bricks.

=== Renaissance ===
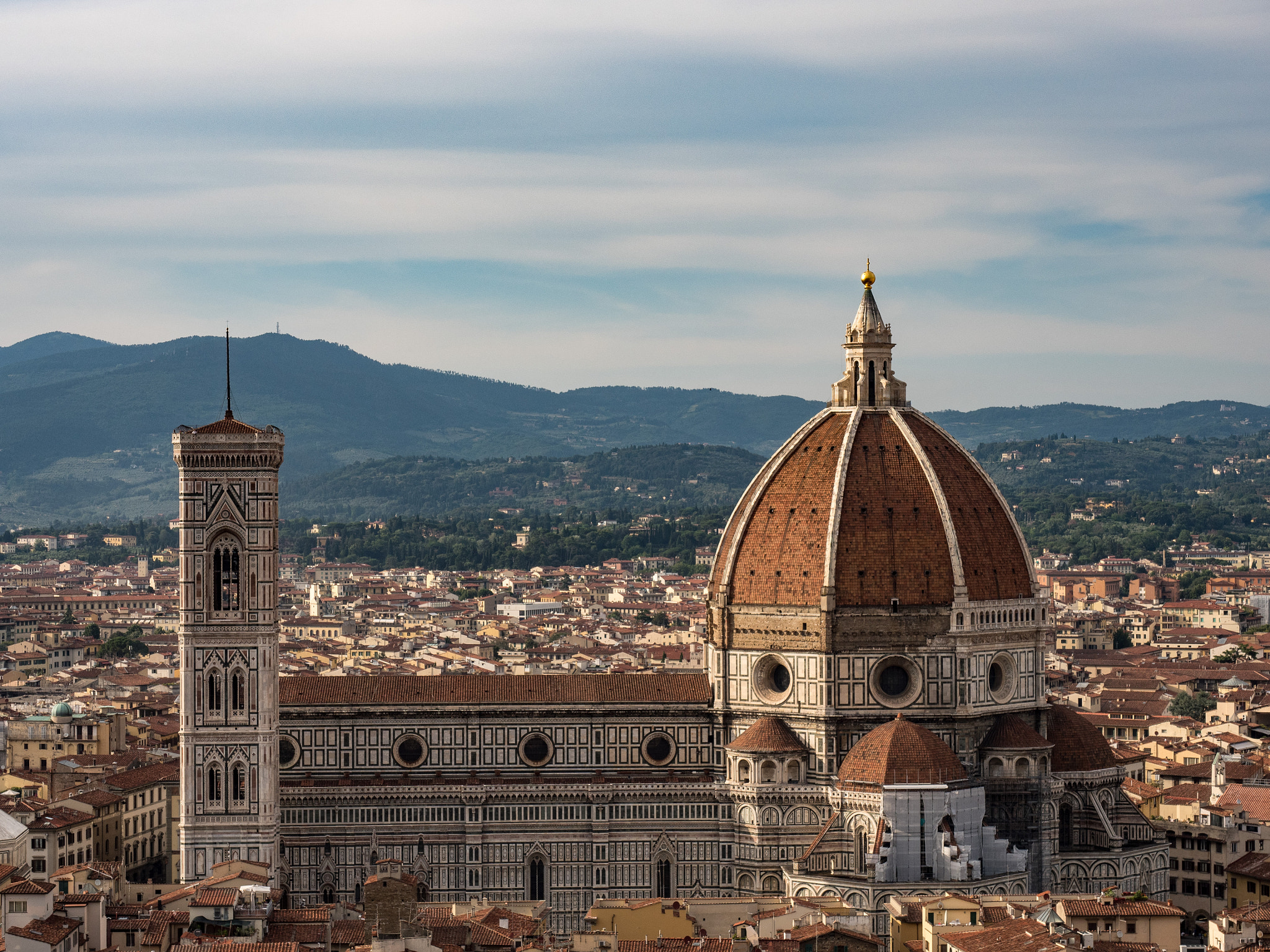
Early Renaissance – Florence Cathedral, Florence, Italy, by Arnolfo di Cambio, Filippo Brunelleschi and Emilio De Fabris, 1294–1436

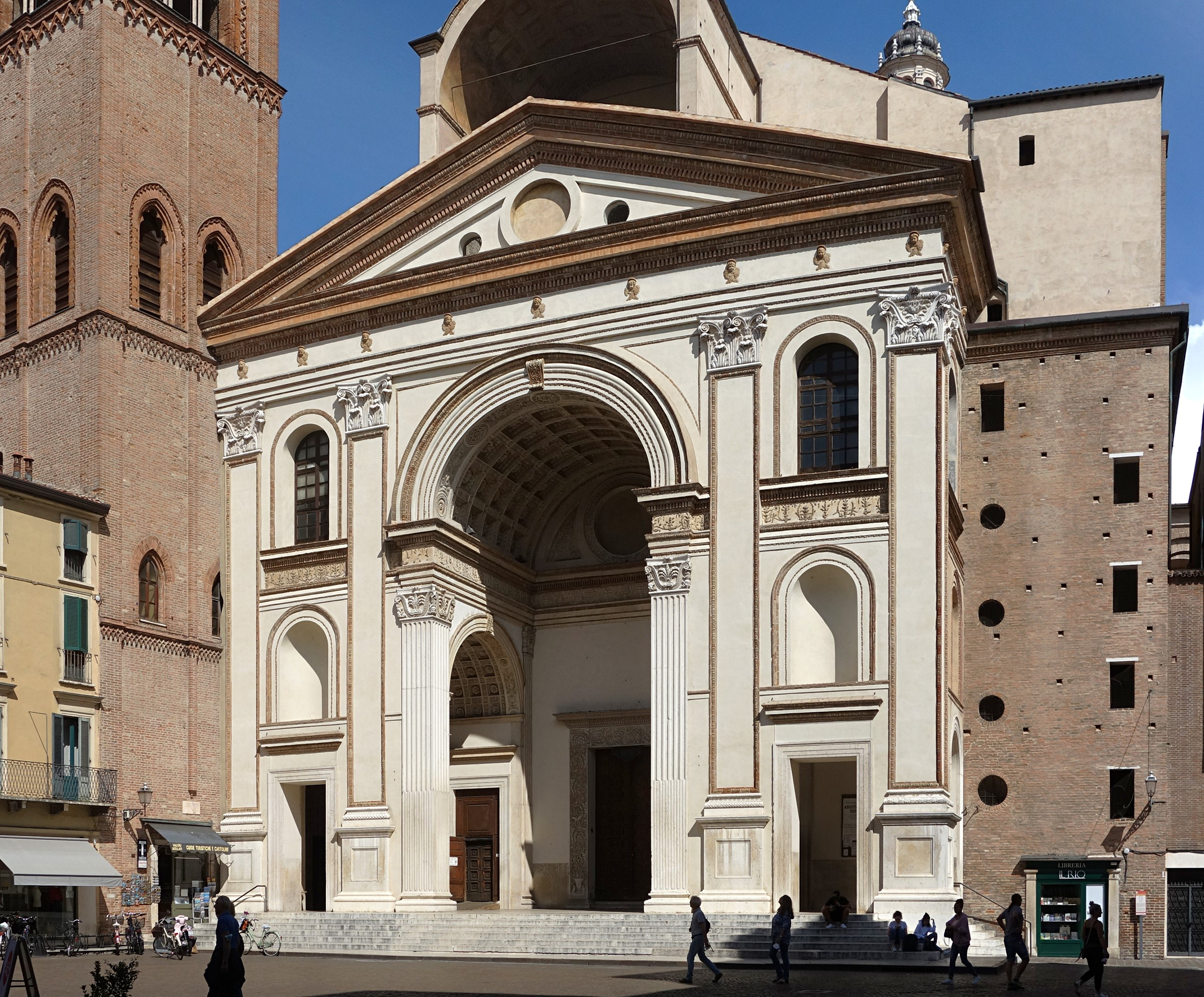
Early Renaissance - Basilica of Sant'Andrea, Mantua, Italy, by Leon Battista Alberti, begun in 1470

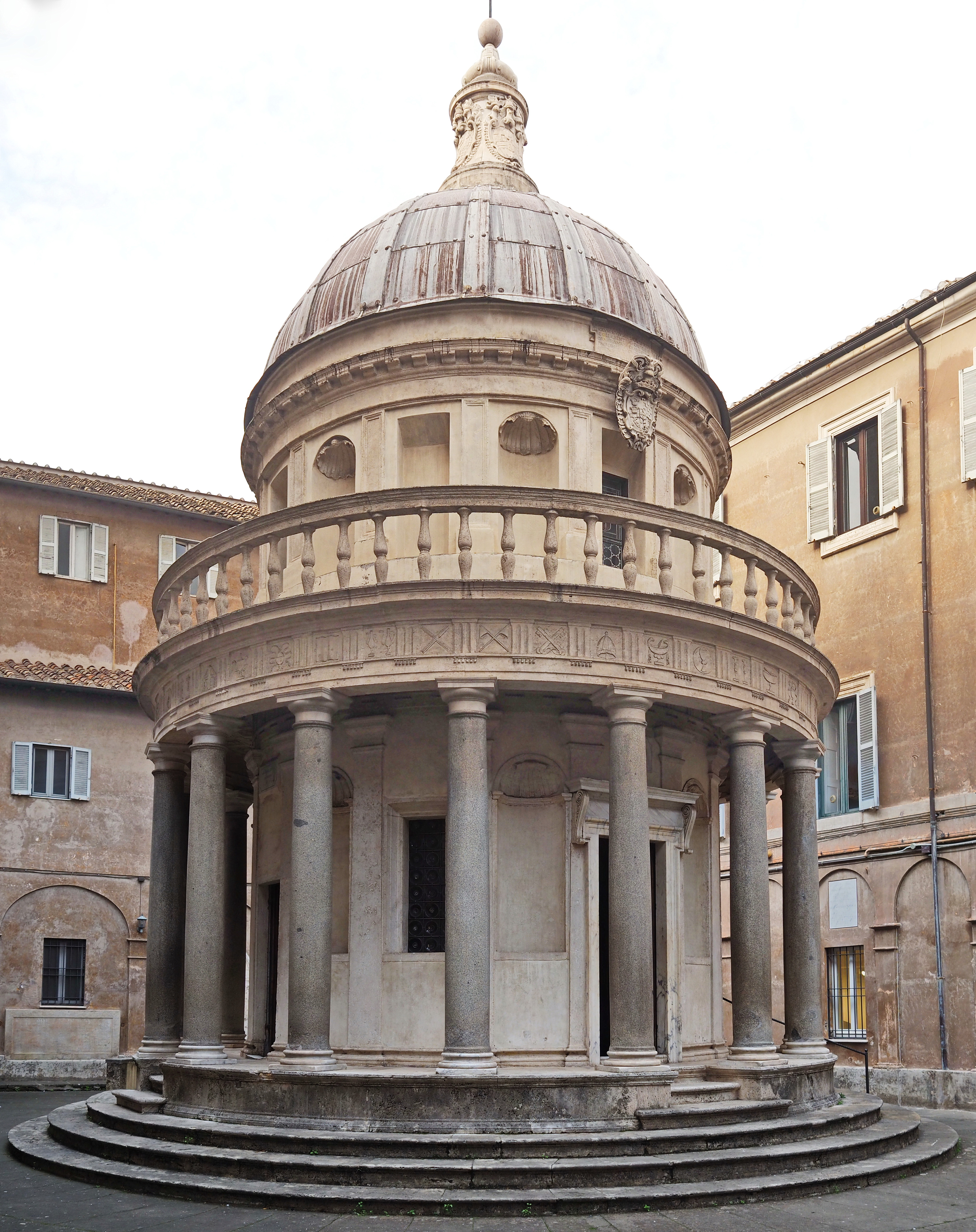
High Renaissance - The Tempietto, San Pietro in Montorio, Rome, by Donato Bramante, 1502

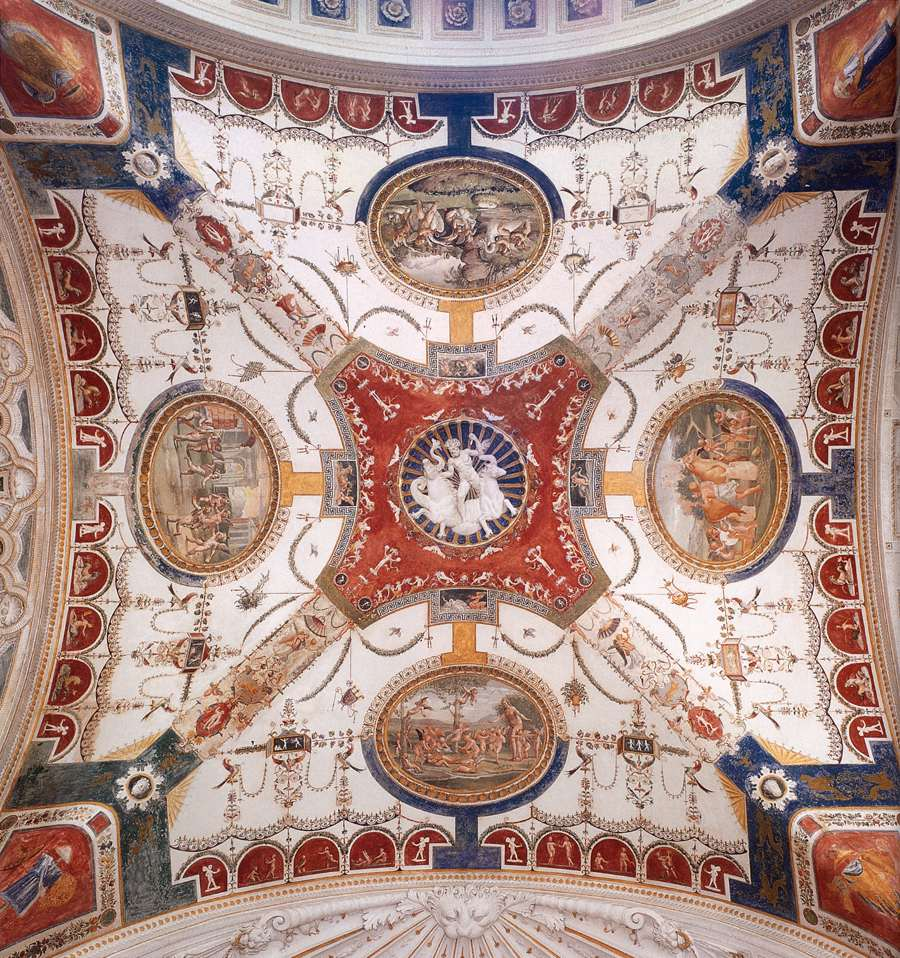
High Renaissance – Villa Madama, outside Rome, begun by Raphael, 1518–1525

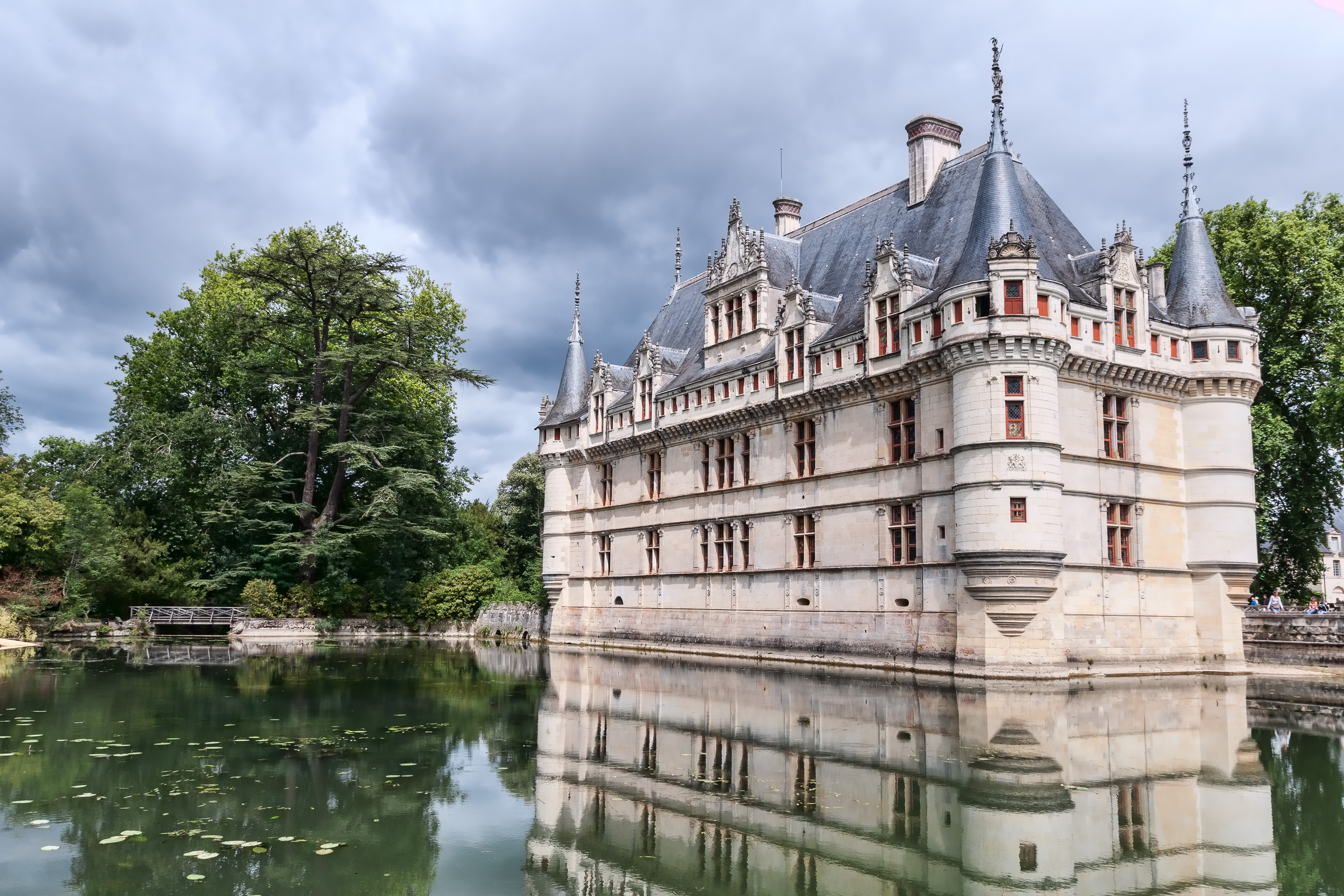
Northern Renaissance - Château d'Azay-le-Rideau, Loire, France, unknown architect, 1518–1527

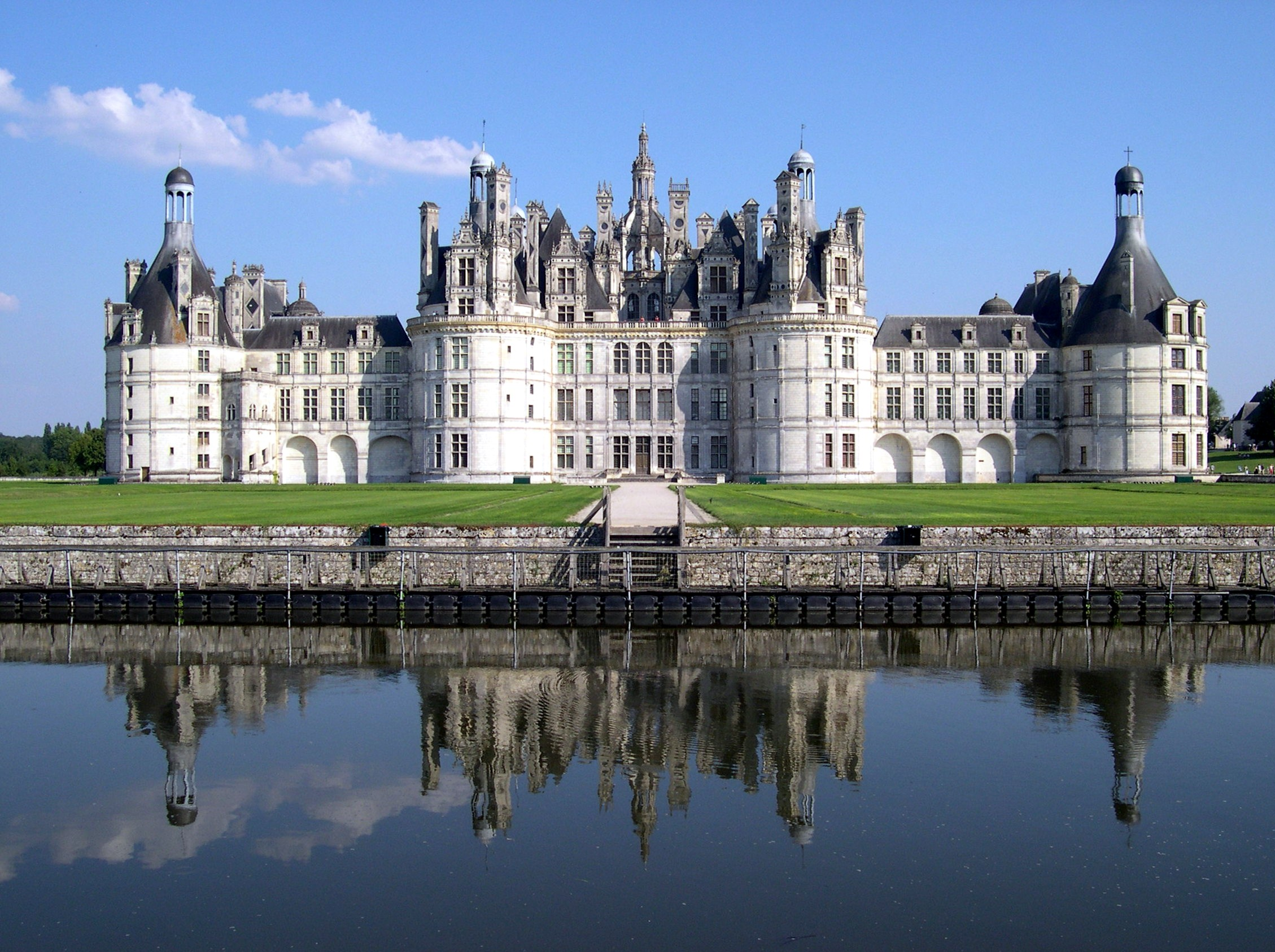
Northern Renaissance - Château de Chambord, Loire, France, by Domenico da Cortona, 1519–1547

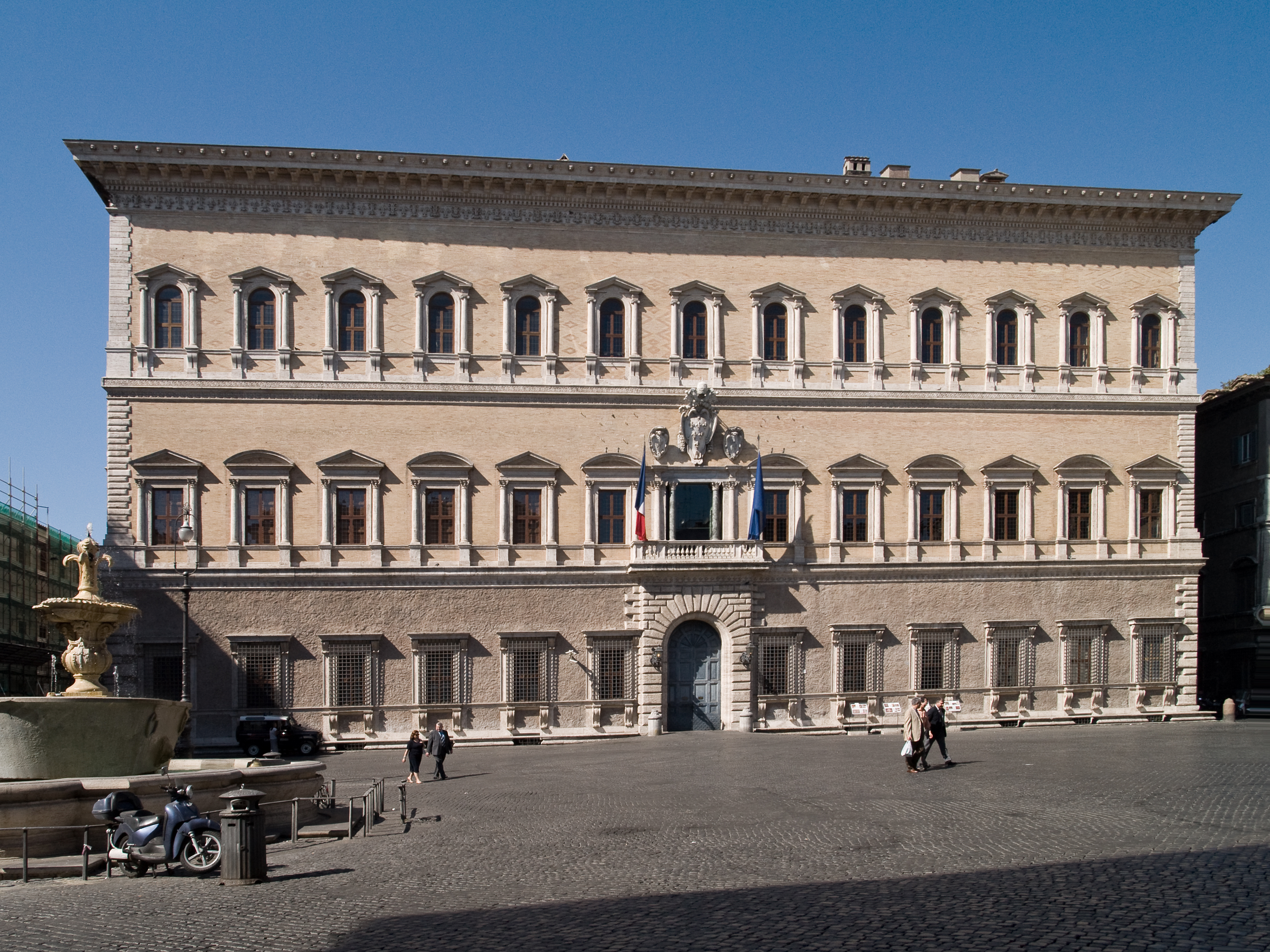
High Renaissance – Palazzo Farnese, Rome, by Antonio da Sangallo the Younger, 1534–1546

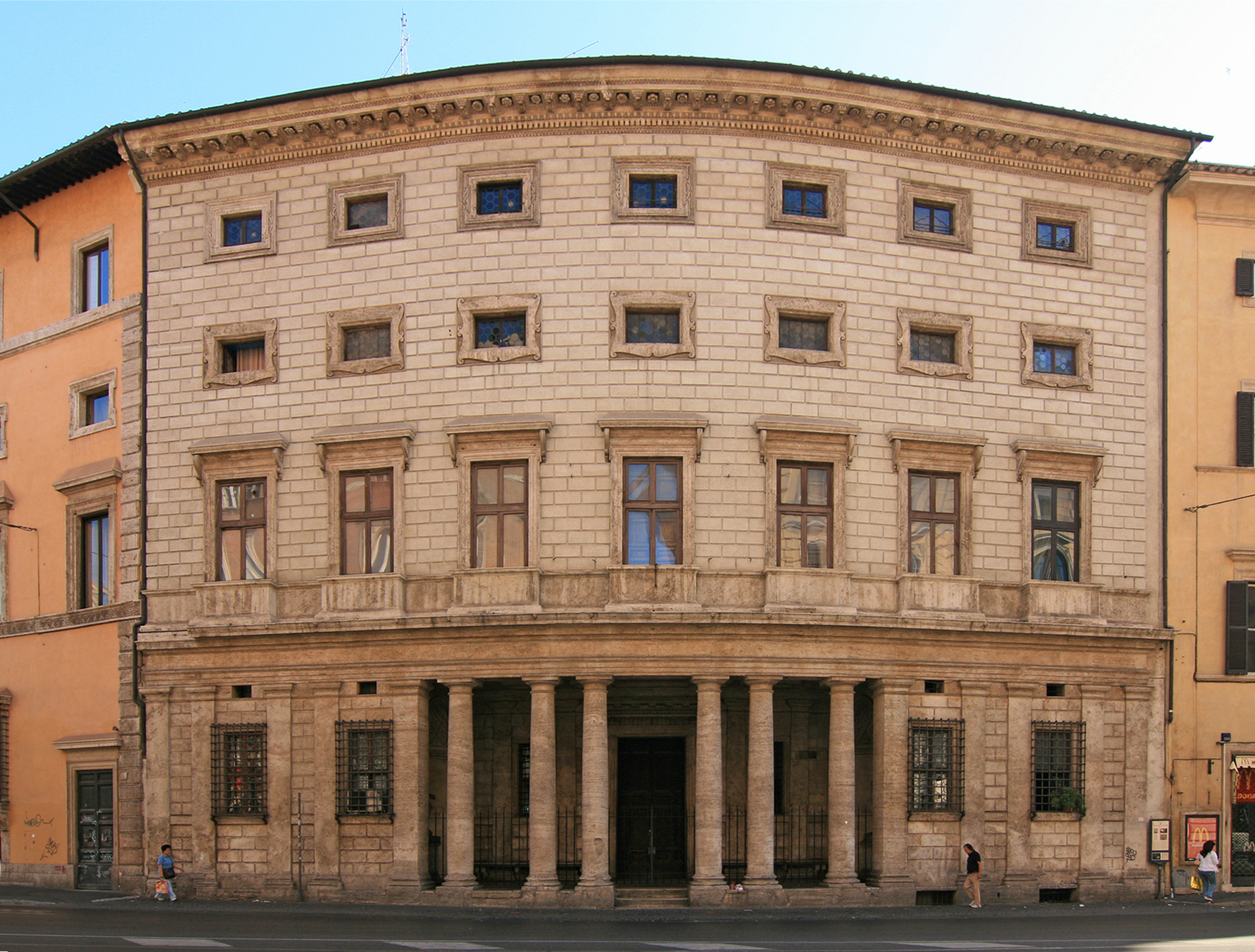
Mannerism – Palazzo Massimo alle Colonne, Rome, by Baldassare Peruzzi, begun 1535

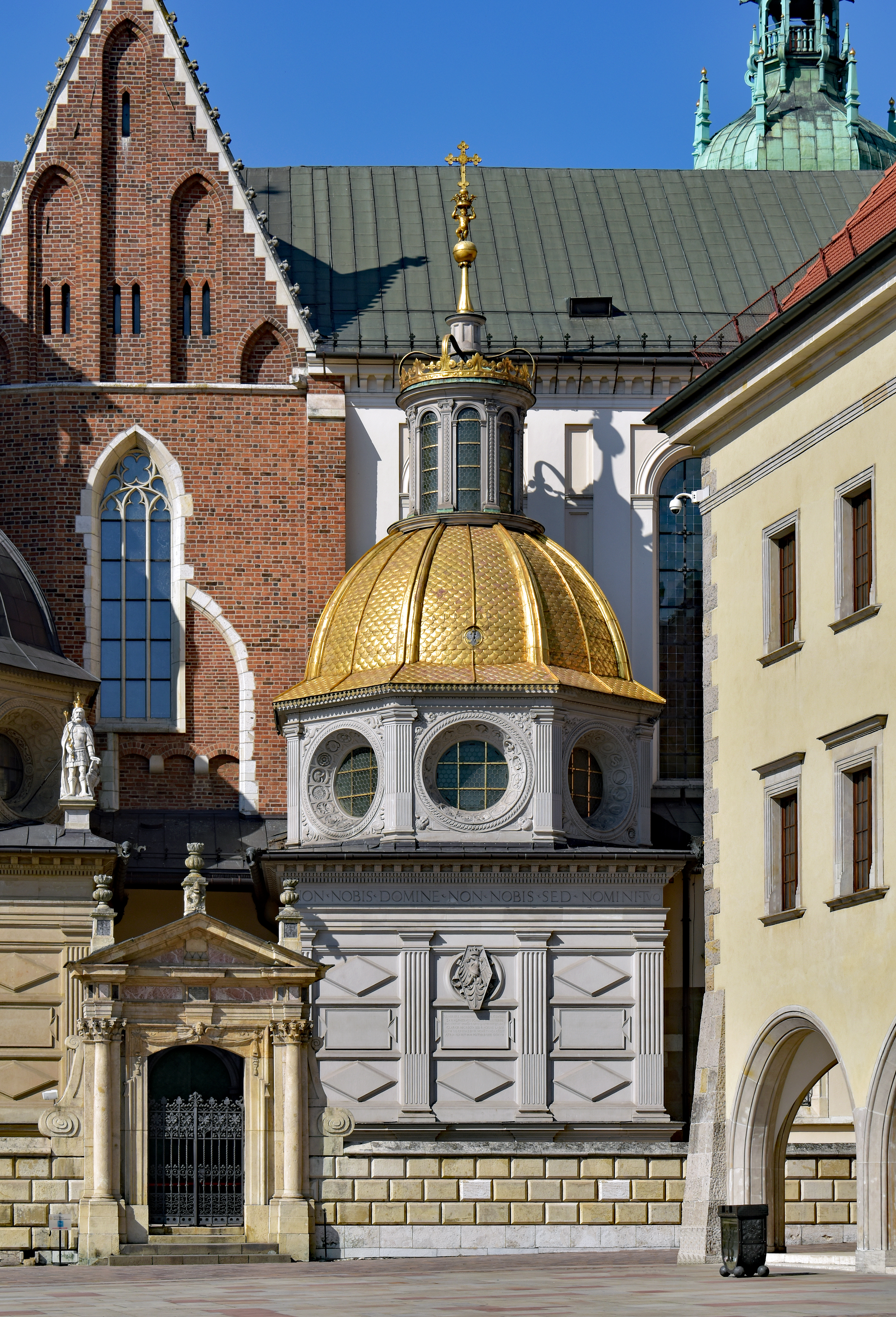
High Renaissance – Sigismund's Chapel, Kraków, Poland, by Bartolommeo Berrecci, 1519–1533

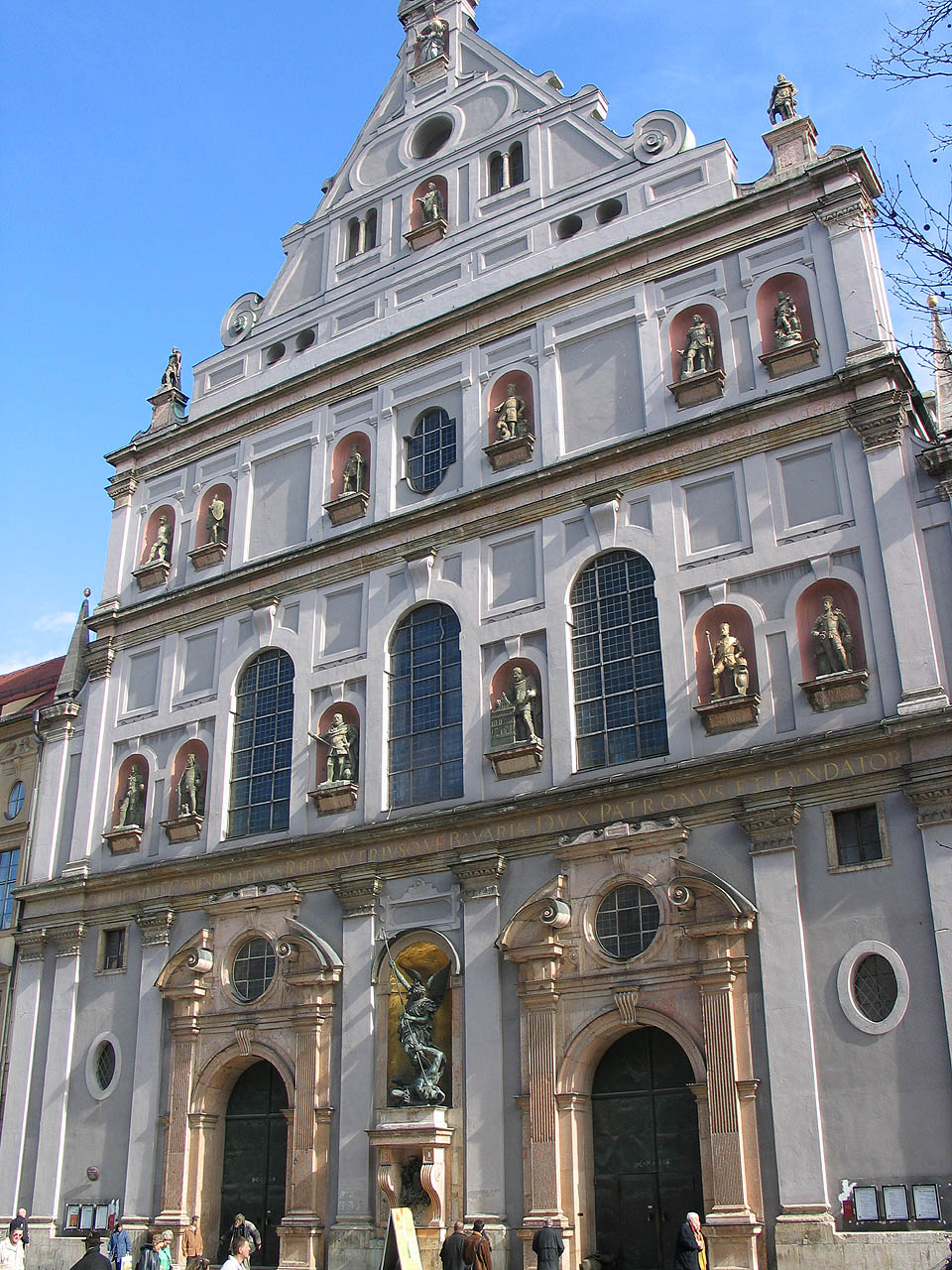
Mannerism - St. Michael's Church, Munich, Germany, by Wendel Dietrich and Friedrich Sustris, 1583–1597

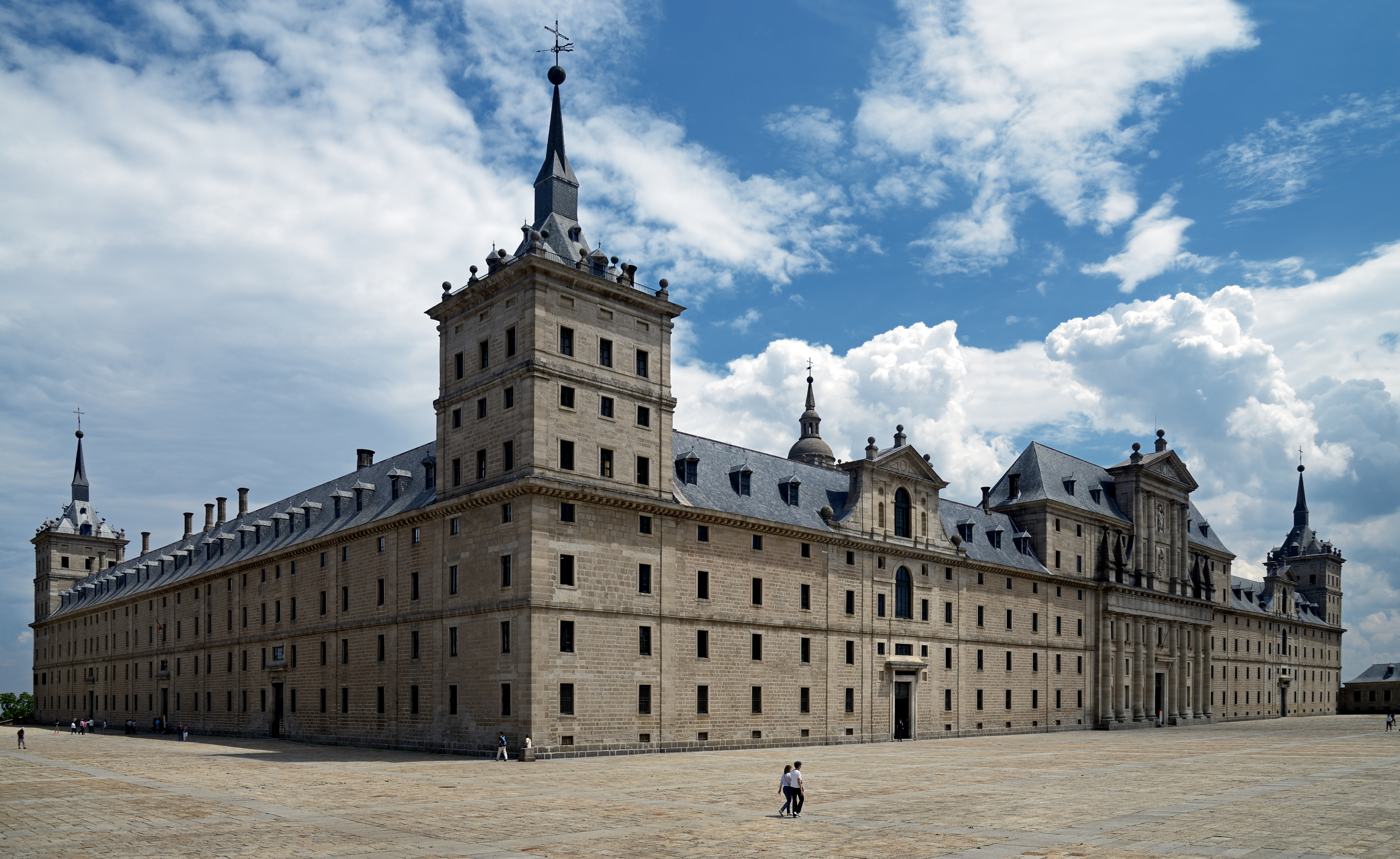
Mannerism - El Escorial, outside Madrid, Spain, by Juan Bautista de Toledo and Juan de Herrera, 1559-1584

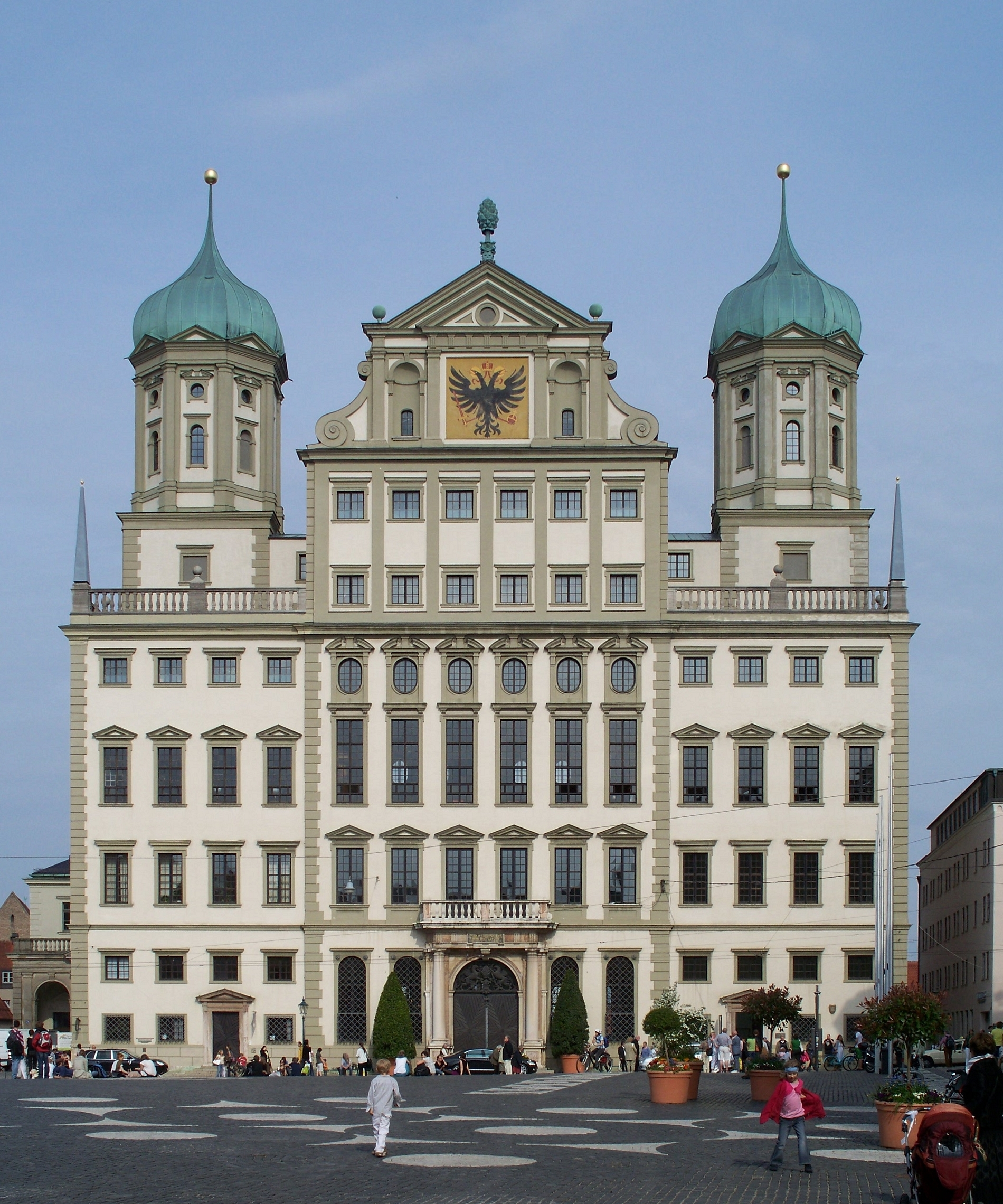
Mannerism – Augsburg Town Hall, Augsburg, by Elias Holl, 1615–1624

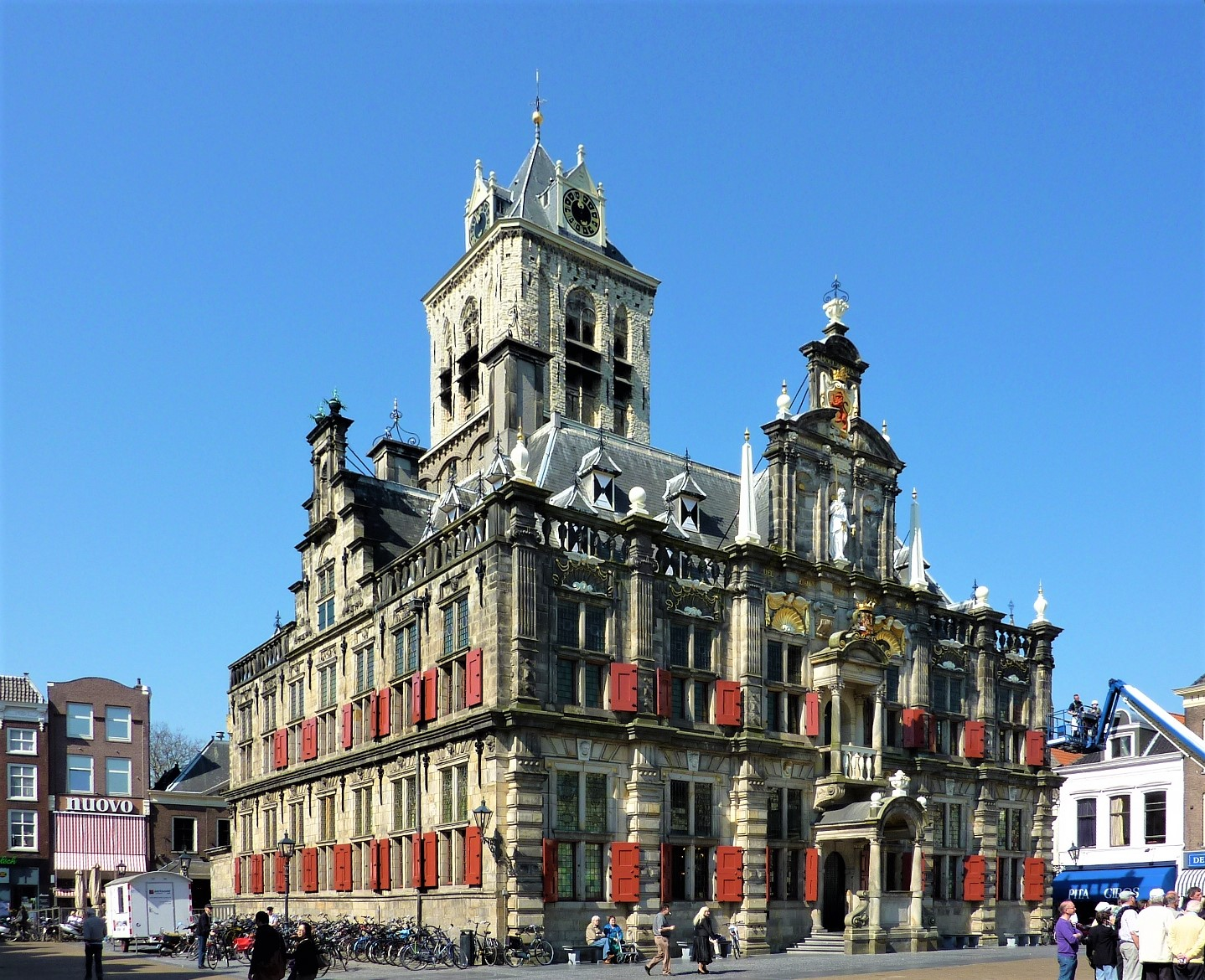
Mannerism – City Hall, Delft, The Netherlands, by Hendrick de Keyser, 1618–1620

During the Renaissance, Italy consisted of many states, and intense rivalry between them generated an increase in technical and artistic developments. The Medici family, an Italian banking family and political dynasty, is famous for its financial support of Renaissance art and architecture.

The period began in around 1452, when the architect and humanist Leon Battista Alberti (1404–1472) completed his treatise De Re Aedificatoria (On the Art of Building) after studying the ancient ruins of Rome and Vitruvius's De Architectura. His writings covered numerous subjects, including history, town planning, engineering, sacred geometry, humanism and philosophies of beauty, and set out the key elements of architecture and its ideal proportions. In the last decades of the 15th century, artists and architects began to visit Rome to study the ruins, especially the Colosseum and the Pantheon. They left behind precious records of their studies in the form of drawings. While humanist interest in Rome had been building up over more than a century (dating back at least to Petrarch in the 14th century), antiquarian considerations of monuments had focused on literary, epigraphic and historical information rather than on the physical remains. Although some artists and architects, such as Filippo Brunelleschi (1377–1446), Donatello (circa 1386–1466) and Leon Battista Alberti, are reported to have made studies of Roman sculpture and ruins, almost no direct evidence of this work survives. By the 1480s, prominent architects, such as Francesco di Giorgio (1439–1502) and Giuliano da Sangallo (circa 1445–1516), were making numerous studies of ancient monuments, undertaken in ways that demonstrated that the process of transforming the model into a new design had already begun. In many cases, drawing ruins in their fragmentary state necessitated a leap of imagination, as Francesco himself readily admitted in his annotation to his reconstruction of the Campidoglio, noting 'largely imagined by me, since very little can be understood from the ruins.

Soon, grand buildings were constructed in Florence using the new style, like the Pazzi Chapel (1441–1478) or the Palazzo Pitti (1458–1464). The Renaissance begun in Italy, but slowly spread to other parts of Europe, with varying interpretations.

Since Renaissance art is an attempt of reviving Ancient Rome's culture, it uses pretty much the same ornaments as the Ancient Greek and Roman. However, because most if not all resources that Renaissance artists had were Roman, Renaissance architecture and applied arts widely use certain motifs and ornaments that are specific to Ancient Rome. The most iconic one is the margent, a vertical arrangement of flowers, leaves or hanging vines, used at pilasters. Another ornament associated with the Renaissance is the round medallion, containing a profile of a person, similar to Ancient cameos. Renaissance, Baroque, Rococo, and other post-medieval styles use putti (chubby baby angels) much more often compared to Greco-Roman art and architecture. An ornament reintroduced during the Renaissance, that was of Ancient Roman descent, that will also be used in later styles, is the cartouche, an oval or oblong design with a slightly convex surface, typically edged with ornamental scrollwork.

== Worldwide ==
=== Baroque ===
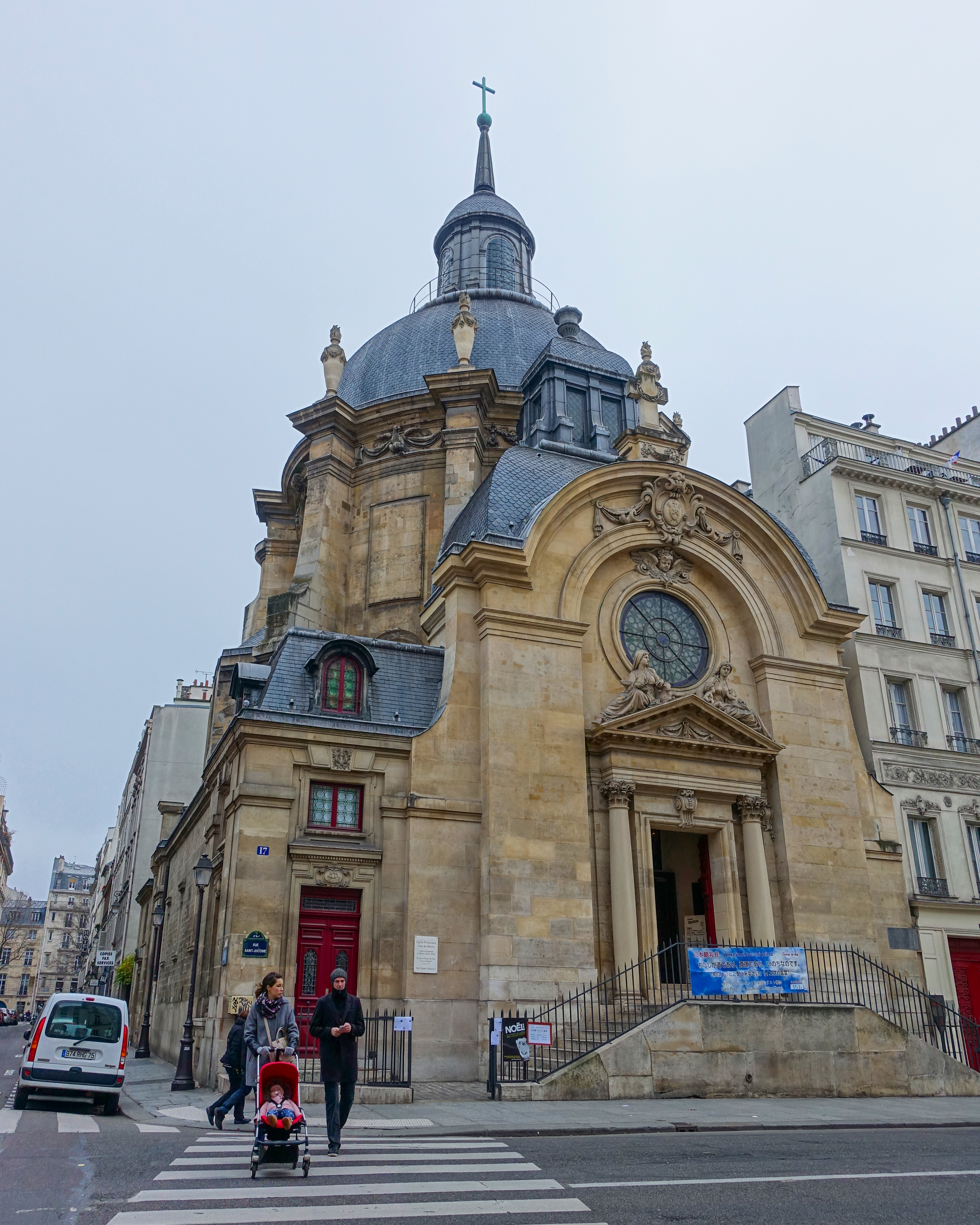
Temple du Marais, Paris, by François Mansart, c. 1632

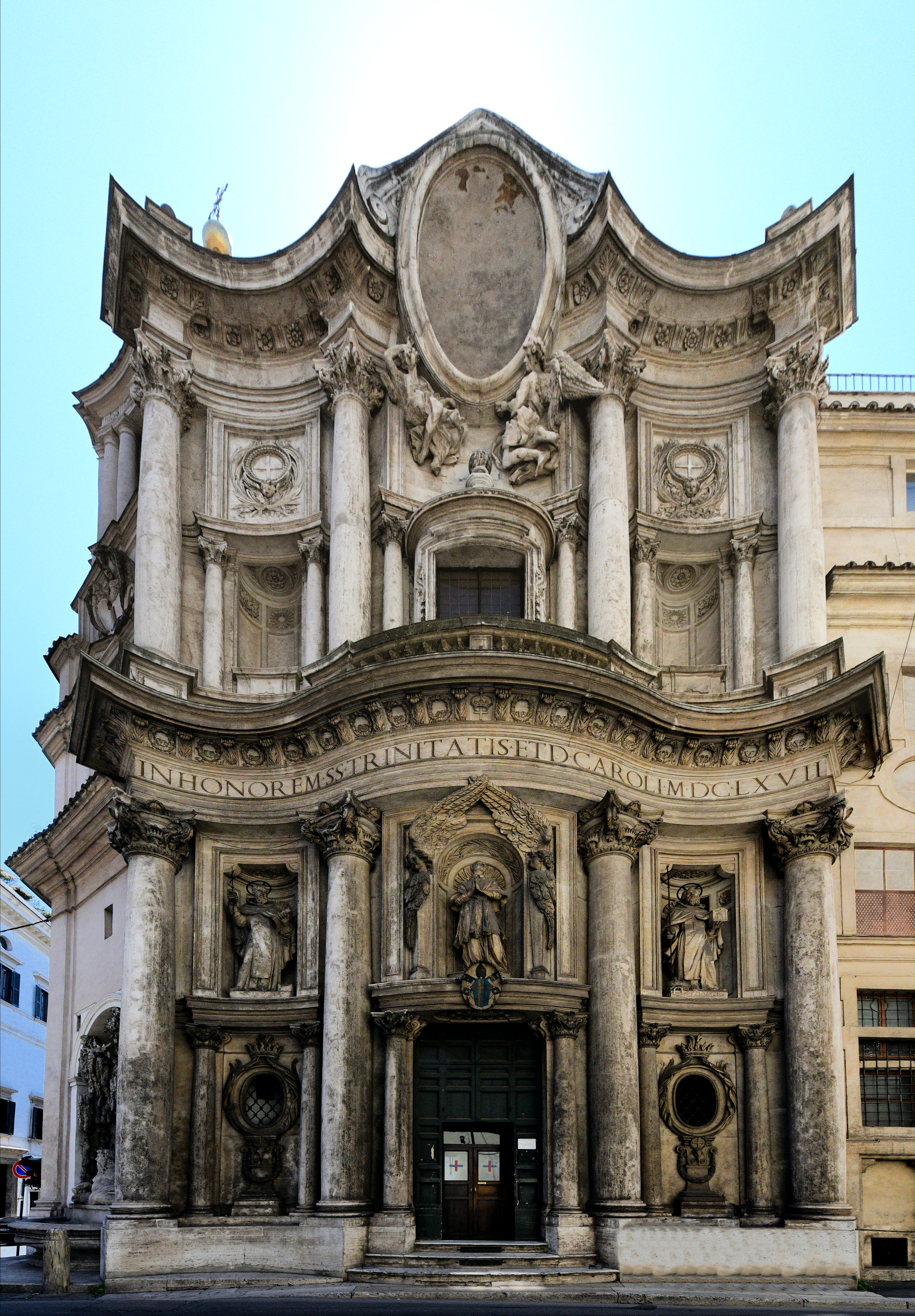
San Carlo alle Quattro Fontane, Rome, by Francesco Borromini, 1638-1677

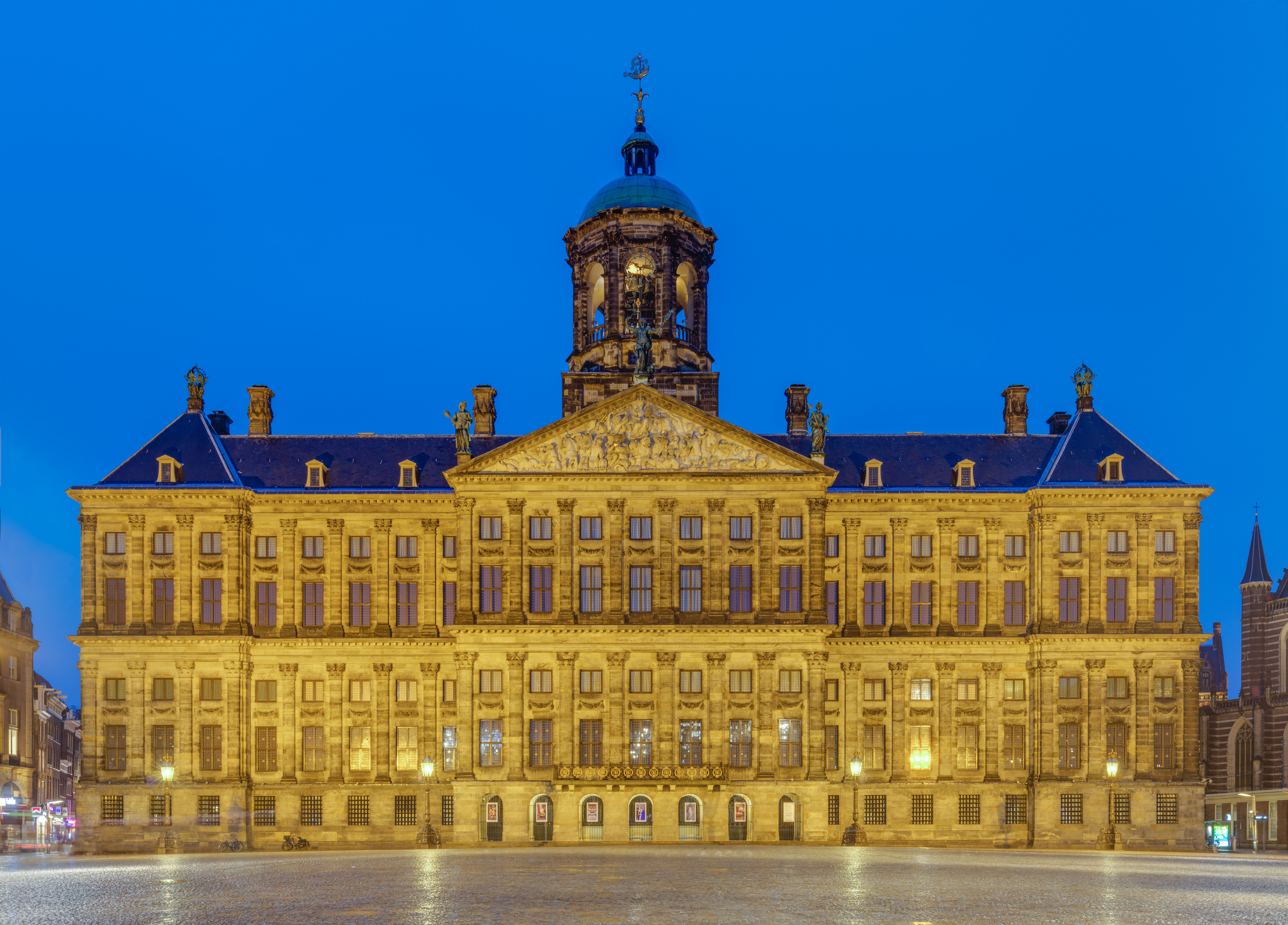
Royal Palace of Amsterdam, Amsterdam, The Netherlands, by Jacob van Campen, 1648–1665

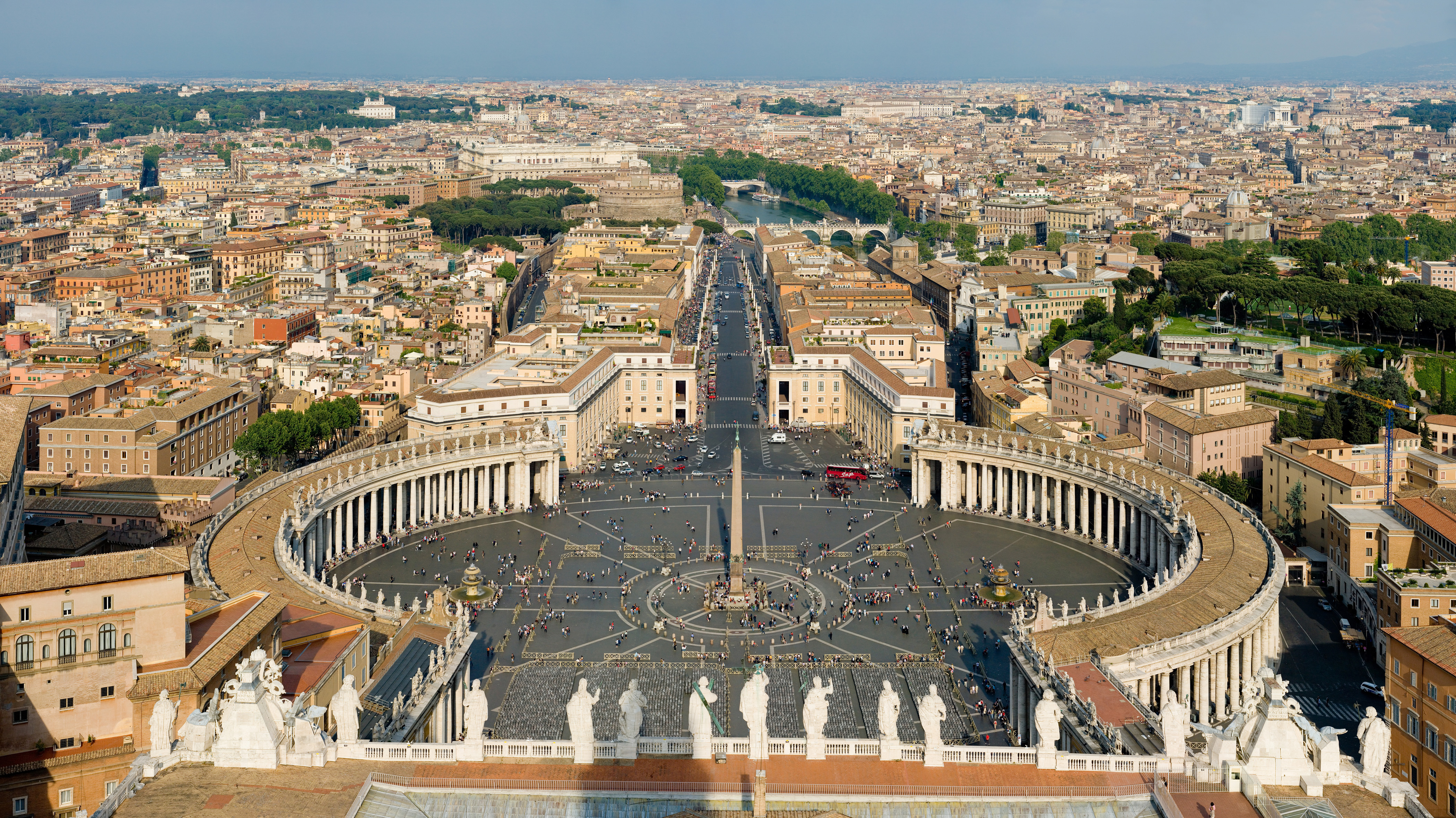
St. Peter's Square, Rome, by Gian Lorenzo Bernini, 1656-1667

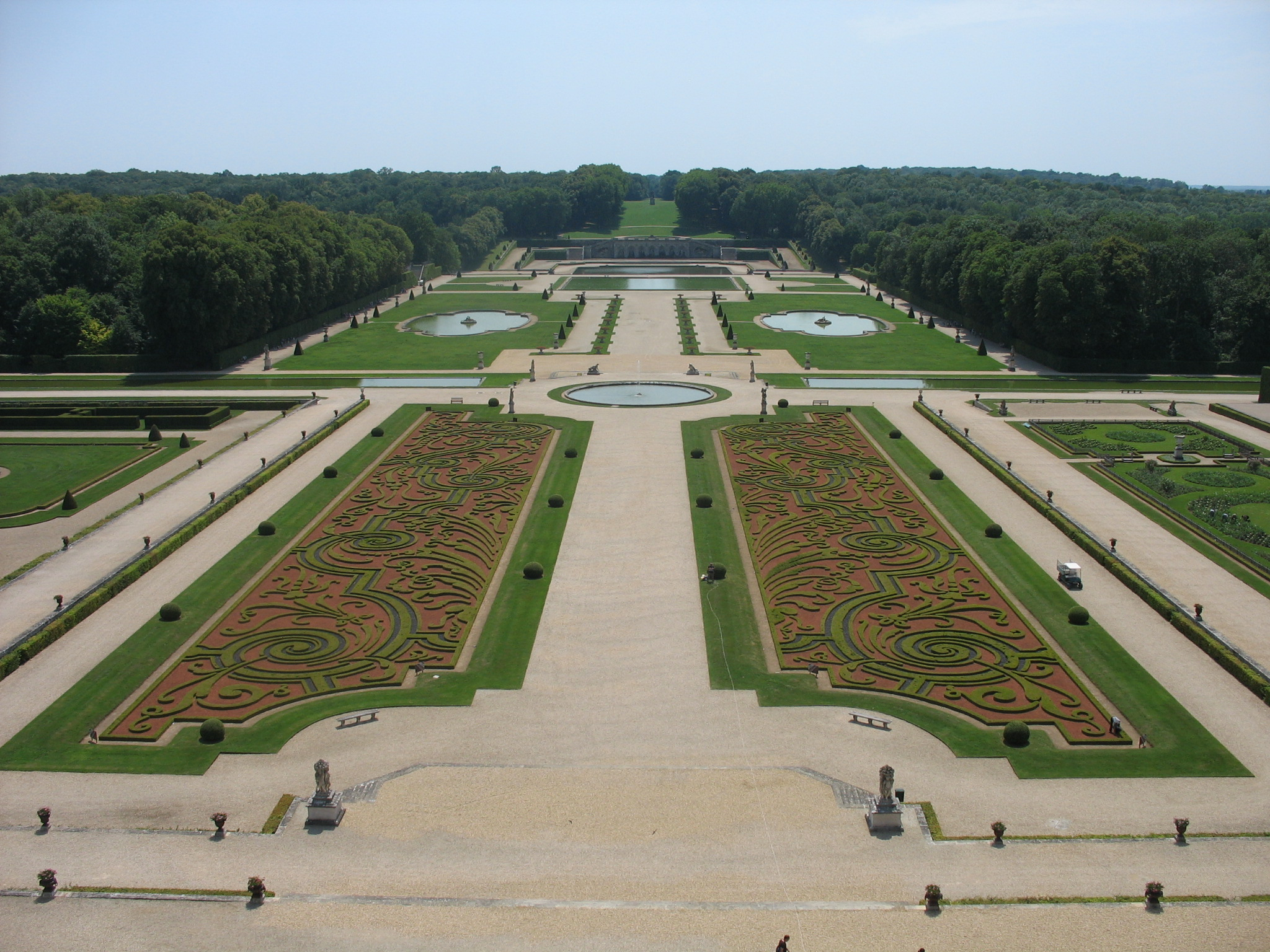
Gardens at Vaux-le-Vicomte, France, by André Le Nôtre, 1657-1661

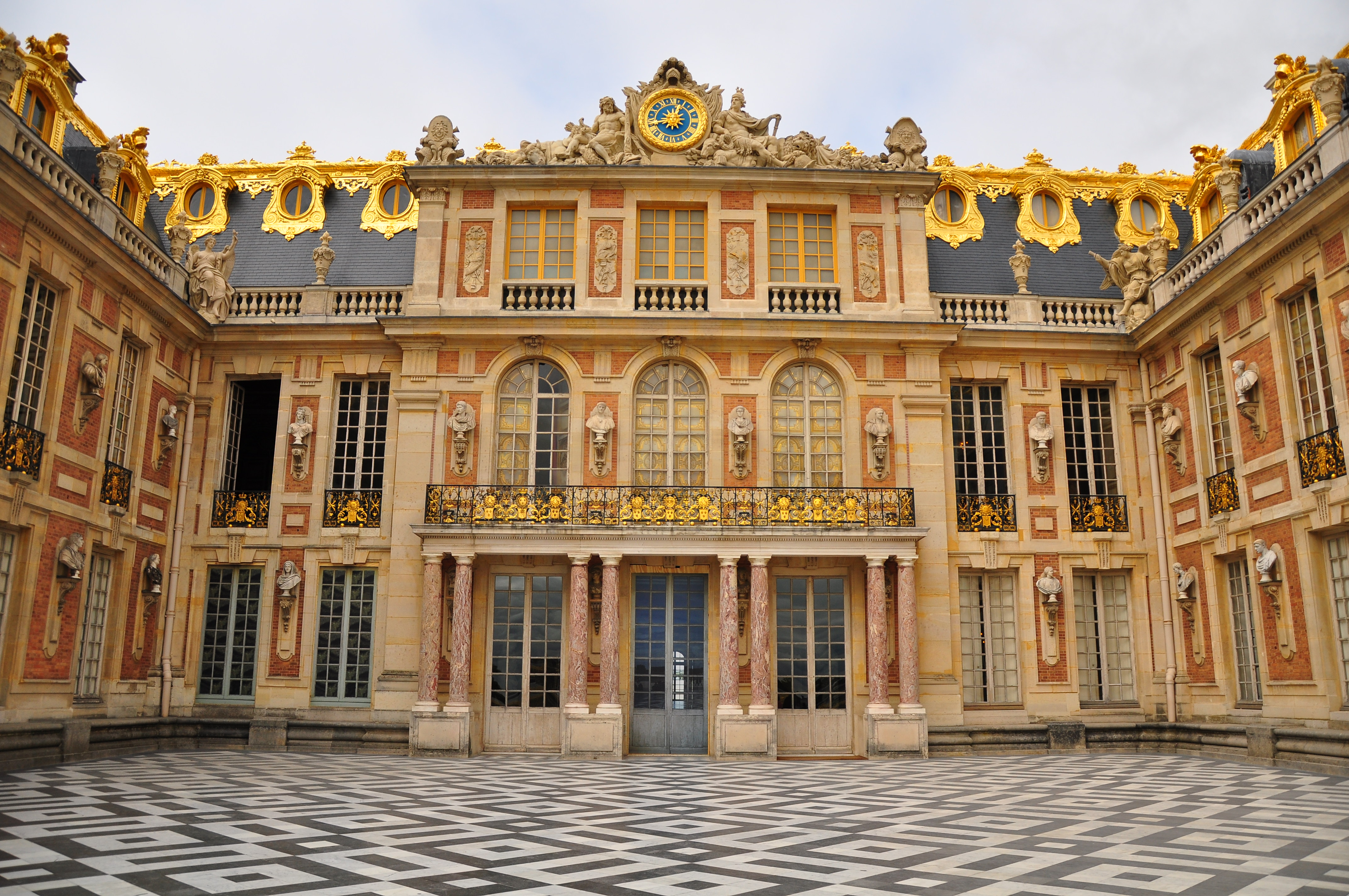
Marble Court of the Palace of Versailles, Versailles, France, by Louis Le Vau and Jules Hardouin-Mansart, c. 1660 - 1715

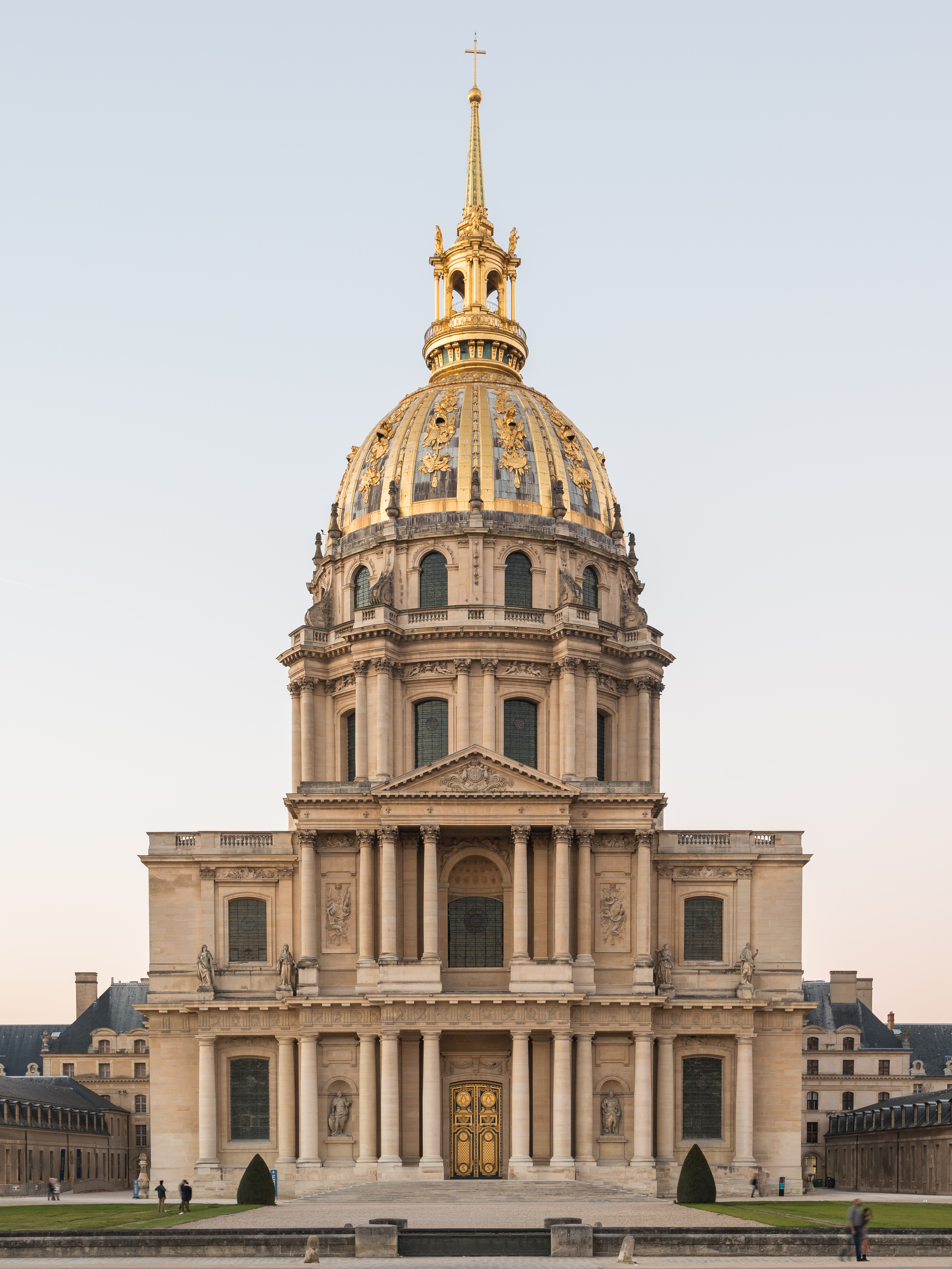
Dôme des Invalides, Paris, by Jules Hardouin-Mansart, 1677-1706

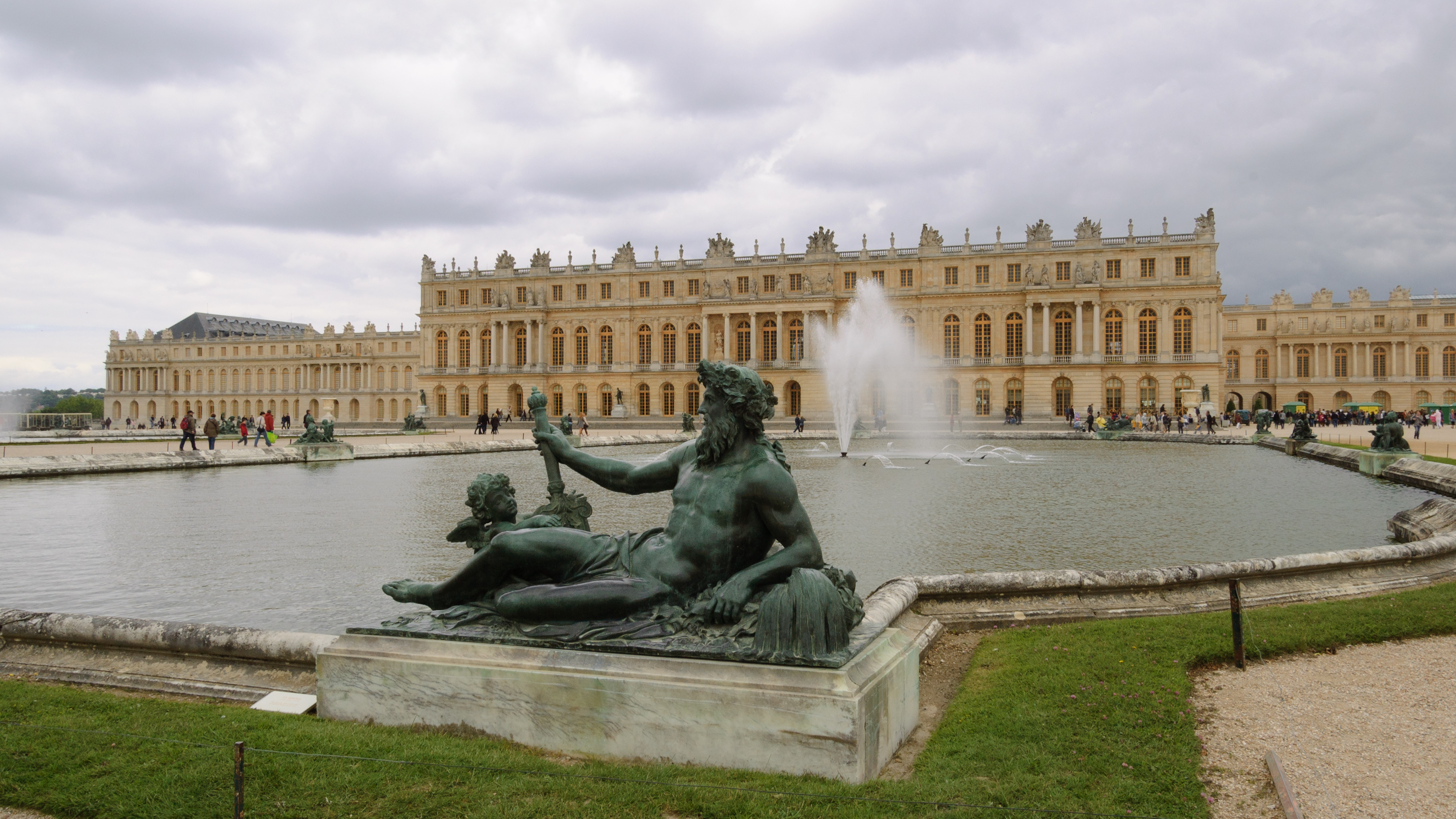
Garden façade of the Palace of Versailles, by Jules Hardouin-Mansart, 1678–1688

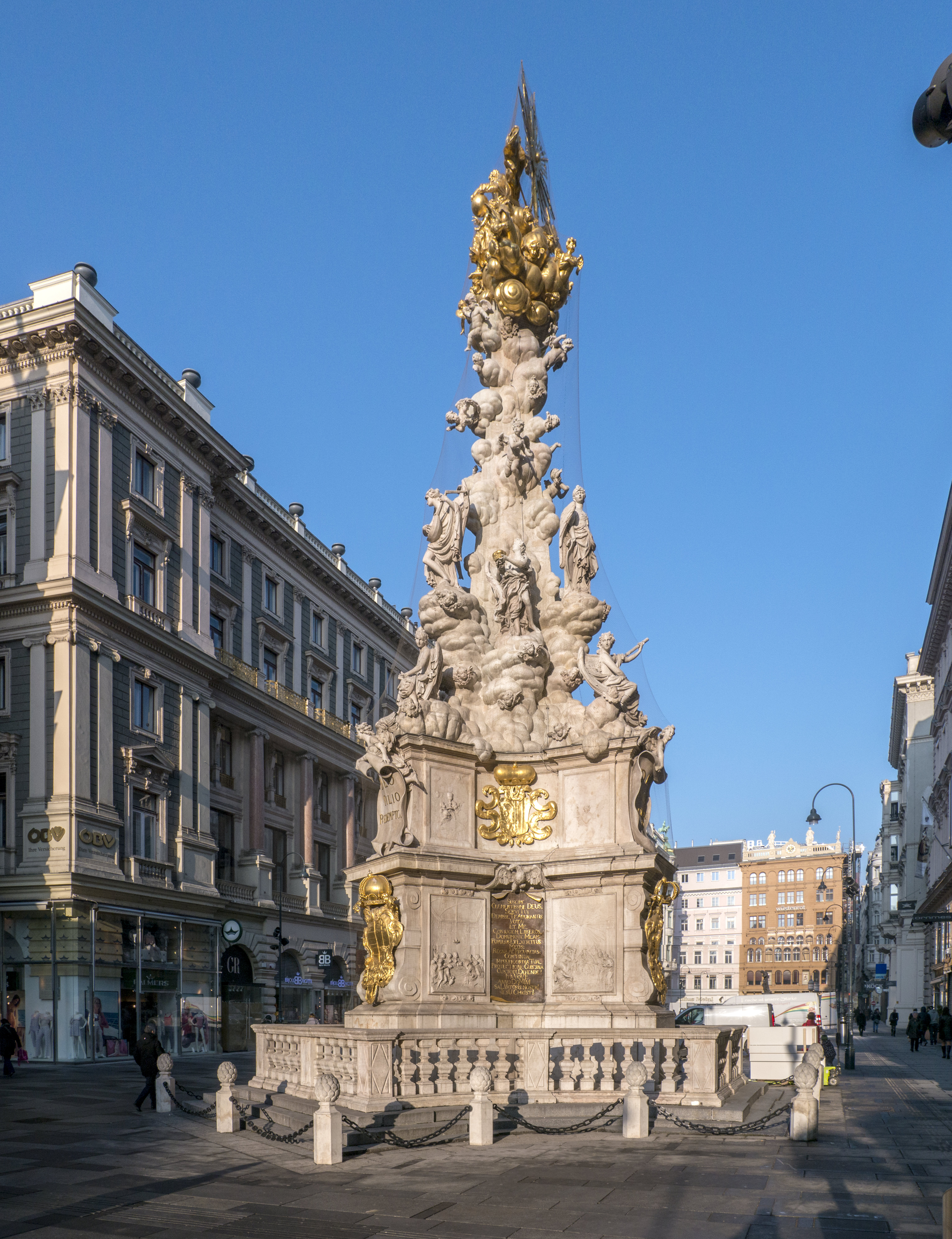
Plague Column, Vienna, by Matthias Rauchmiller and Johann Bernhard Fischer von Erlach, 1682 and 1694

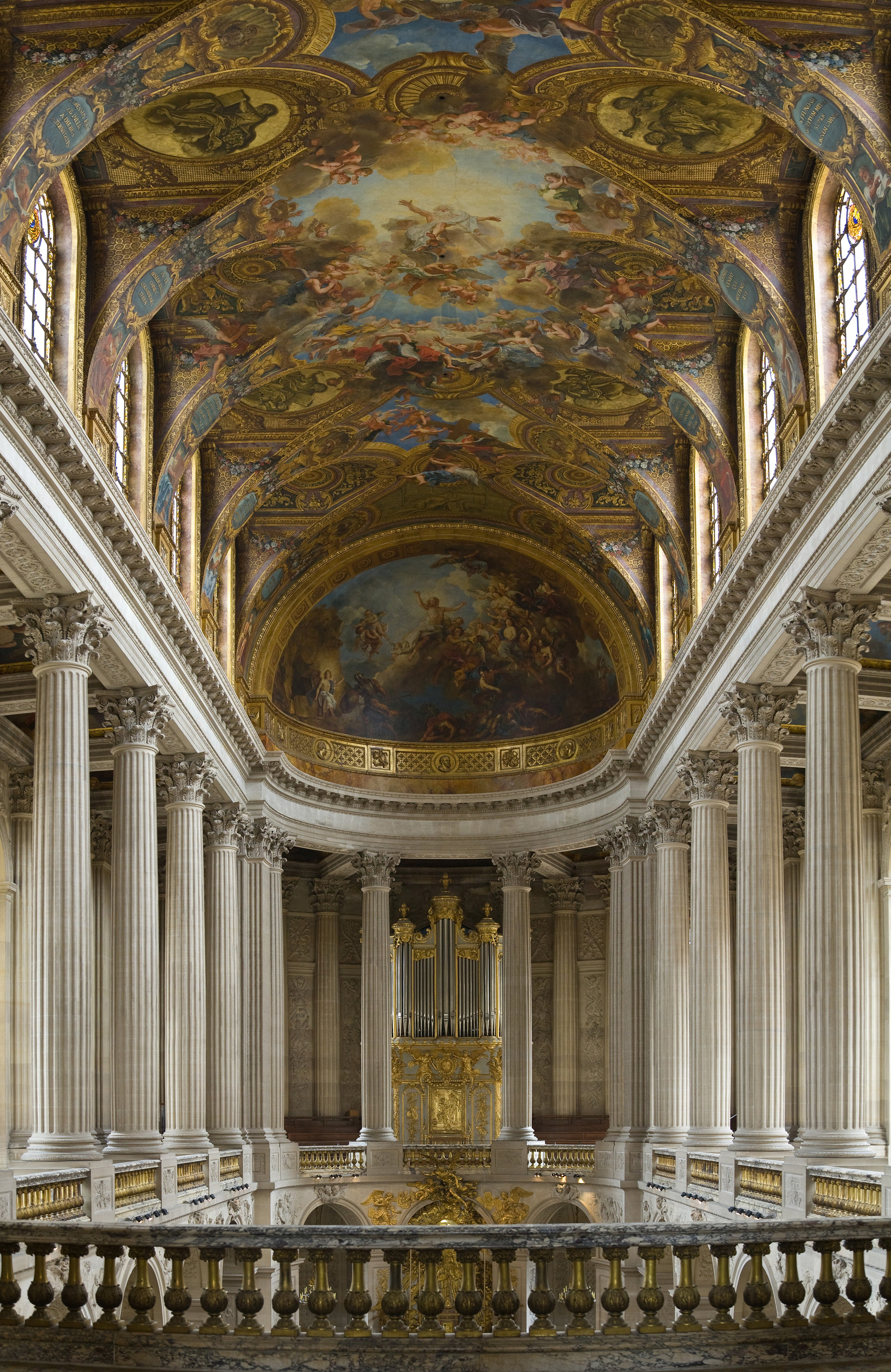
Chapel of the Palace of Versailles, 1696–1710

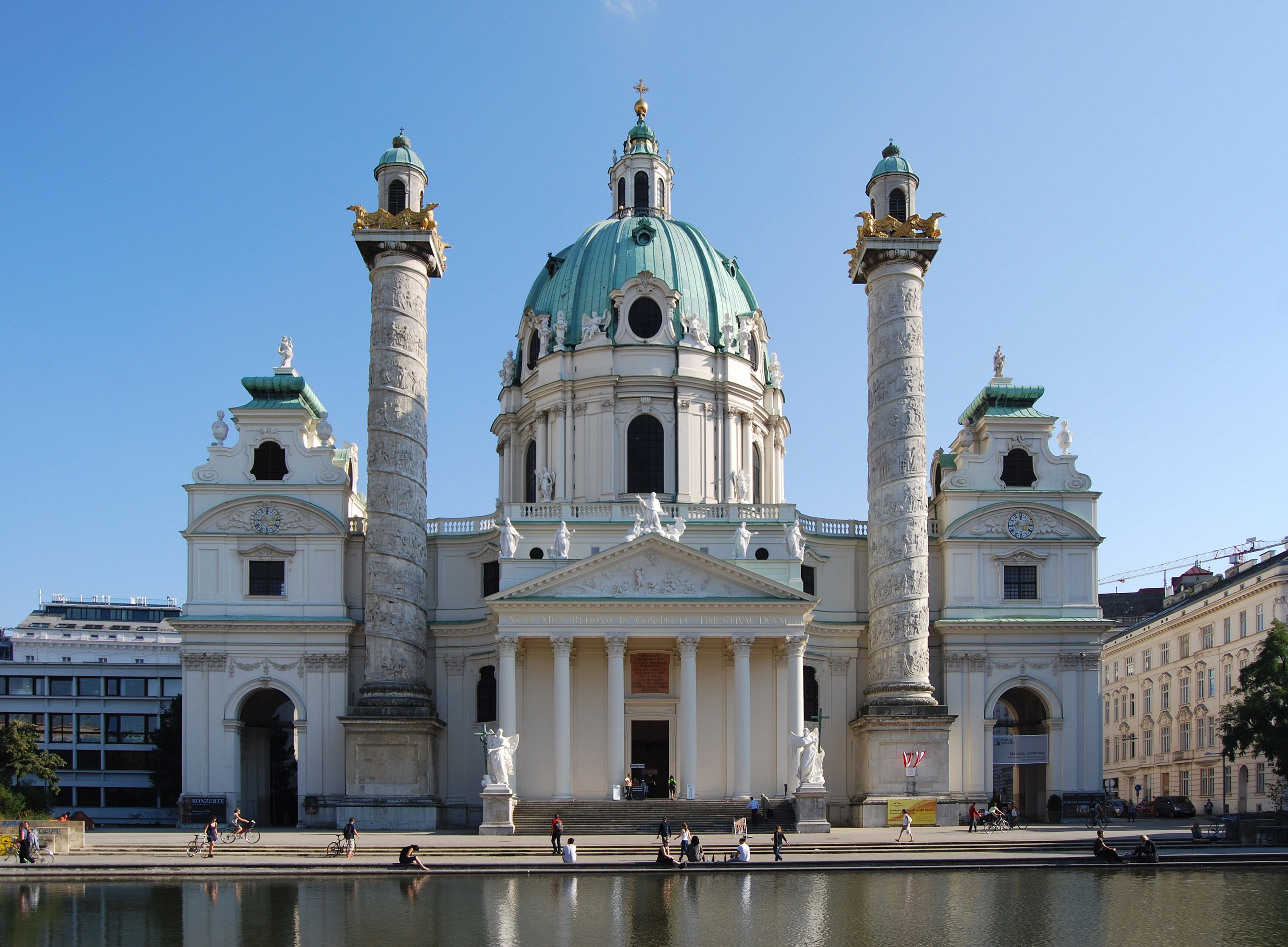
Karlskirche, Vienna, Austria, by Johann Bernhard Fischer von Erlach, 1715-1737

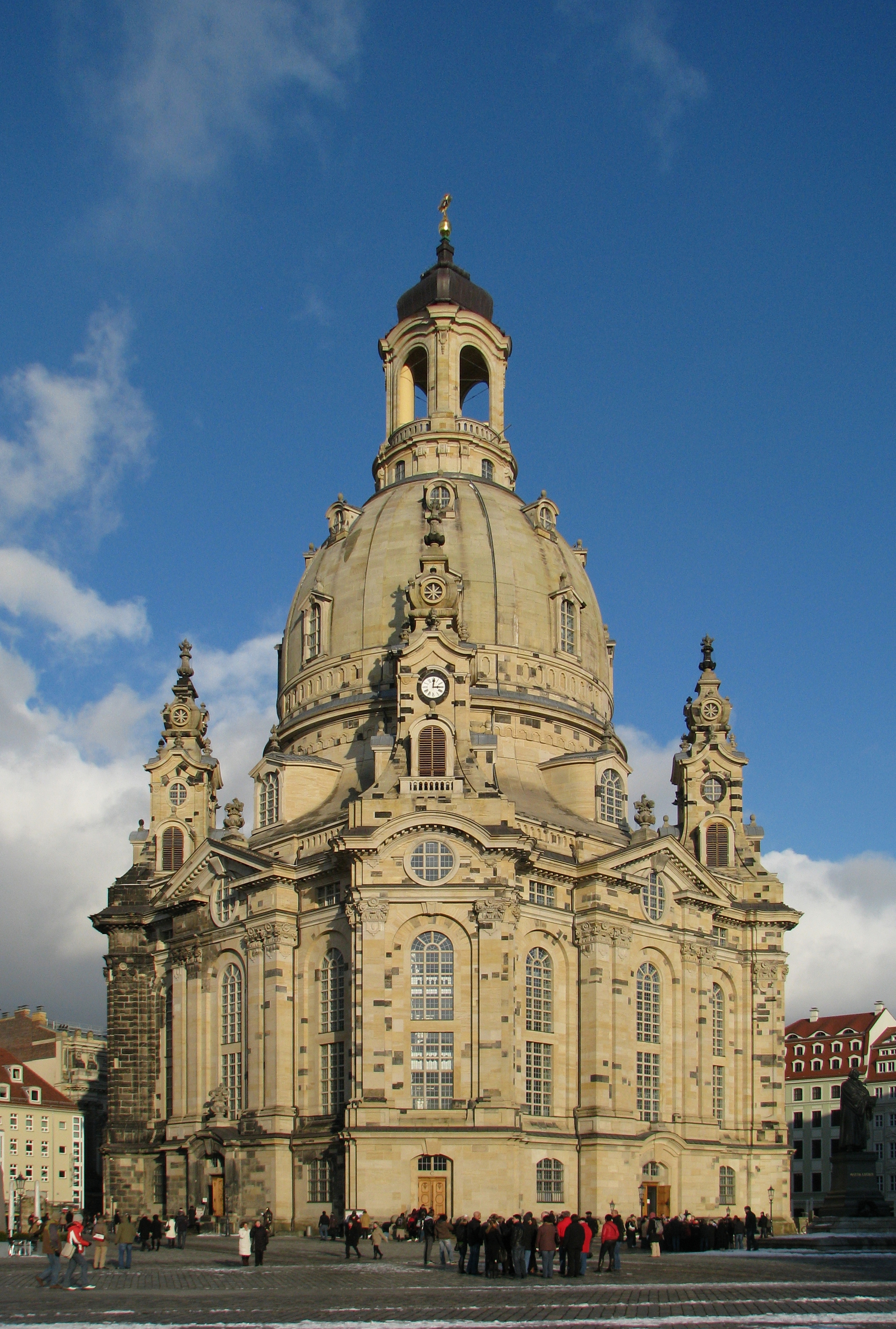
Frauenkirche, Dresden, Germany, by George Bähr, 1726–1743

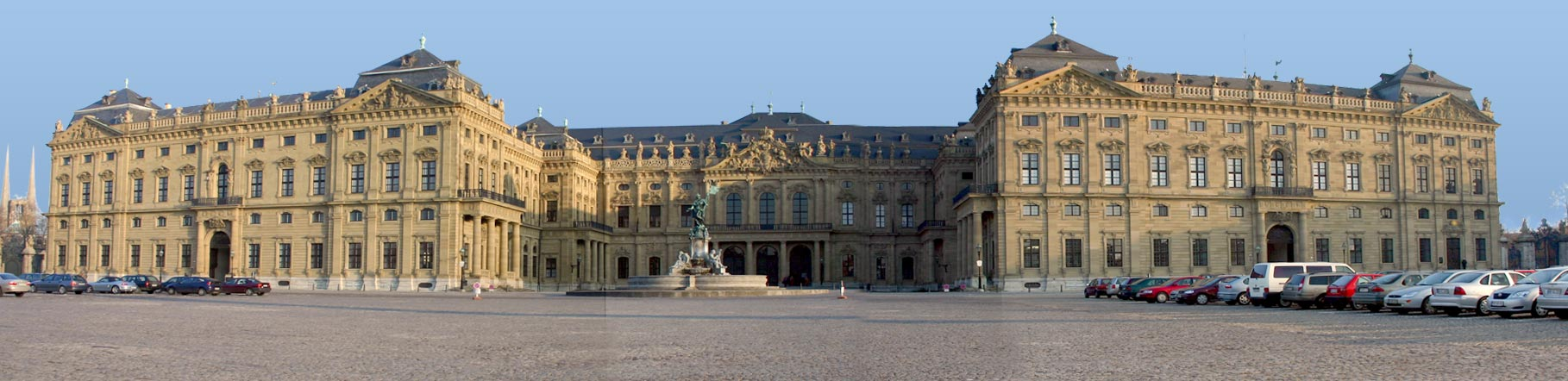
The Würzburg Residence, Würzburg, Germany, by Balthasar Neumann, 1744–1780

The Baroque emerged from the Counter Reformation as an attempt by the Catholic Church in Rome to convey its power and to emphasize the magnificence of God. The Baroque and its late variant the Rococo were the first truly global styles in the arts. Dominating more than two centuries of art and architecture in Europe, Latin America and beyond from circa 1580 to circa 1800. Born in the painting studios of Bologna and Rome in the 1580s and 1590s, and in Roman sculptural and architectural ateliers in the second and third decades of the 17th century, the Baroque spread swiftly throughout Italy, Spain and Portugal, Flanders, France, the Netherlands, England, Scandinavia, and Russia, as well as to central and eastern European centres from Munich (Germany) to Vilnius (Lithuania). The Portuguese, Spanish and French empires and the Dutch treading network had a leading role in spreading the two styles into the Americas and colonial Africa and Asia, to places such as Lima, Mozambique, Goa and the Philippines. Due to its spread in regions with different architectural traditions, multiple kinds of Baroque appeared based on location, different in some aspects, but similar overall. For example, French Baroque appeared severe and detached by comparison, preempting Neoclassicism and the architecture of the Age of Enlightenment. Hybrid Native American/European Baroque architecture first appeared in South America (as opposed to Mexico) in the late 17th century, after the indigenous symbols and styles that characterize this unusual variant of Baroque had been kept alive over the preceding century in other media, a very good example of this being the Jesuit Church in Arequipa (Peru).

The first Baroque buildings were cathedrals, churches and monasteries, soon joined by civic buildings, mansions, and palaces. Being characterized by dynamism, for the first time walls, façades and interiors curved, a good example being San Carlo alle Quattro Fontane in Rome. Baroque architects took the basic elements of Renaissance architecture, including domes and colonnades, and made them higher, grander, more decorated, and more dramatic. The interior effects were often achieved with the use of quadratura, or trompe-l'œil painting combined with sculpture: the eye is drawn upward, giving the illusion that one is looking into the heavens. Clusters of sculpted angels and painted figures crowd the ceiling. Light was also used for dramatic effect; it streamed down from cupolas and was reflected from an abundance of gilding. Solomonic columns were often used, to give an illusion of upwards motion and other decorative elements occupied every available space. In Baroque palaces, grand stairways became a central element. Besides architecture, Baroque painting and sculpture are characterized by dynamism too. This is in contrast with how static and peaceful Renaissance art is.

Besides the building itself, the space where it was placed had a role too. Both Baroque and Rococo buildings try to seize viewers' attention and to dominate their surroundings, whether on a small scale such as the San Carlo alle Quattro Fontane in Rome, or on a massive one, like the new facade of the Santiago de Compostela Cathedral, designed to tower over the city. A manifestation of power and authority on the grandest scale, Baroque urban planning and renewal was promoted by the church and the state alike. It was the first era since antiquity to experience mass migration into cities, and urban planners took idealistic measures to regulate them. The most notable early example was Domenico Fontana's restructuring of Rome's street plan of Pope Sixtus V. Architects had experimented with idealized city schemes since the early Renaissance, examples being Leon Battista Alberti (1404–1472) planning a centralized model city, with streets leading to a central piazza, or Filarete (Antonio di Pietro Aver(u)lino, c. 1400-c. 1469) designing a round city named Sforzinda (1451–1456) that he based on parts of the human body in the idea that a healthy city should reflect the physiognomy of its inhabitants. However, none of these idealistic cities has ever been built. In fact, few such projects were put into practice in Europe as new cities were prohibitively costly and existing urban areas, with existing churches and palaces, could not be demolished. Only in the Americas, where architects often had a clean space to work with, were such cities possible, as in Lima (Peru) or Buenos Aires (Argentina). The earliest Baroque ideal city is Zamość, built north-east of Kraków (Poland) by the Italian architect Bernardo Morando (c. 1540-1600), being a centralized town focusing on a square with radiating streets. Where entire cities could not be rebuilt, patrons and architects compensated by creating spacious and symmetrical squares, often with avenues and radiating out at perpendicular angles and focusing on a fountain, statue or obelisk. A good example of this is the Place des Vosges (formerly Place Royale), commissioned by Henry IV probably after plans by Baptiste du Cerceau (1545–1590). The most famous Baroque space in the world is Gianlorenzo Bernini's St. Peter's Square in Rome. Similar to ideal urban planning, Baroque gardens are characterized by straight and readapting avenues, with geometric spaces.

=== Rococo ===
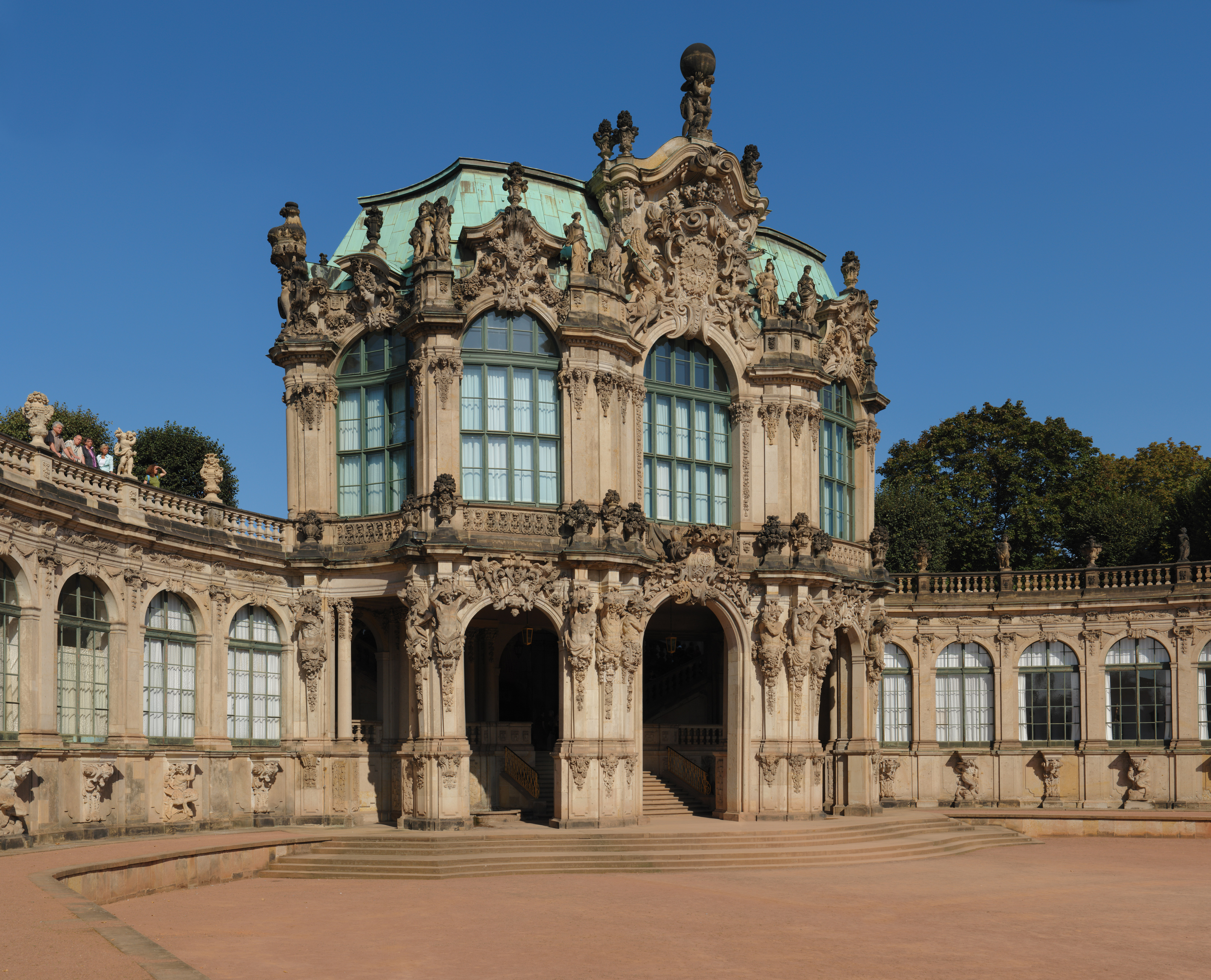
Zwinger, Dresden, Germany, by Matthäus Daniel Pöppelmann, 1719

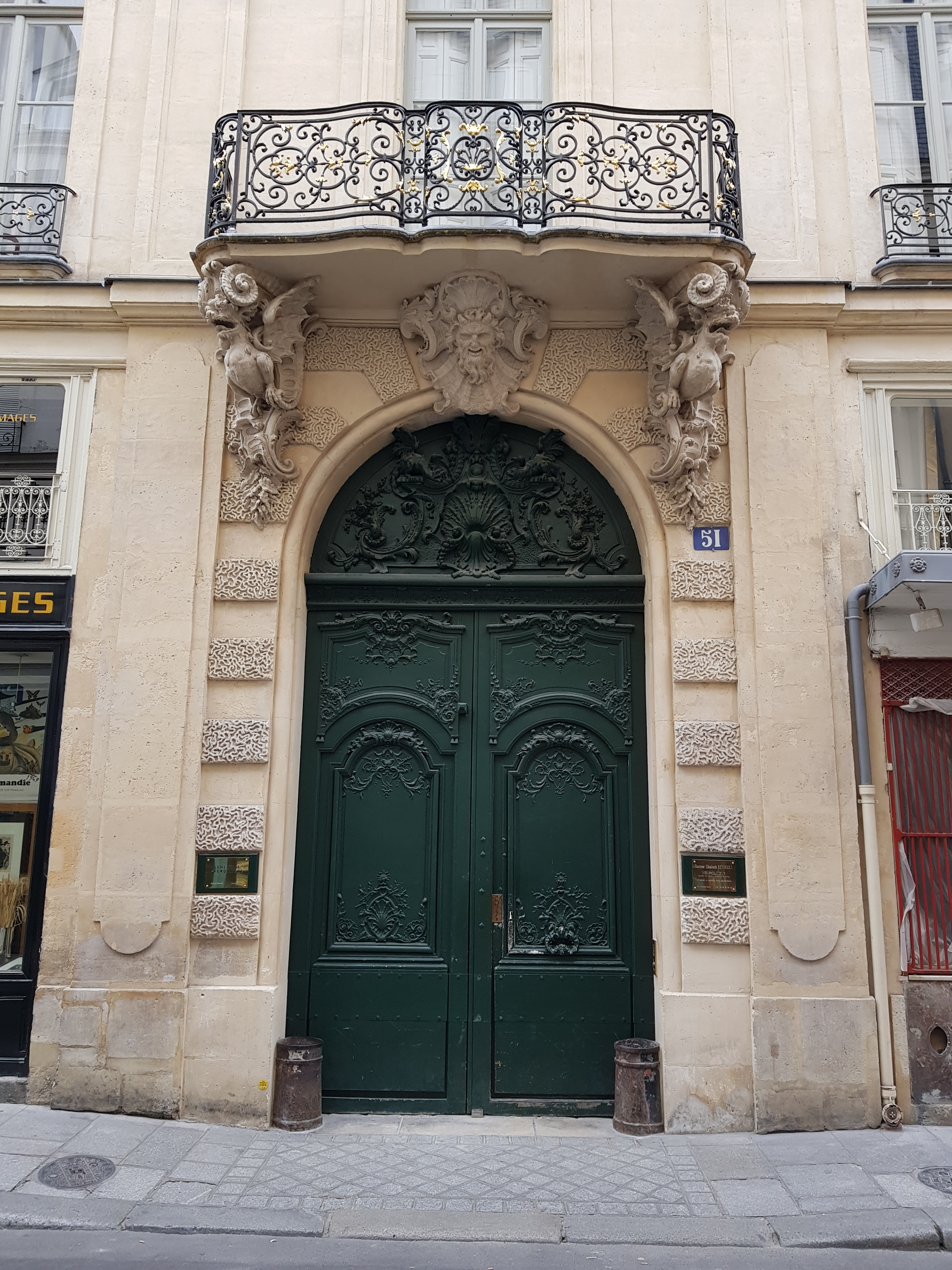
Door of the Hôtel de Chenizot, Paris, by Pierre Vigné de Vigny, 1719

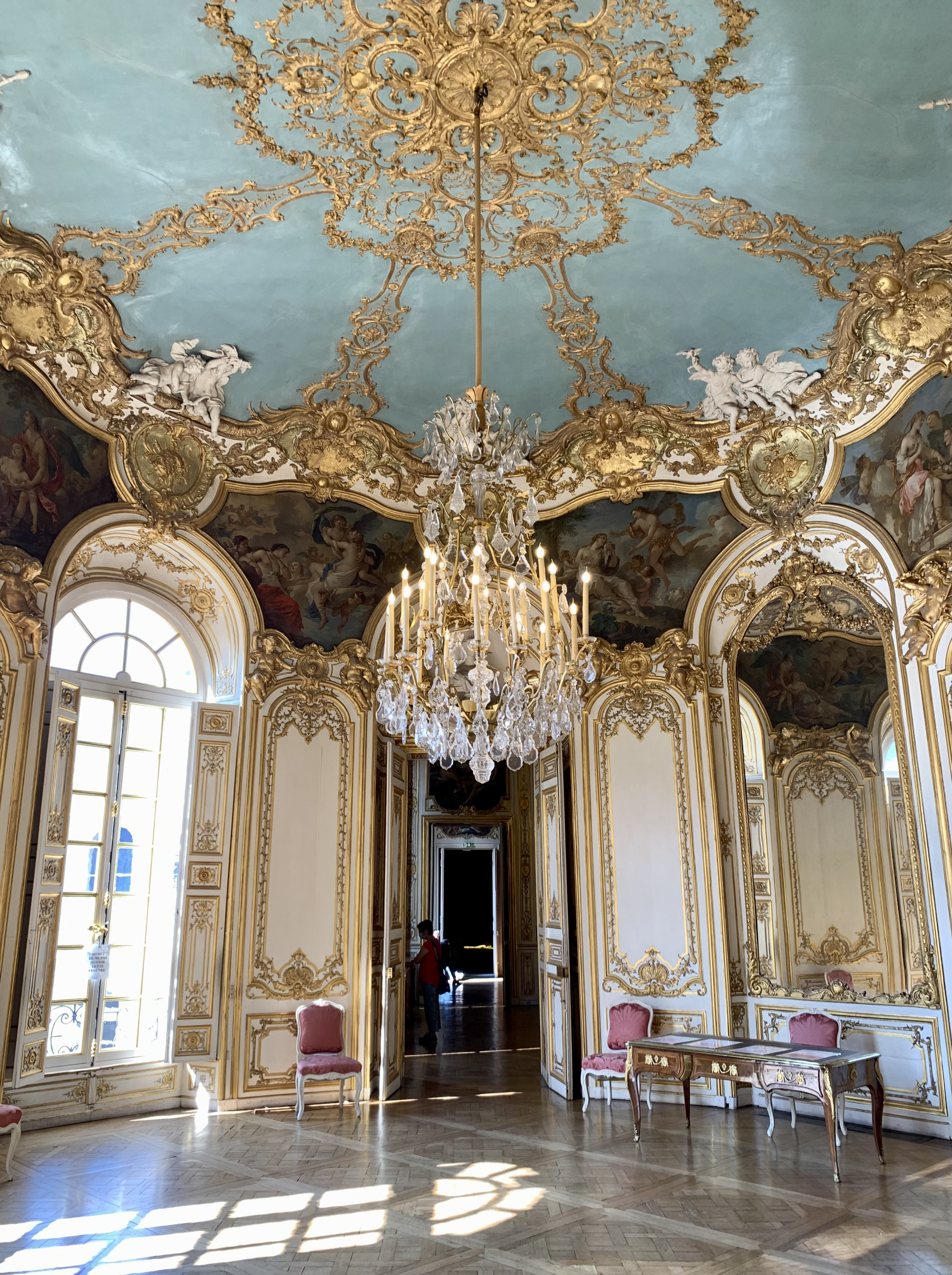
The ceiling of the oval Salon of the Princesse in Hôtel de Soubise, Paris, by Germain Boffrand, 1740

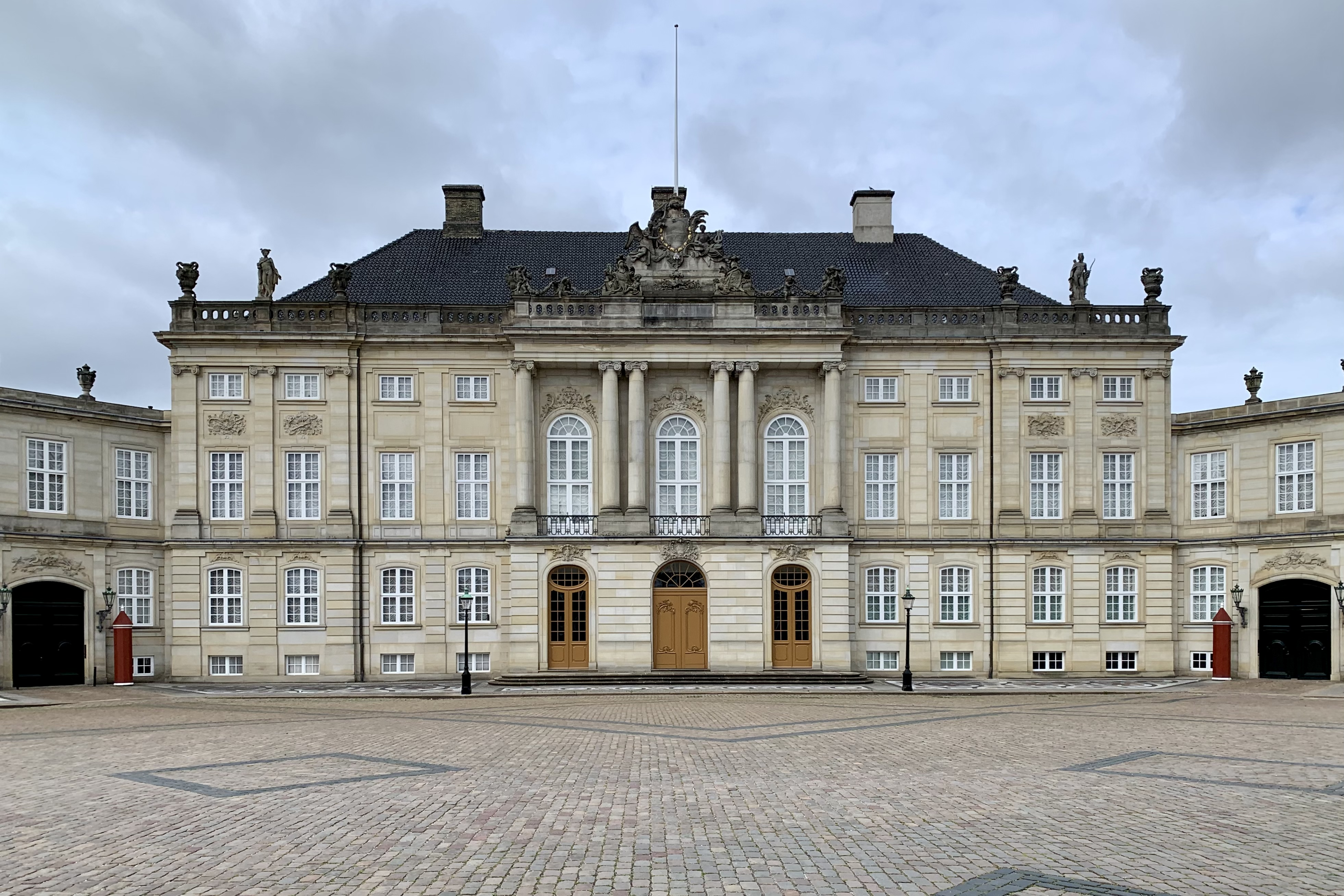
Amalienborg, Copenhagen, Denmark, by Nicolai Eigtved, 1750-1754

Palace of Queluz, Lisbon, Portugal, by Mateus Vicente de Oliveira, 1752

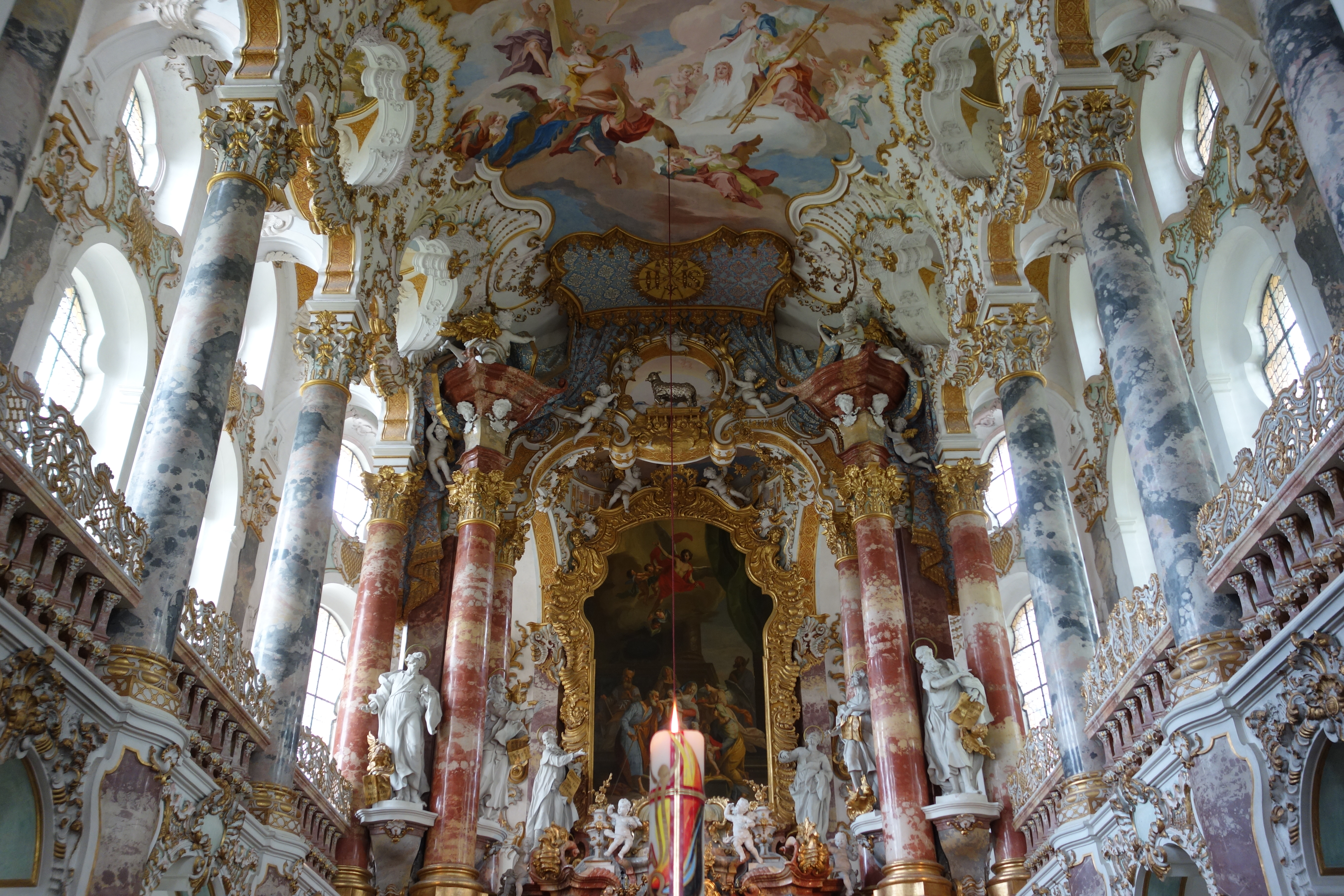
Pilgrimage Church of Wies, Steingaden, Germany, by Dominikus and Johann Baptist Zimmermann, 1754

The name Rococo derives from the French word rocaille, which describes shell-covered rock-work, and coquille, meaning seashell. Rococo architecture is fancy and fluid, accentuating asymmetry, with an abundant use of curves, scrolls, gilding and ornaments. The style enjoyed great popularity with the ruling elite of Europe during the first half of the 18th century. It developed in France out of a new fashion in interior decoration, and spread across Europe. Domestic Rococo abandoned Baroque's high moral tone, its weighty allegories and its obsession with legitimacy: in fact, its abstract forms and carefree, pastoral subjects related more to notions of refuge and joy that created a more forgiving atmosphere for polite conversations. Rococo rooms are typically smaller than their Baroque counterparts, reflecting a movement towards domestic intimacy. Even the grander salons used for entertaining were more modest in scale, as social events involved smaller numbers of guests.

Characteristic of the style were Rocaille motifs derived from the shells, icicles and rock-work or grotto decoration. Rocaille arabesques were mostly abstract forms, laid out symmetrically over and around architectural frames. A favourite motif was the scallop shell, whose top scrolls echoed the basic S and C framework scrolls of the arabesques and whose sinuous ridges echoed the general curvilinearity of the room decoration. While few Rococo exteriors were built in France, a number of Rococo churches are found in southern Germany. Other widely-user motifs in decorative arts and interior architecture include: acanthus and other leaves, birds, bouquets of flowers, fruits, elements associated with love (putti, quivers with arrows ans arrowed hearts), trophies of arms, medallions with faces, many many flowers, and Far Eastern elements (pagodes, dragons, monkeys, bizarre flowers, bamboo, and Chinese people). Pastel colours were widely used, like light blue, mint green or pink. Rococo designers also loved mirrors (the more the better), an example being the Hall of Mirrors of the Amalienburg (Munich, Germany), by Johann Baptist Zimmermann. Generally, mirrors are also featured above fireplaces.

=== Exoticism ===
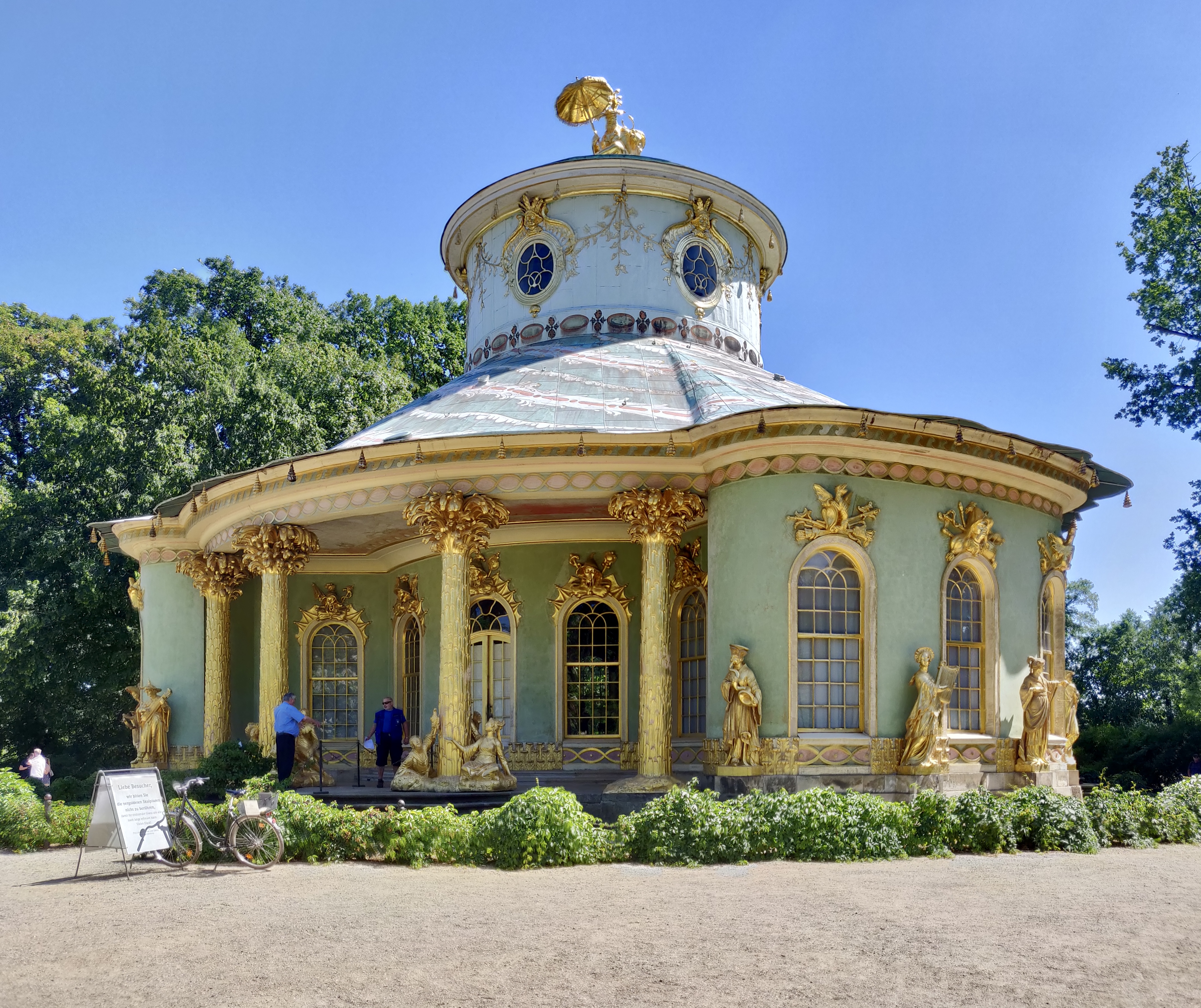
Chinese inspiration/Chinoiserie - Chinese House, Sanssouci Park, Potsdam, Germany, by Johann Gottfried Büring, 1755-1764

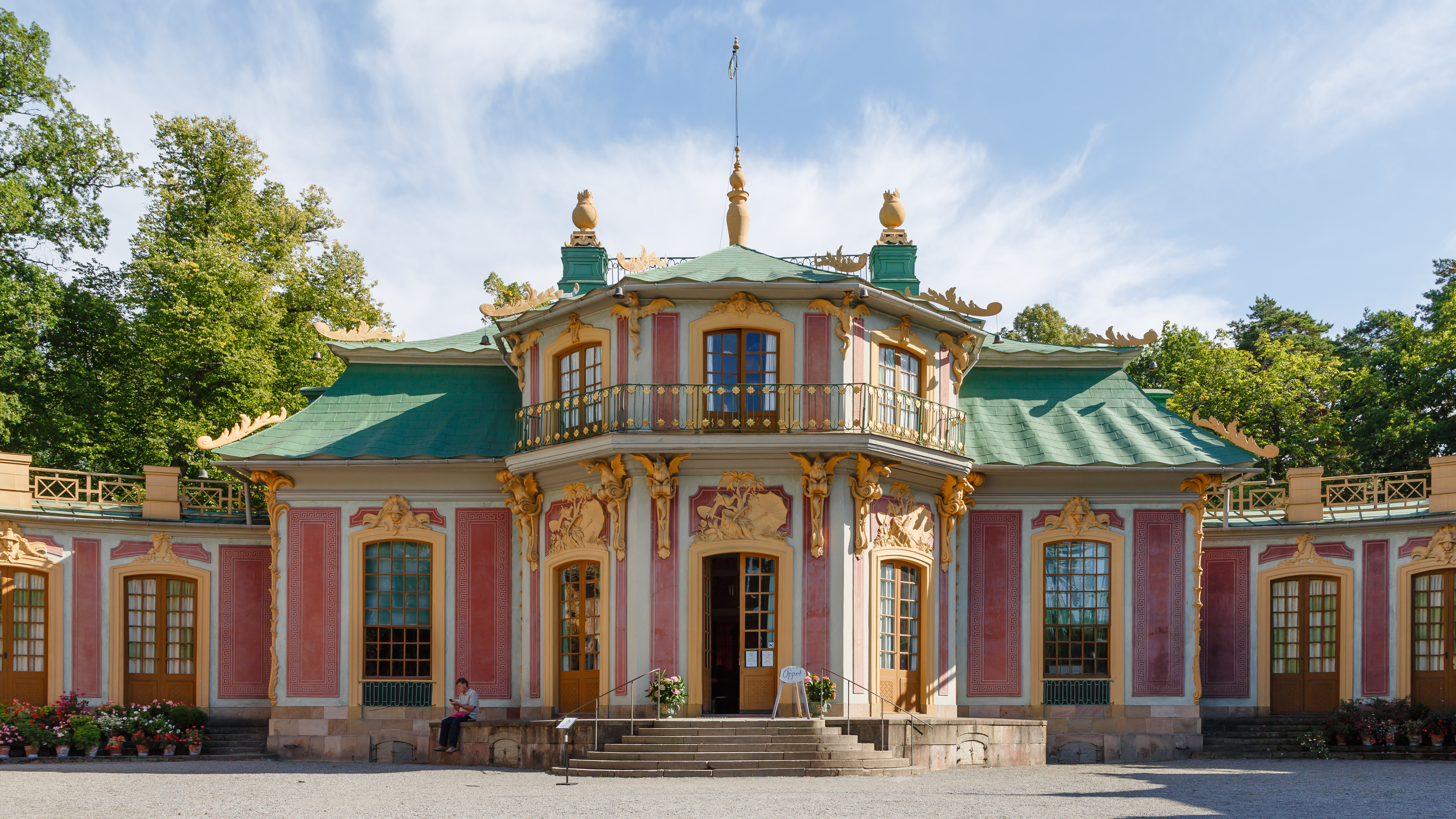
Chinese inspiration/Chinoiserie - Chinese Pavilion, Ekerö, Sweden, by Carl Fredrik Adelcrantz, 1763–1769

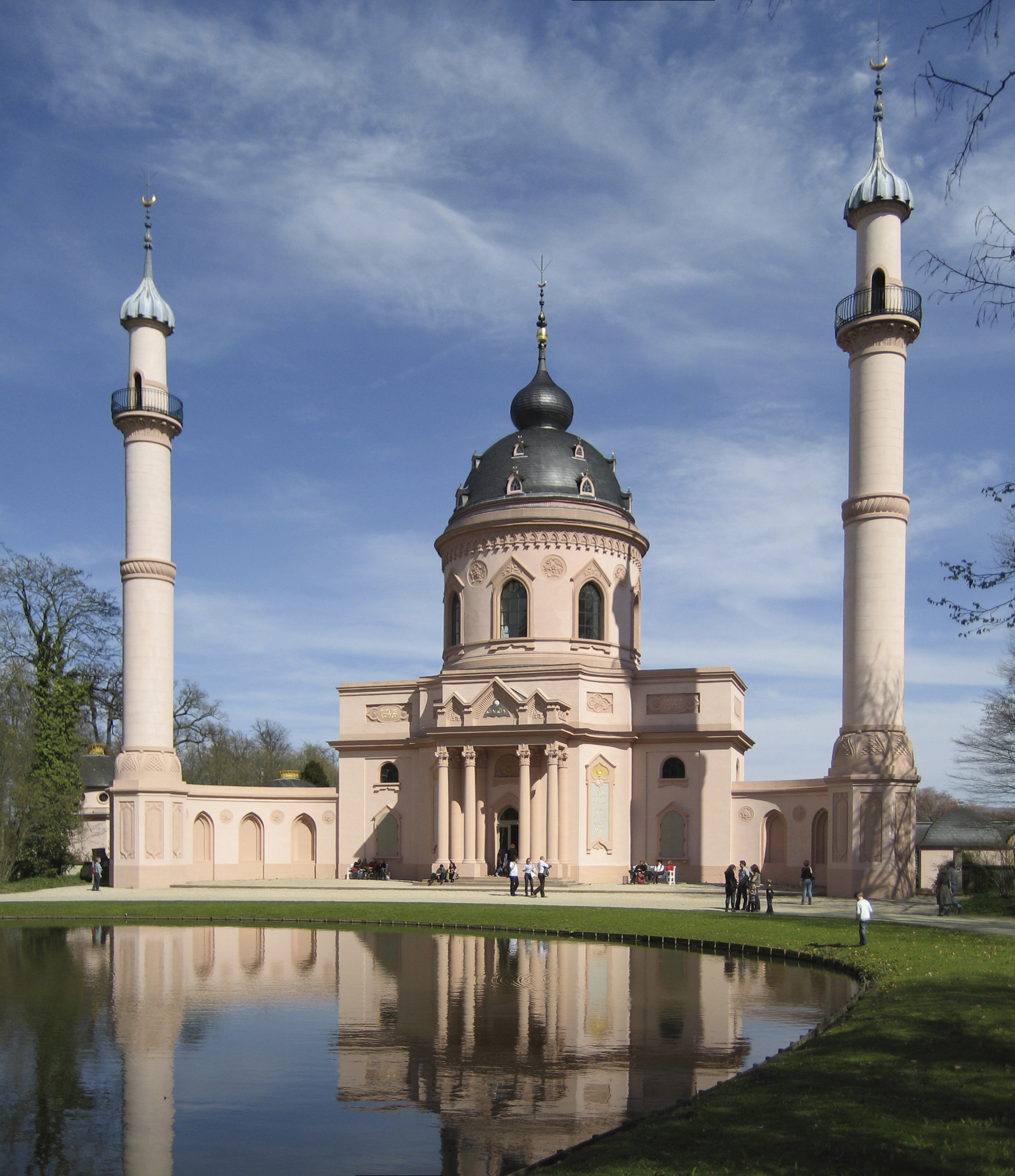
Islamic inspiration - Garden Mosque of the Schwetzingen Palace, Germany, by Nicolas de Pigage, 1779-1795

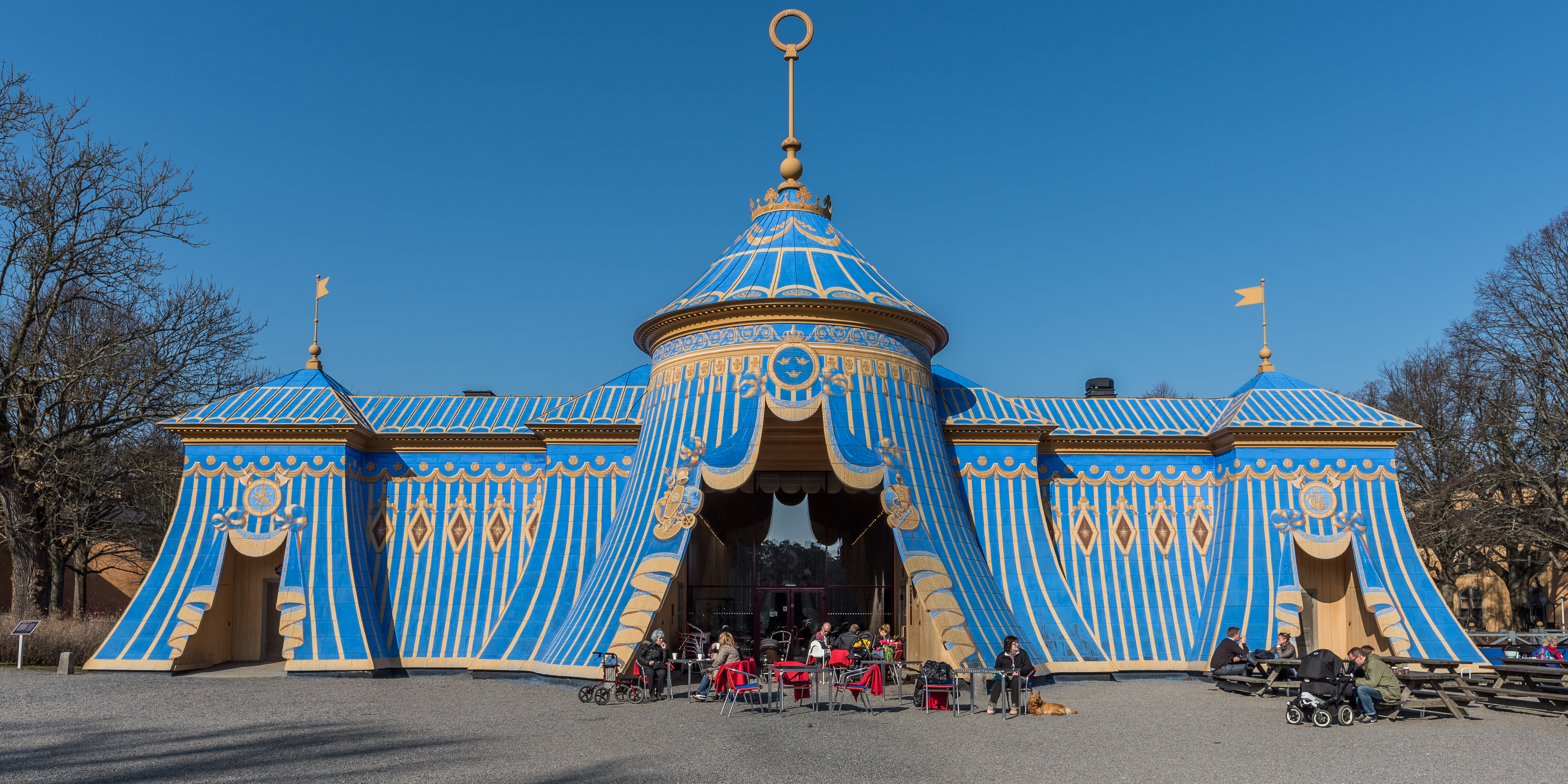
Islamic inspiration - Turkish Tent, Hagaparken, Stockholm, Sweden, by Louis Jean Desprez, 1787

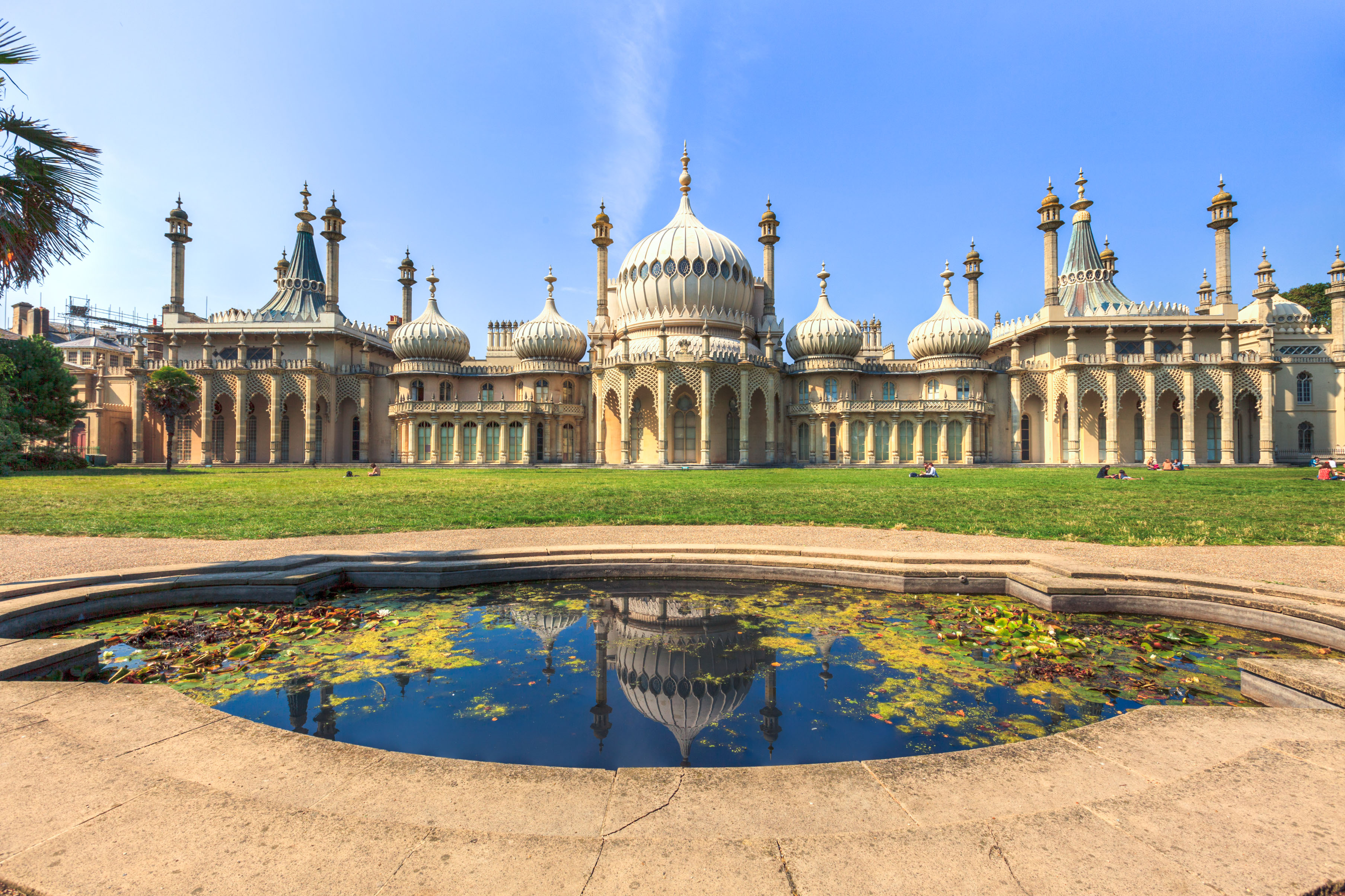
Islamic inspiration - Royal Pavilion, Brighton, UK, by John Nash, 1787-1823

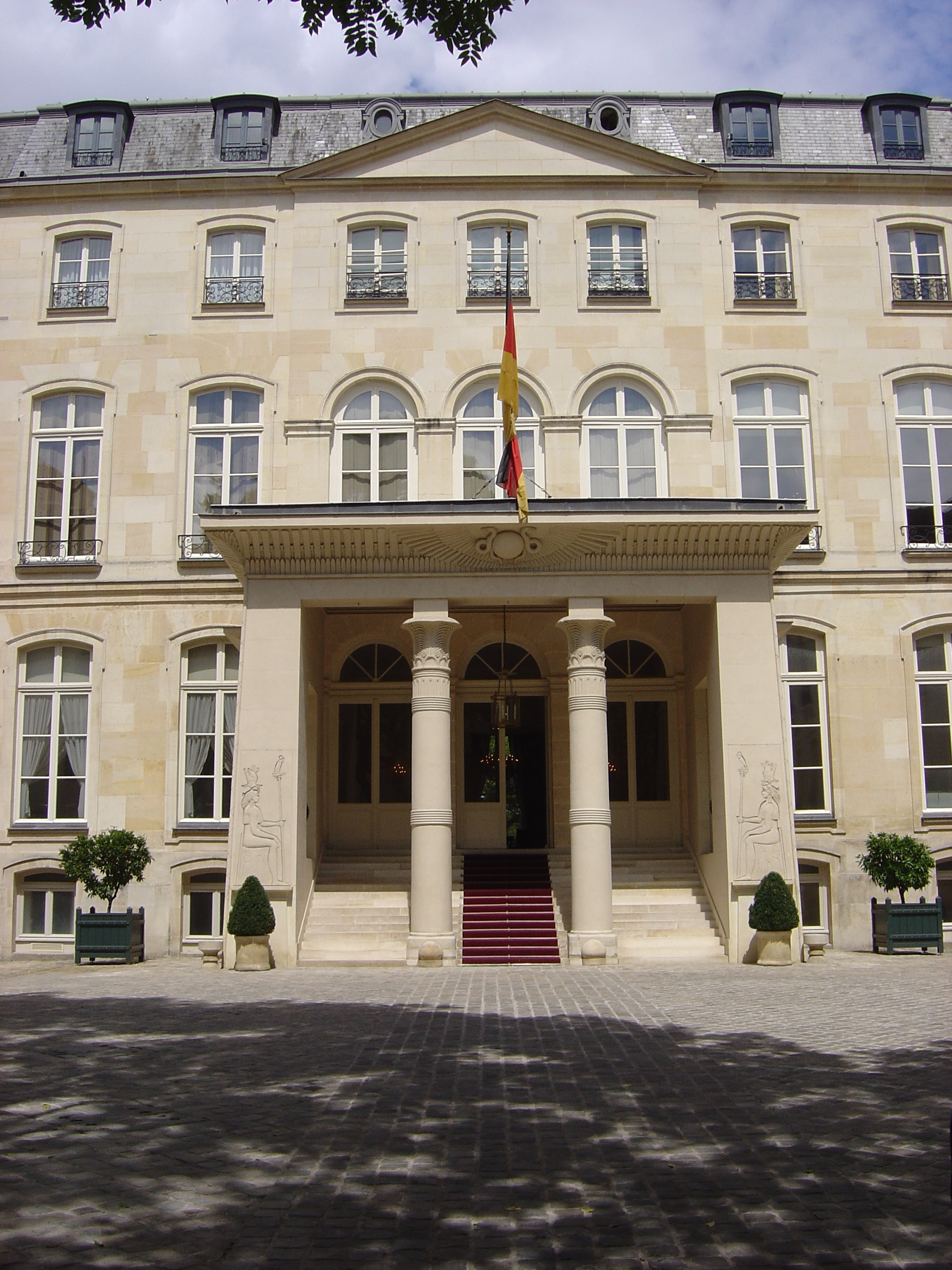
Egyptian inspiration/Egyptian Revival - portico of the Hôtel Beauharnais, Paris, Laurent-Edmé Bataille, c.1804

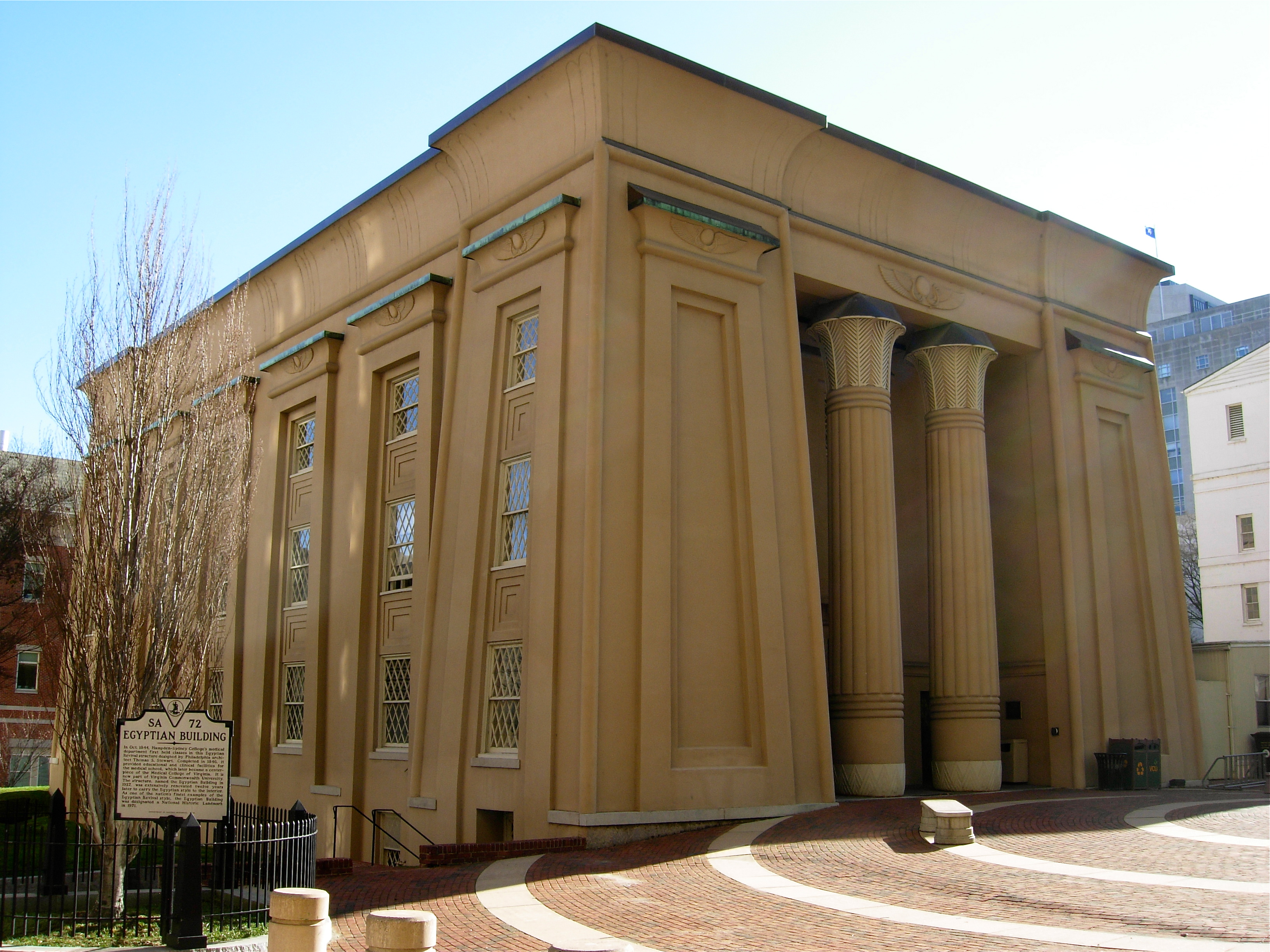
Egyptian inspiration/Egyptian Revival - Egyptian Building, part of the Virginia Commonwealth University, Richmond, Virginia, USA, by Thomas Stewart, 1845

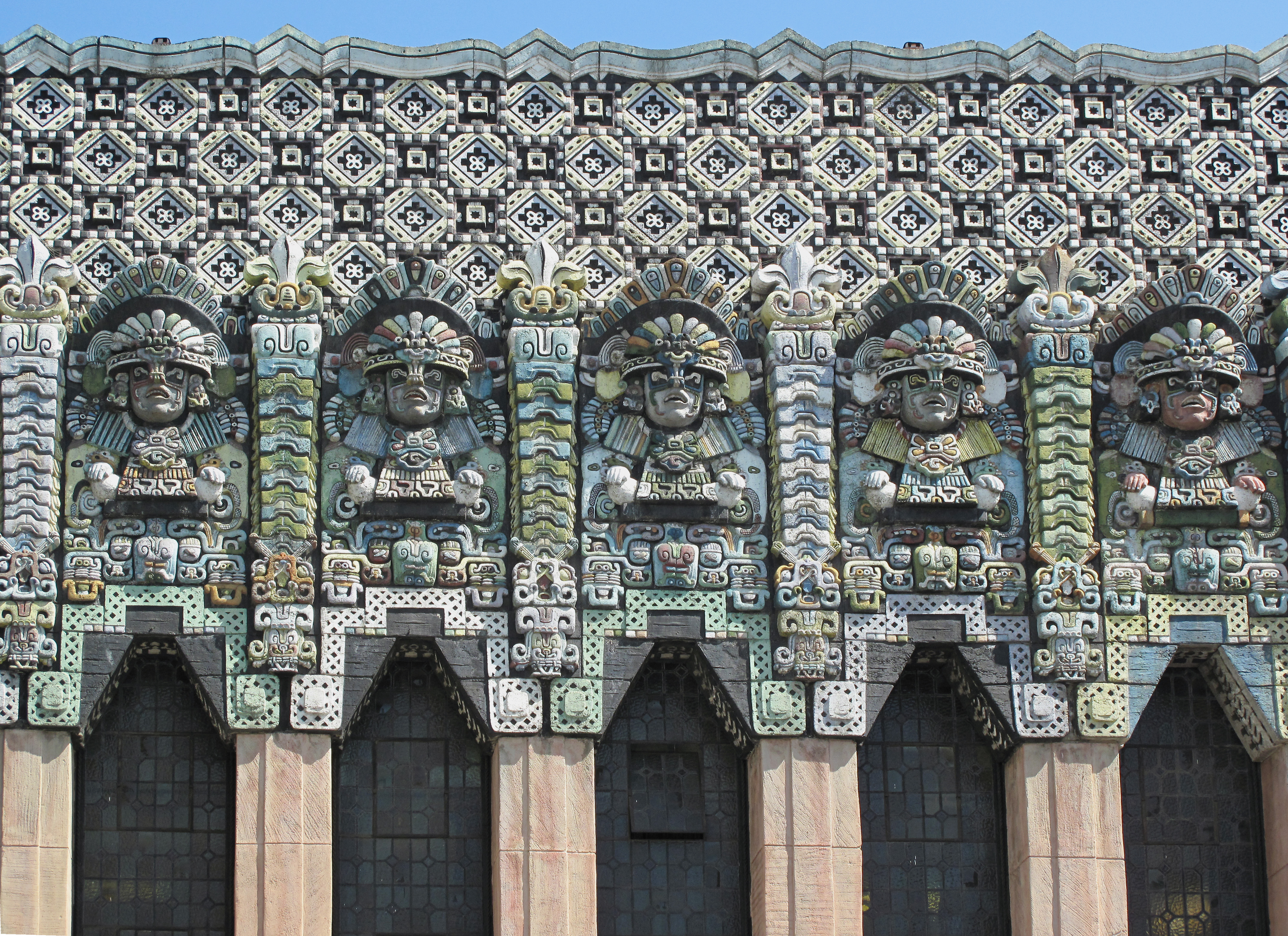
Pre-Columbian inspiration/Mayan Revival - facade detail of the Mayan Theater, Los Angeles, USA, by Stiles O. Clements, 1927

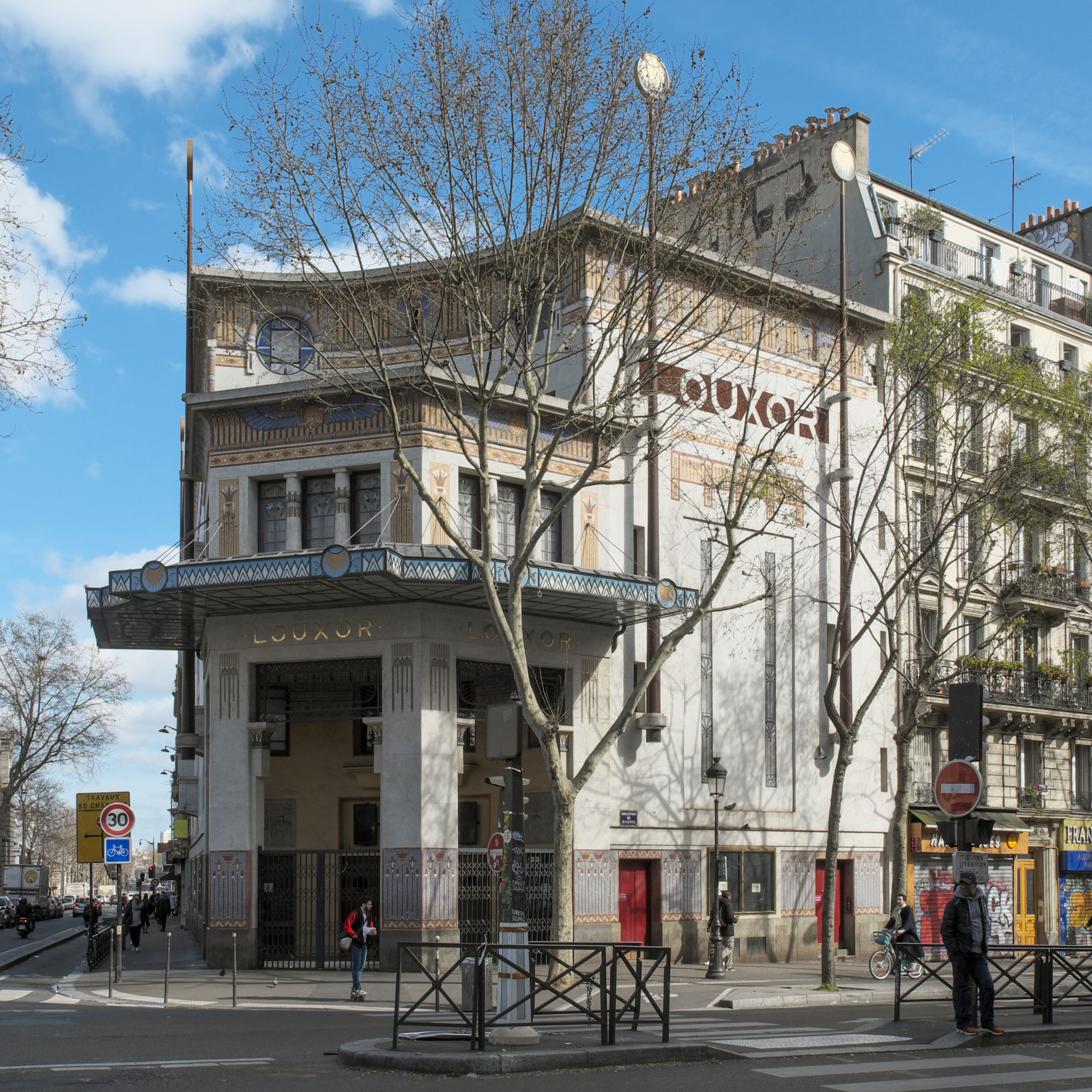
Egyptian inspiration/mix of Egyptian Revival and Art Deco - Le Louxor Cinema, Paris, by Henri Zipcy, 1919-1921

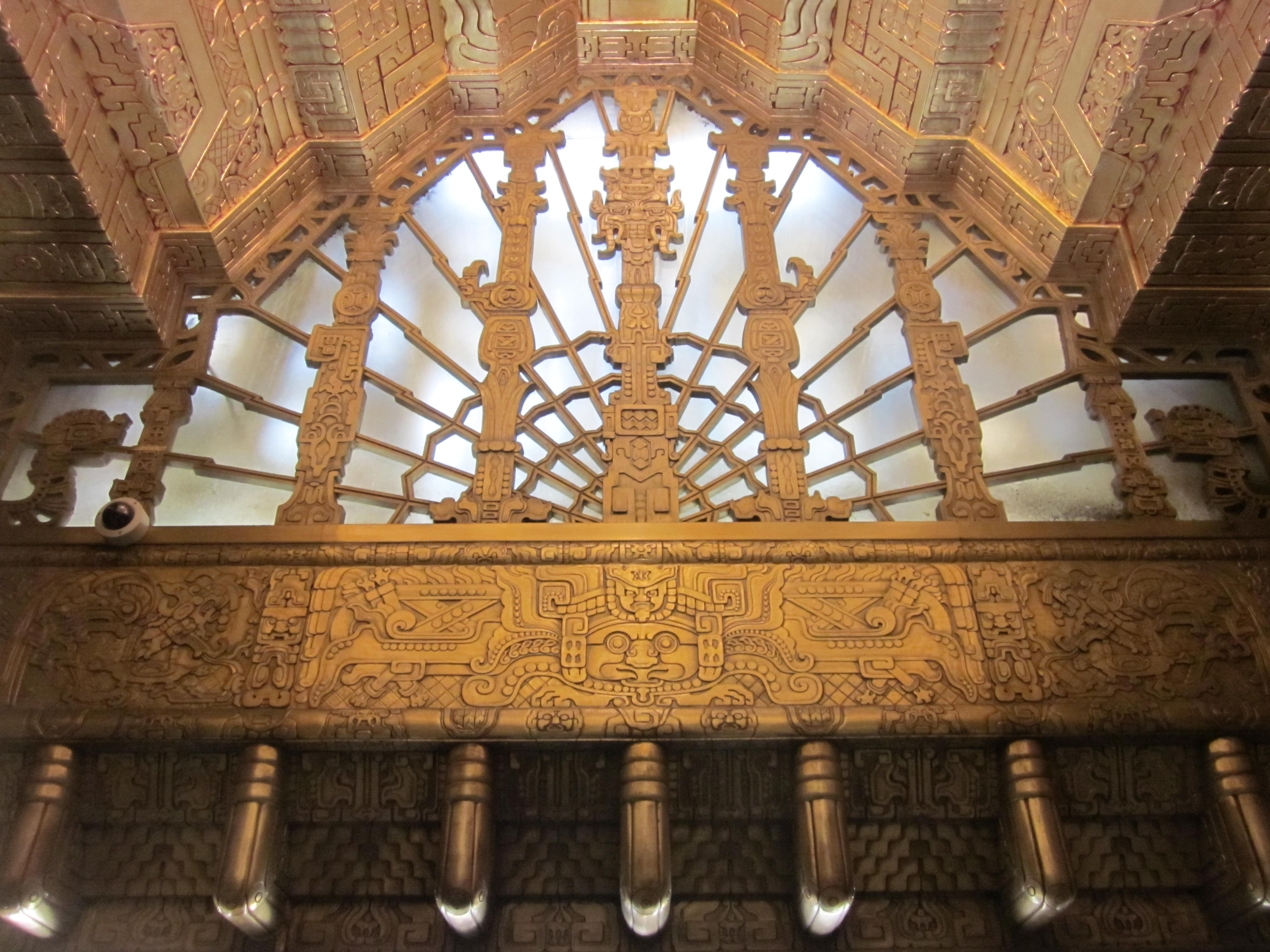
Pre-Columbian inspiration/mix of Mayan Revival and Art Deco - Interior detail of 450 Sutter Street, San Francisco, California, by Timothy L. Pflueger, 1929

The interactions between East and West brought on by colonialist exploration have had an impact on aesthetics. Because of being something rare and new to Westerners, some non-European styles were really appreciated during the 17th, 18th and 19th centuries. Some nobles and kings built little structures inspired by these styles in the gardens of their palaces, or fully decorated a handful of rooms of palaces like this. Because of not fully understanding the origins and principles that govern these exotic aesthetics, Europeans sometimes created hybrids of the style which they tried to replicate and which were the trends at that time. A good example of this is chinoiserie, a Western decorative style, popular during the 18th century, that was heavily inspired by Chinese arts, but also by Rococo at the same time. Because traveling to China or other Far Eastern countries was something hard at that time and so remained mysterious to most Westerners, European imagination were fuelled by perceptions of Asia as a place of wealth and luxury, and consequently patrons from emperors to merchants vied with each other in adorning their living quarters with Asian goods and decorating them in Asian styles. Where Asian objects were hard to obtain, European craftsmen and painters stepped up to fill the demand, creating a blend of Rococo forms and Asian figures, motifs and techniques.

Chinese art was not the only foreign style with which Europeans experimented. Another was the Islamic one. Examples of this include the Garden Mosque of the Schwetzingen Palace in Germany (the only surviving example of an 18th-century European garden mosque), the Royal Pavilion in Brighton, or the Moorish Revival buildings from the 19th and early 20th centuries, with horseshoe arches and brick patterns. When it come to the Orient, Europeans also had an interest for the culture of Ancient Egypt. Compared to other cases of exoticism, the one with the land of pharaohs is the oldest one, since Ancient Greeks and Romans had this interest during Antiquity. The main periods when Egyptian Revival monuments were erected were the early 19th century, with Napoleon's military campaigns in Egypt, and the 1920s, when the Tomb of Tutankhamun was discovered in 1922, which caused an Egyptomania that lead to Art Deco sometimes using motifs inspired by Ancient Egypt. During the late 18th and early 19th century, Neoclassicism sometimes mixed Greco-Roman elements with Egyptian ones. Because of its association with pharaohs, death and eternity, multiple Egyptian Revival tombs or cemetery entry gates were built in this style. Besides mortuary structures, other buildings in this style include certain synagogues, like the Karlsruhe Synagogue or some Empire monuments built during the reign of Napoleon, such as the Egyptian portico of the Hôtel Beauharnais or the Fontaine du Fellah. During the 1920s and 1930s, Pre-Columbian Mesoamerican architecture was of great interest for some American architects, particularly what the Mayans built. Several of Frank Lloyd Wright's California houses were erected in a Mayan Revival style, while other architects combined Mayan motifs with Art Deco ones.

=== Neoclassicism ===
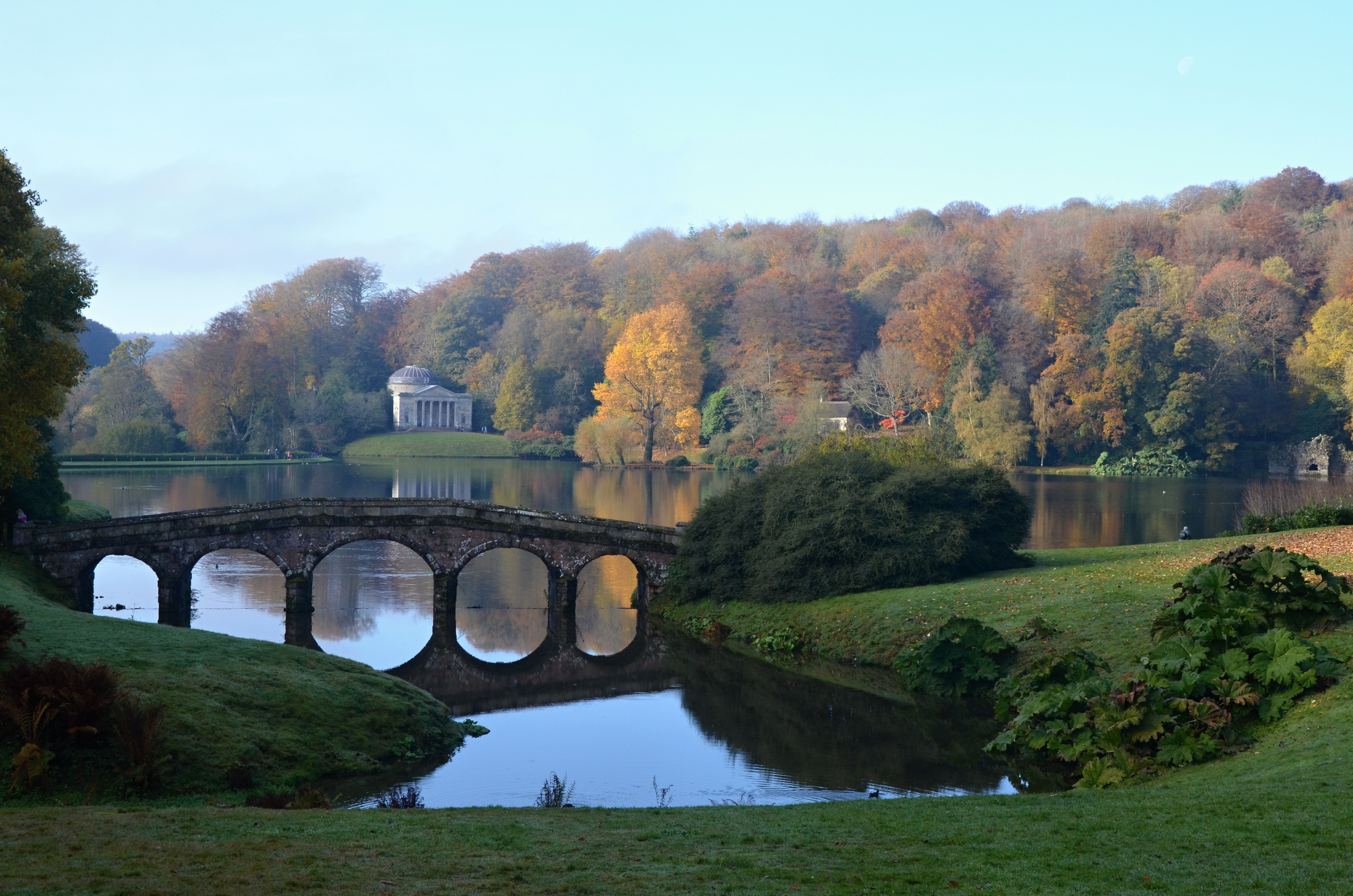
English landscape garden at Stourhead, UK, by Henry Hoare, the 1740s

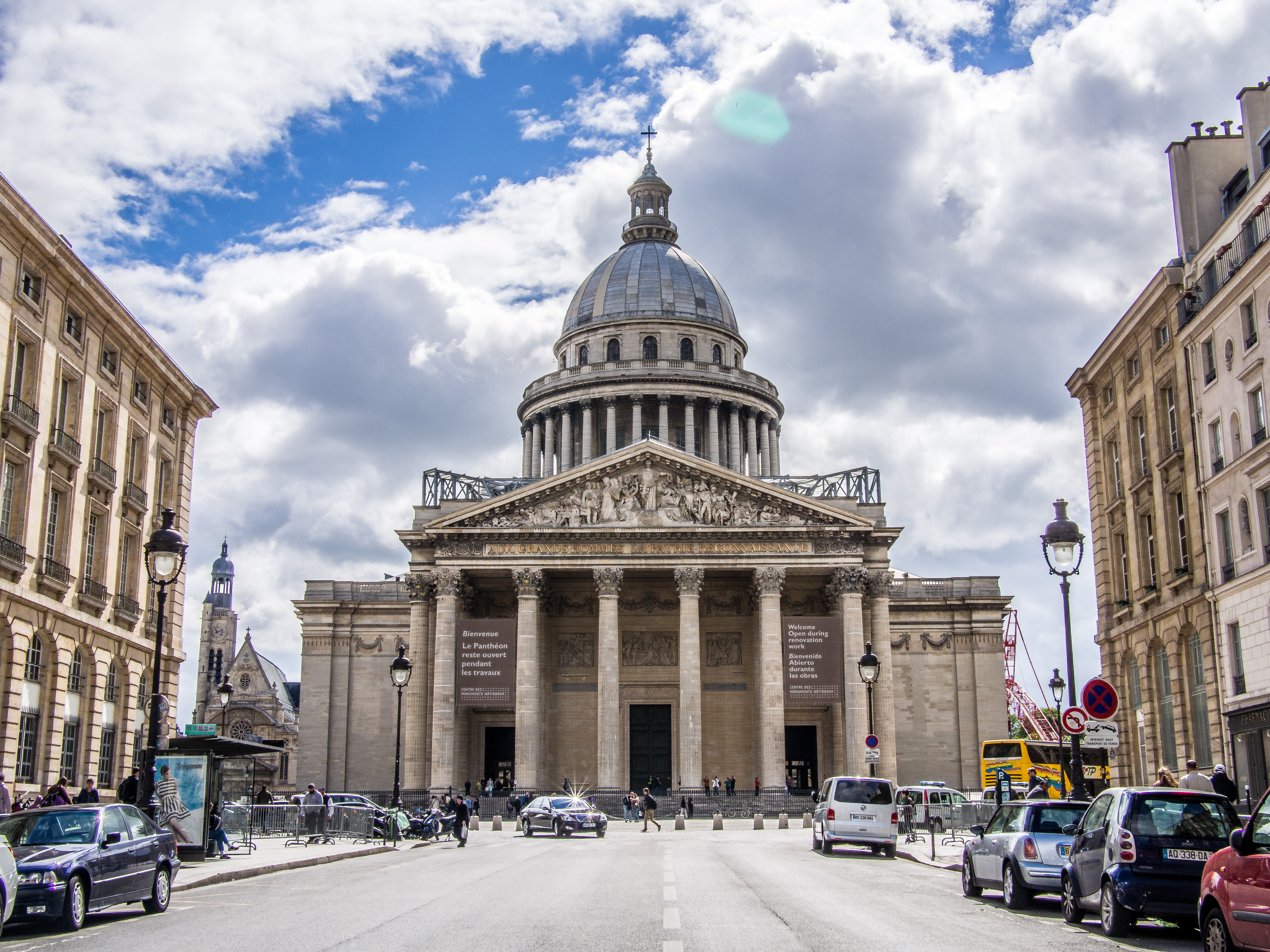
Panthéon, Paris, by Jacques-Germain Soufflot and Jean-Baptiste Rondelet, 1758–1790

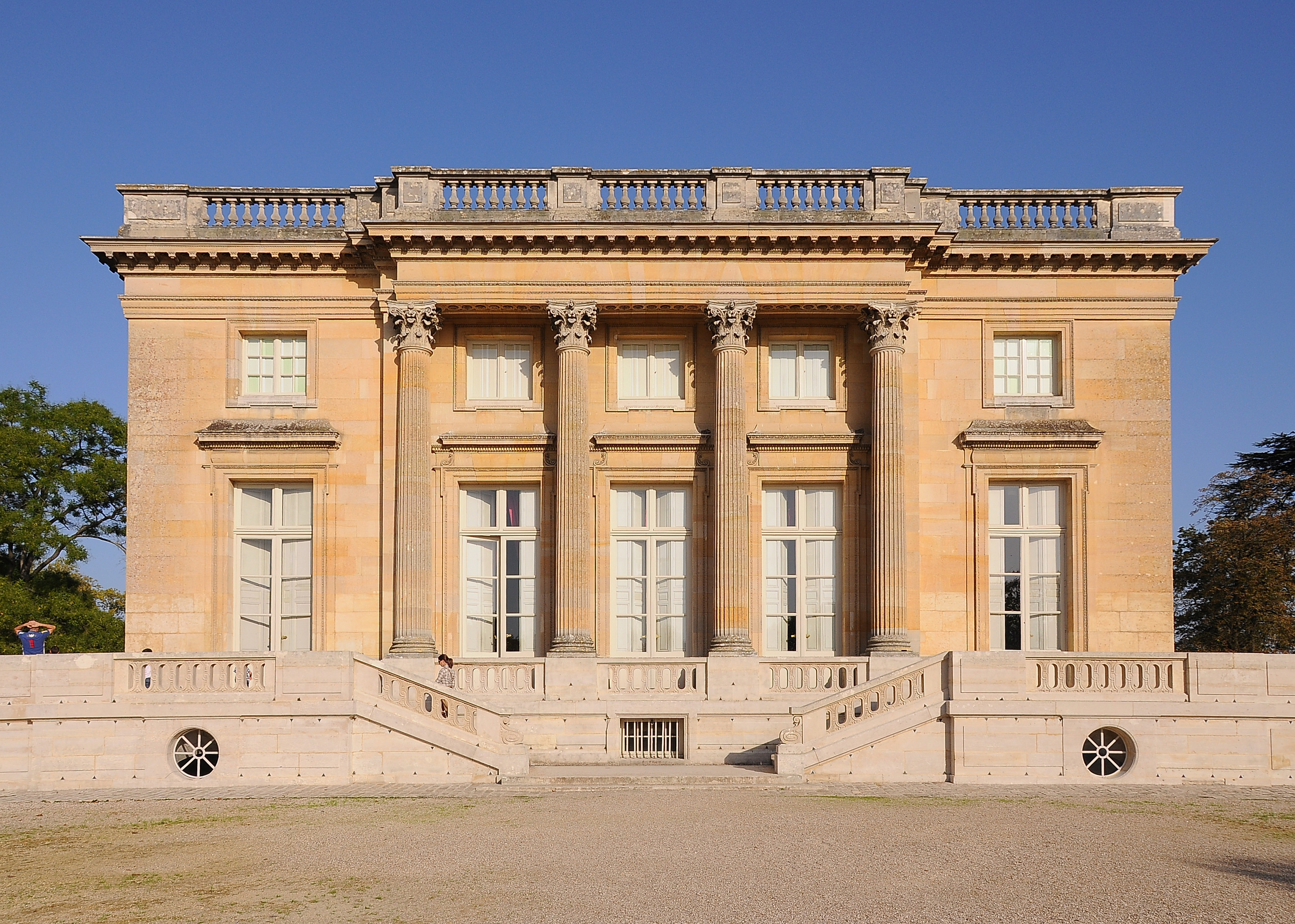
Petit Trianon, Versailles, France, by Ange-Jacques Gabriel, 1764

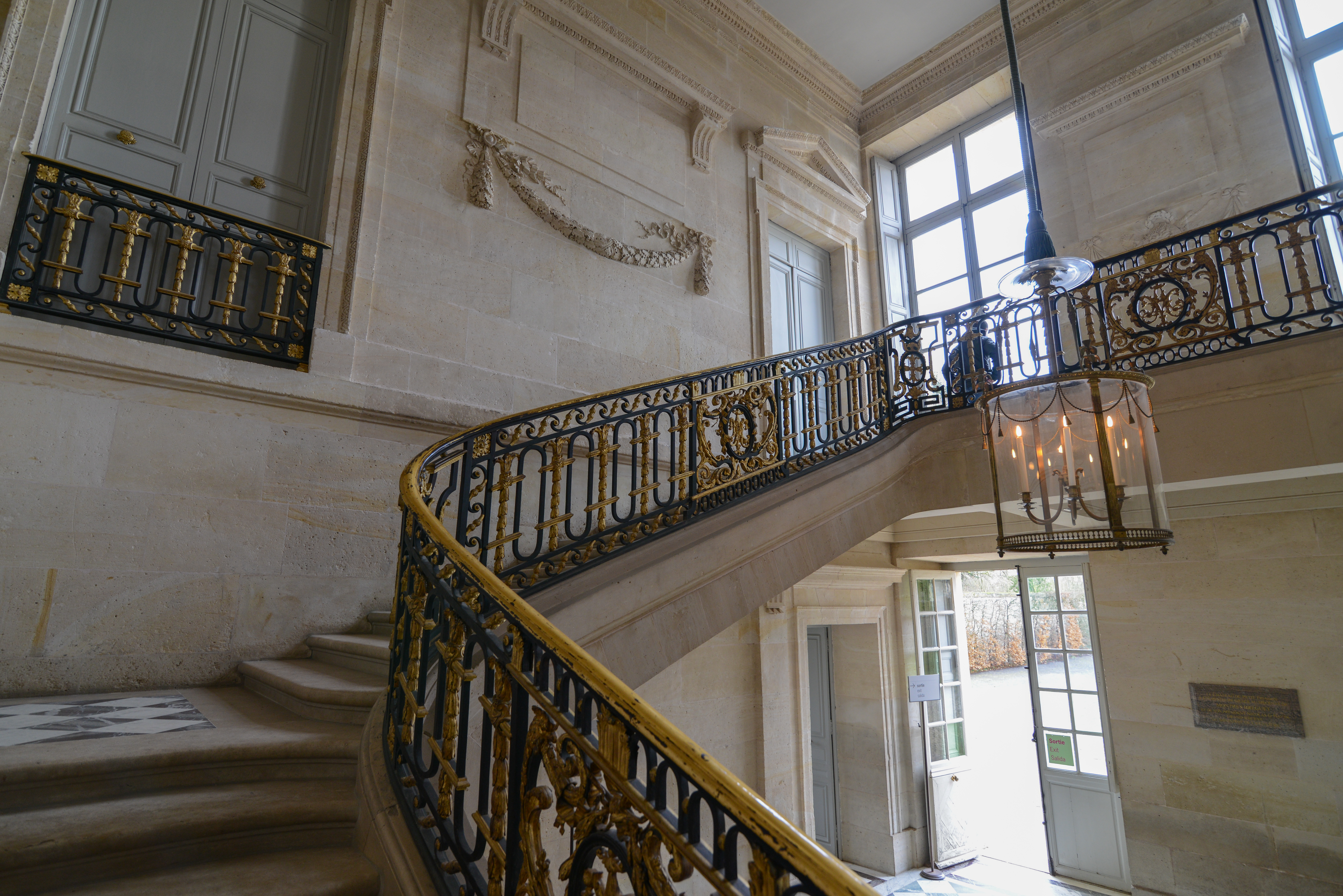
Staircase of the Petit Trianon, by Ange-Jacques Gabriel, 1764

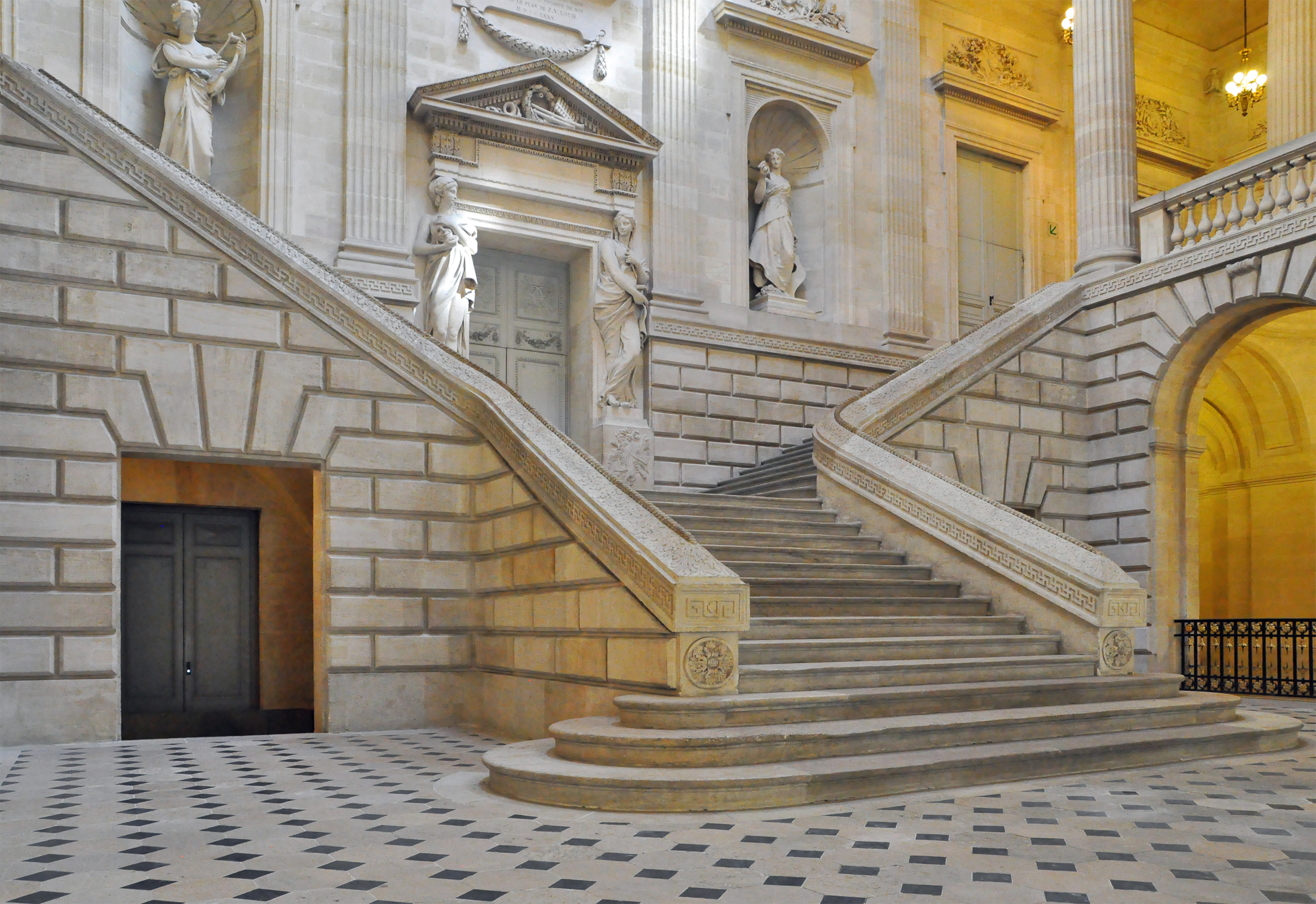
Stairway of the Grand Theater of Bordeaux, Bordeaux, France, by Victor Louis, 1777-1780

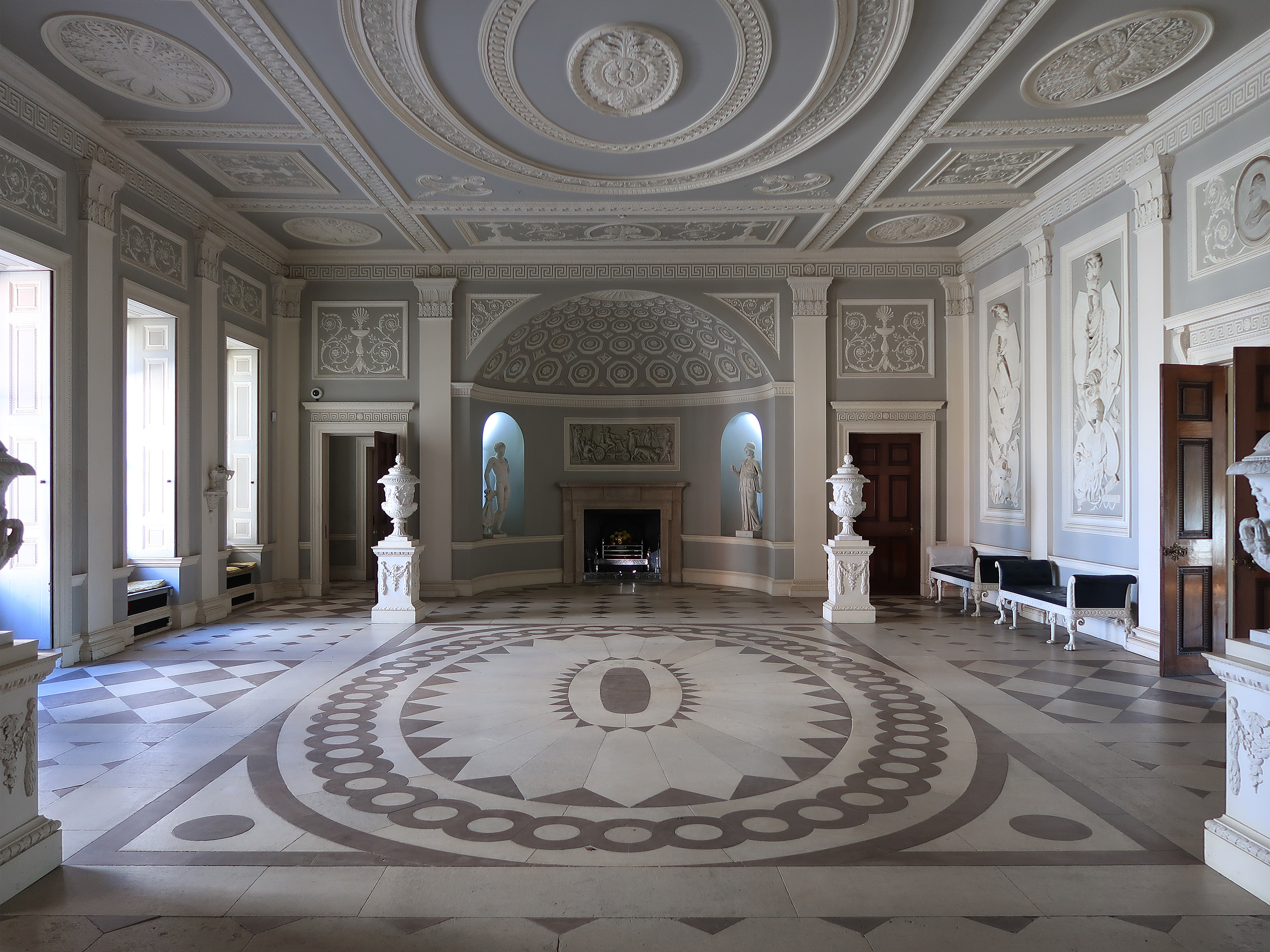
The Hall, Osterley Park, London, by Robert Adam, 1767

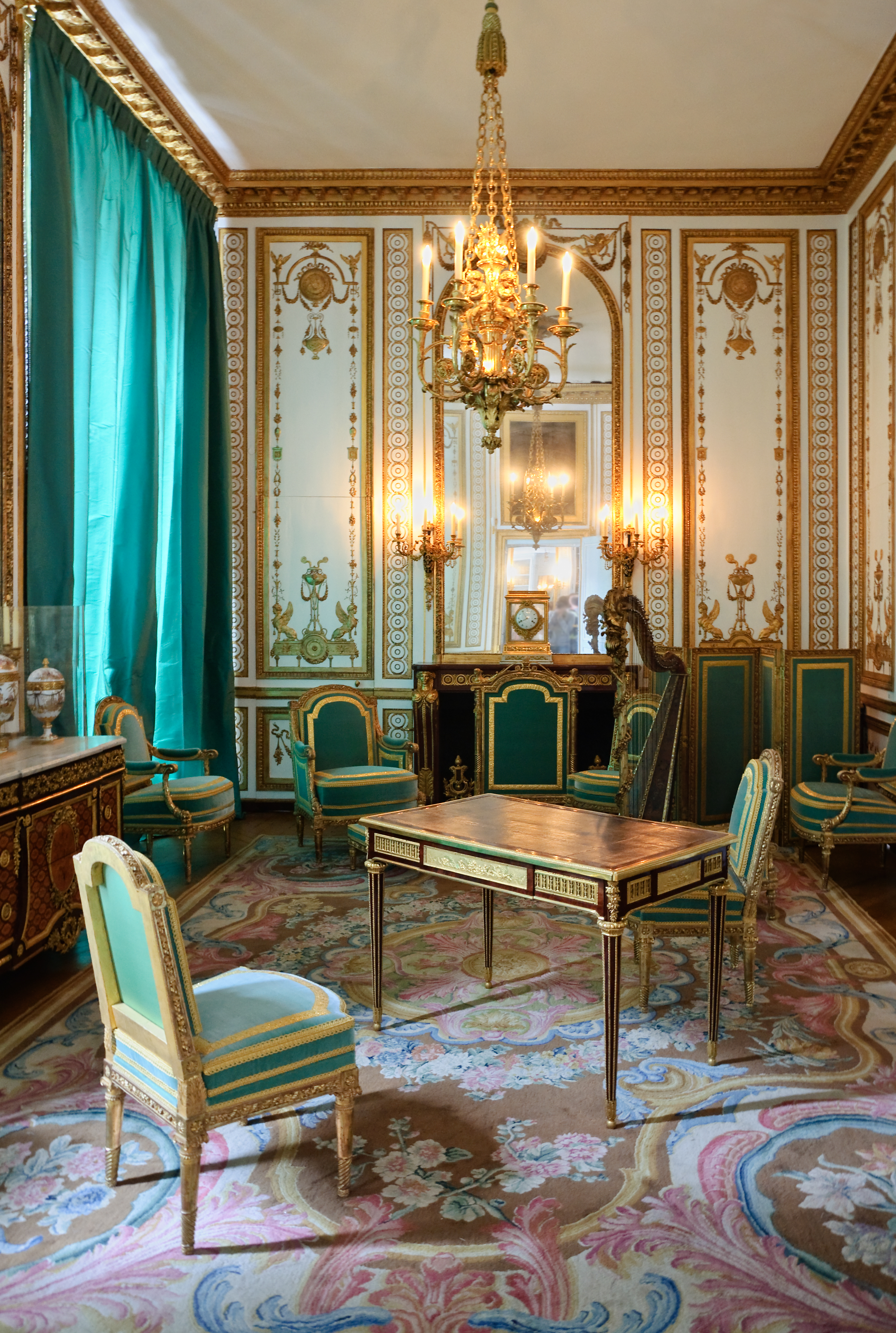
Cabinet Doré of Marie-Antoinette in the Palace of Versailles, 1783, by the Rousseau brothers

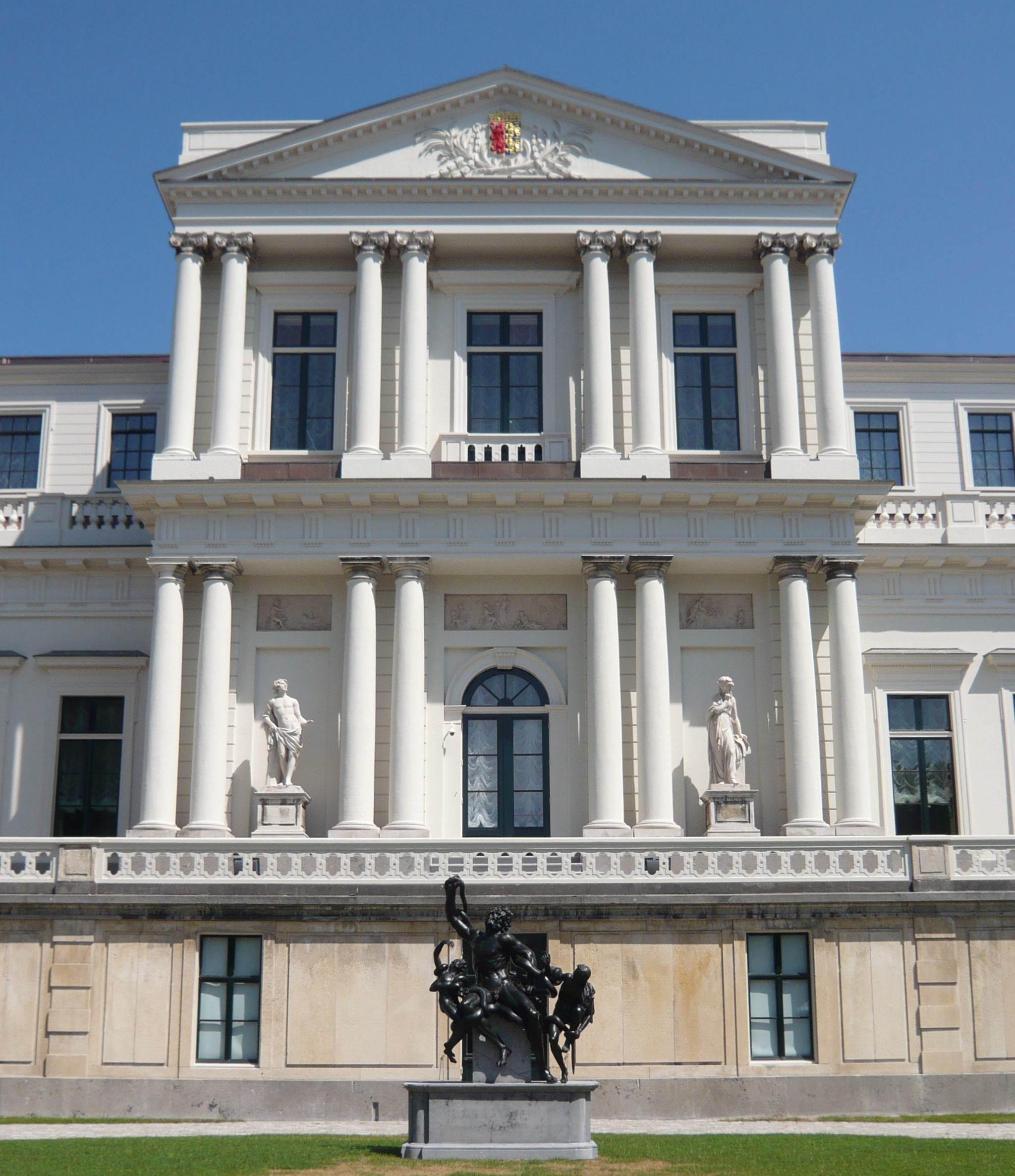
Villa Welgelegen, Haarlem, Netherlands, by Abraham van der Hart, 1789

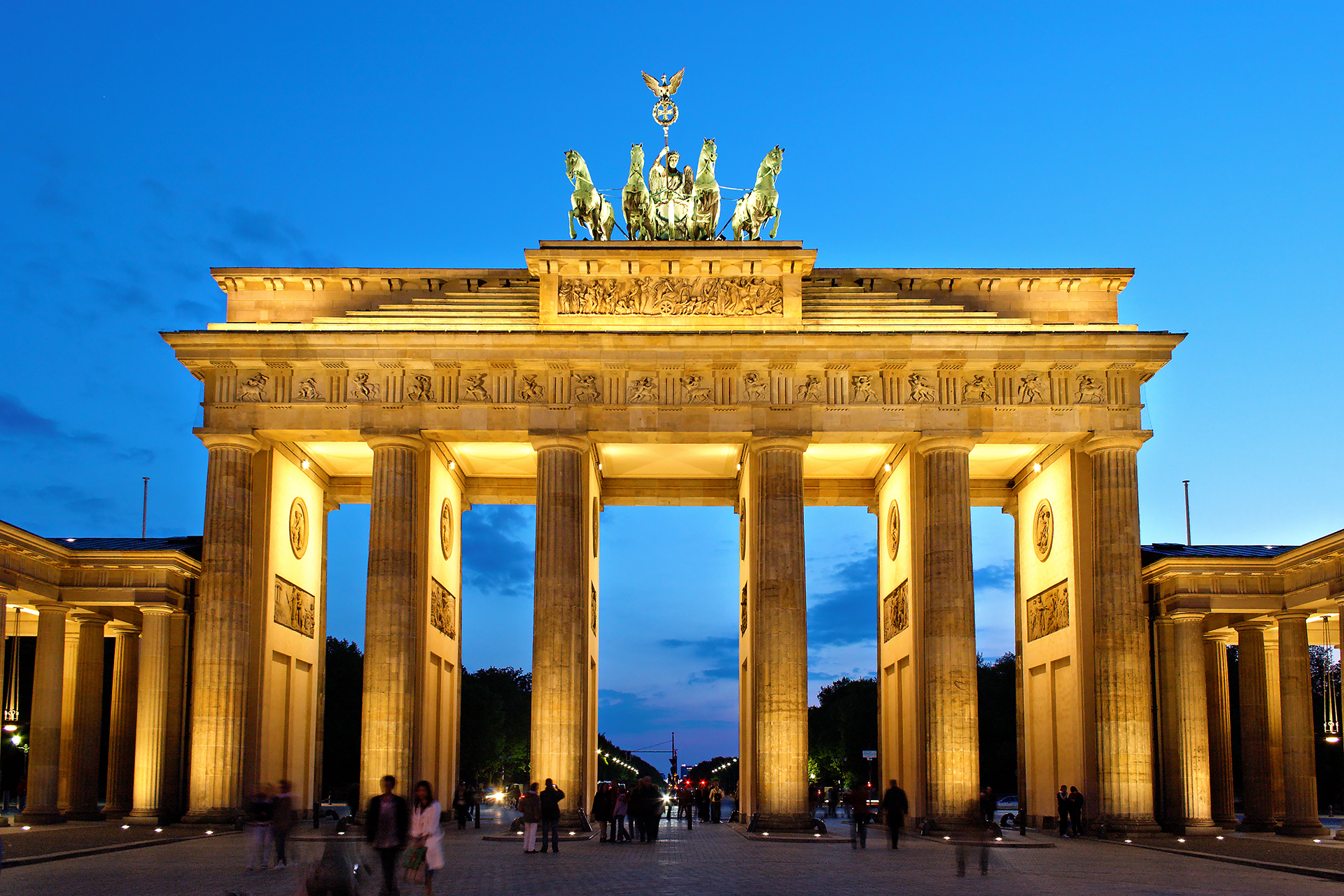
Brandenburg Gate, in Berlin, Germany, by Carl Gotthard Langhans, 1791

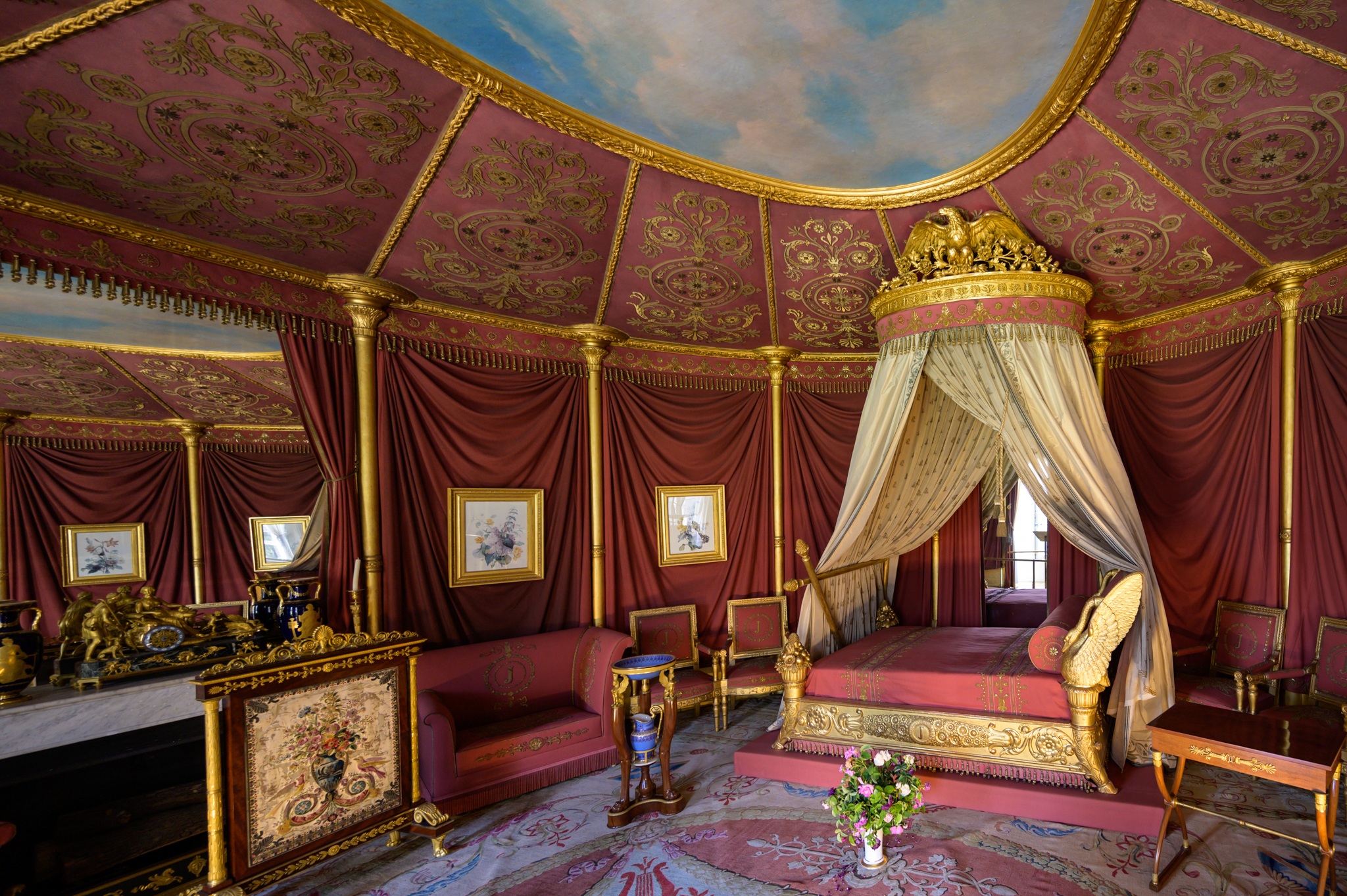
Empress Joséphine's Bedroom in Château de Malmaison, Rueil-Malmaison, France, by Charles Percier and Pierre-François-Léonard Fontaine, 1800-1802

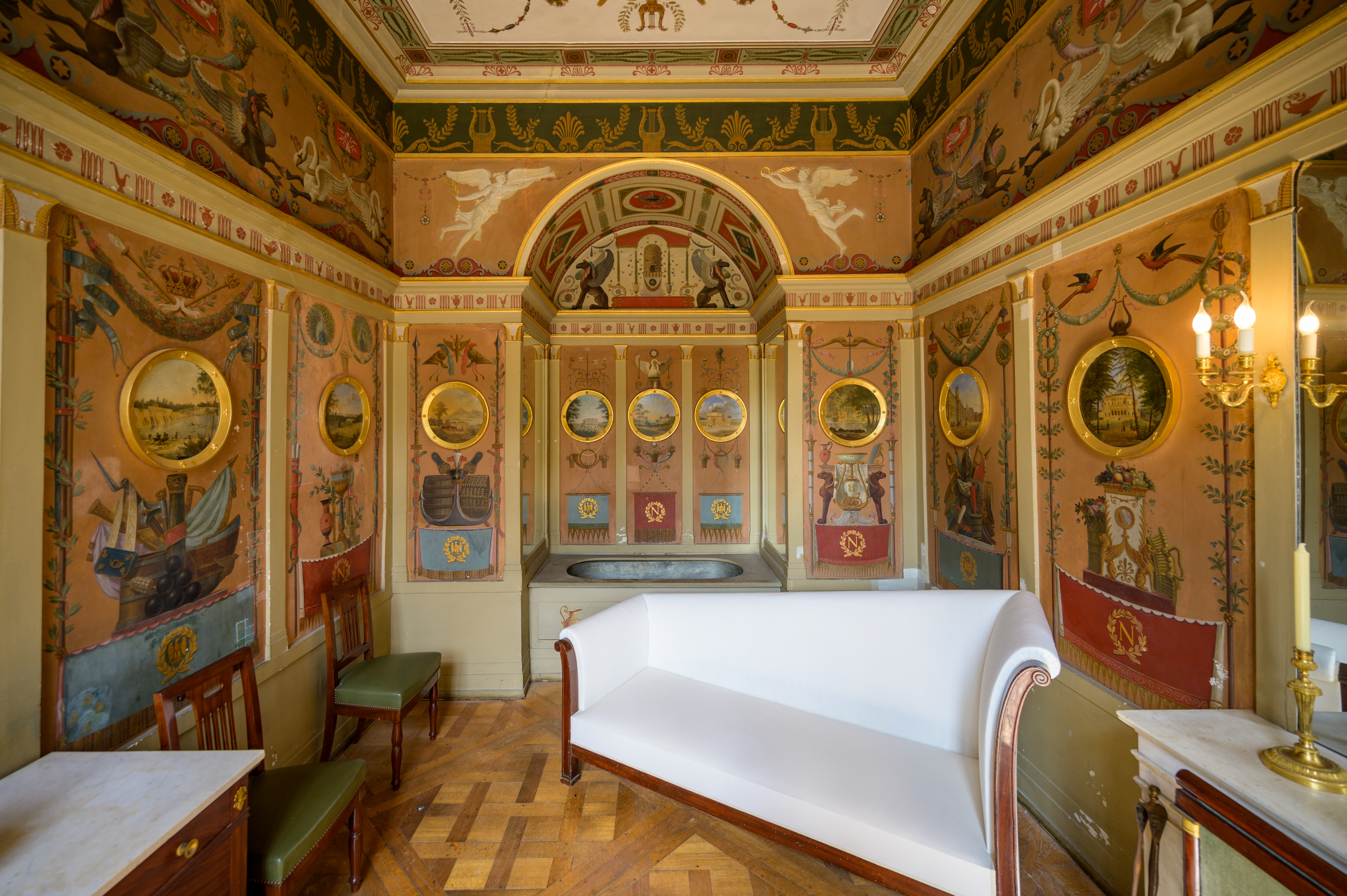
Napoleon's bath of the Château de Rambouillet, Rambouillet, France, painted by Godard and Jean Vasserot, 1806

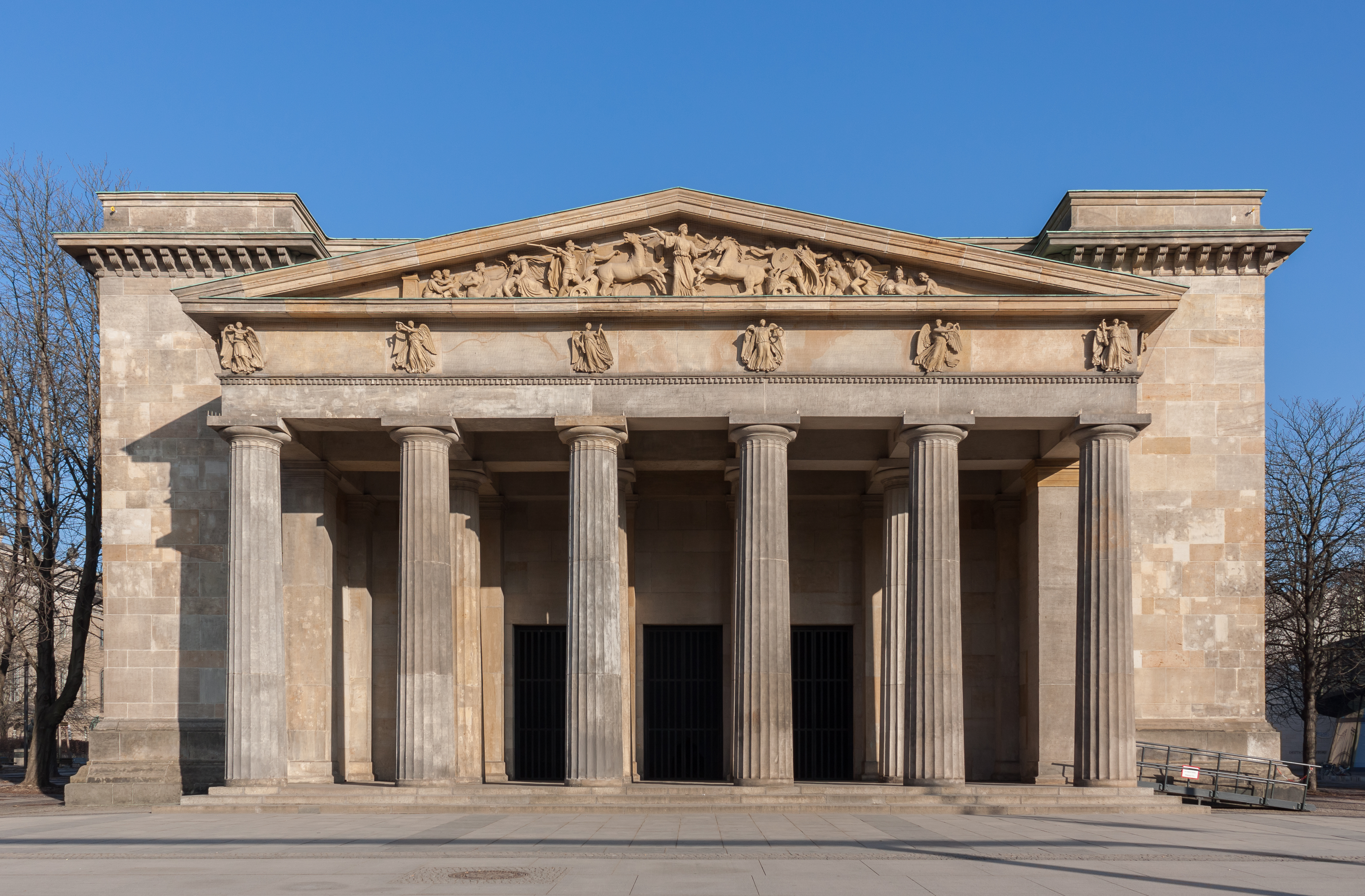
Neue Wache, Berlin, by Karl Friedrich Schinkel and Salomo Sachs, 1816

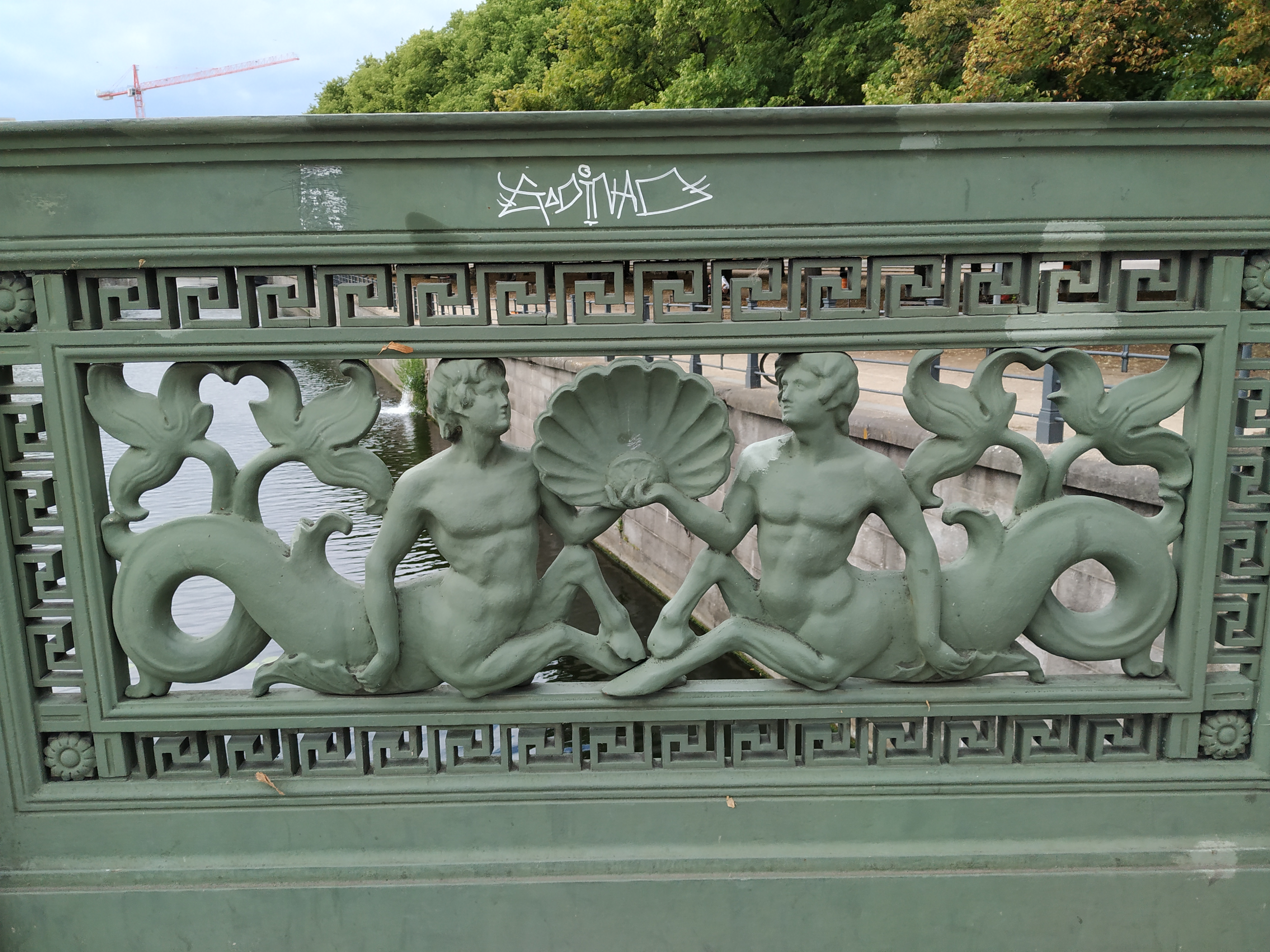
Cast iron railing detail of the Schlossbrücke, Berlin, by Karl Friedrich Schinkel, designed in 1819 and produced in 1824

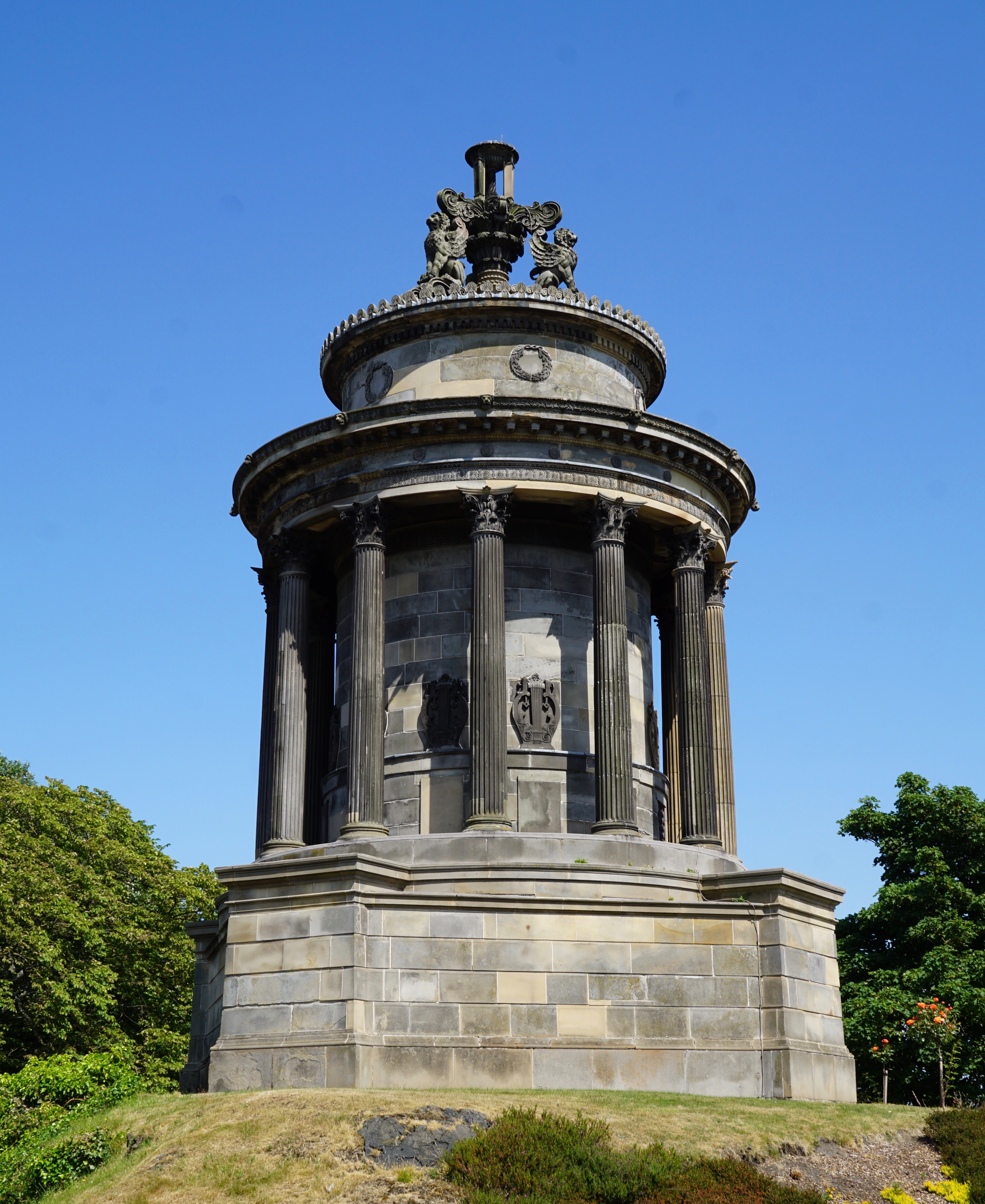
Burns Monument, Edinburgh, UK, by Thomas Hamilton, 1820-1831

Neoclassical architecture focused on Ancient Greek and Roman details, plain, white walls and grandeur of scale. Compared to the previous styles, Baroque and Rococo, Neoclassical exteriors tended to be more minimalist, featuring straight and angular lines, but being still ornamented. The style's clean lines and sense of balance and proportion worked well for grand buildings (such as the Panthéon in Paris) and for smaller structures alike (such as the Petit Trianon).

Excavations during the 18th century at Pompeii and Herculaneum, which had both been buried under volcanic ash during the 79 AD eruption of Mount Vesuvius, inspired a return to order and rationality, largely thanks to the writings of Johann Joachim Winckelmann. In the mid-18th century, antiquity was upheld as a standard for architecture as never before. Neoclassicism was a fundamental investigation of the very bases of architectural form and meaning. In the 1750s, an alliance between archaeological exploration and architectural theory started, which will continue in the 19th century. Marc-Antoine Laugier wrote in 1753 that 'Architecture owes all that is perfect to the Greeks'.

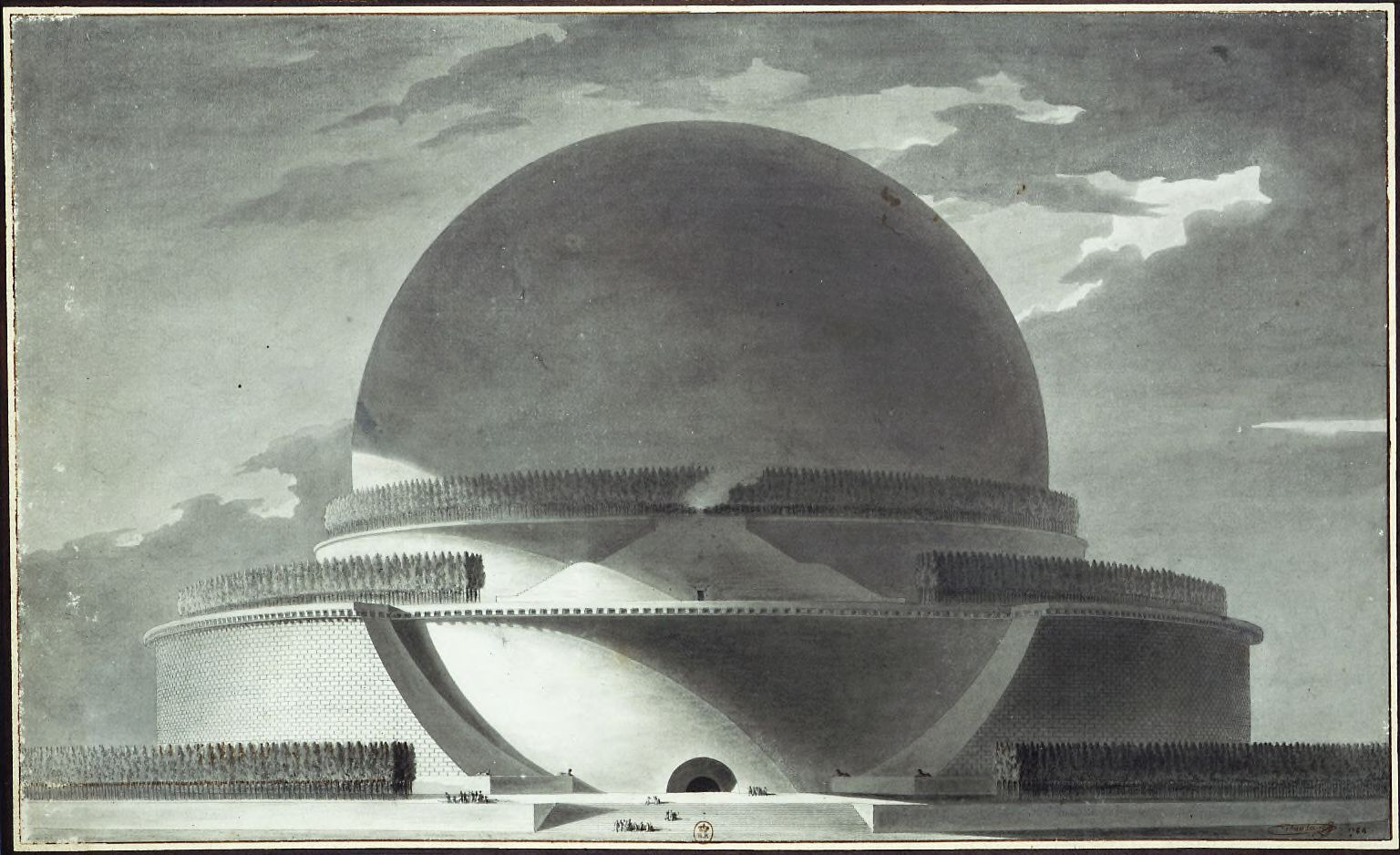
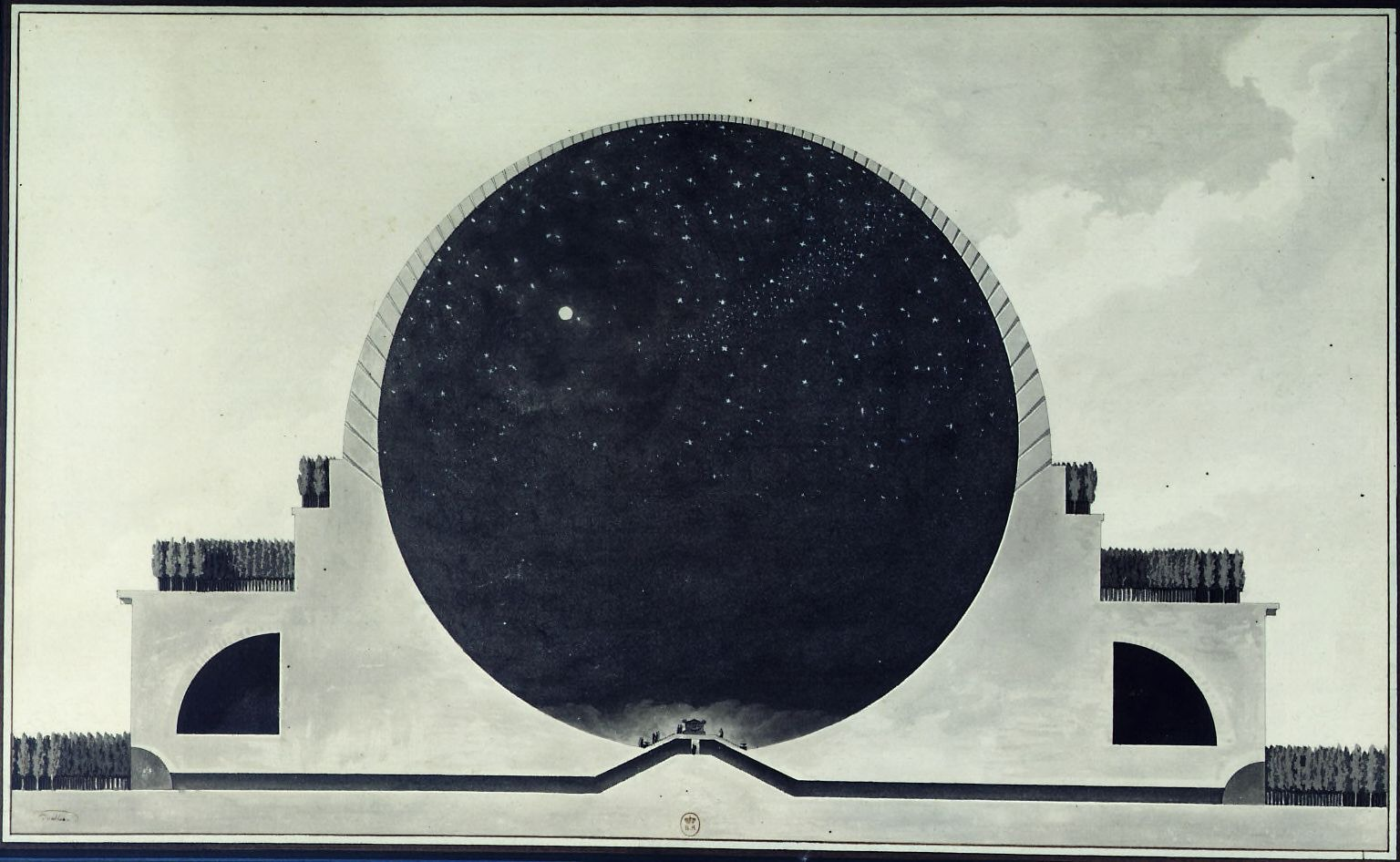
The Cenotaph of Newton, c. 1784 (never built), by Étienne-Louis Boullée

The style was adopted by progressive circles in other countries such as Sweden and Russia. Federal-style architecture is the name for the classicizing architecture built in North America between c. 1780 and 1830, and particularly from 1785 to 1815. This style shares its name with its era, the Federal Period. The term is also used in association with furniture design in the United States of the same time period. The style broadly corresponds to the middle-class classicism of Biedermeier style in the German-speaking lands, Regency style in Britain and to the French Empire style. In Central and Eastern Europe, the style is usually referred to as Classicism (German: Klassizismus, Russian: Классицизм), while the newer Revival styles of the 19th century until today are called neoclassical.

Étienne-Louis Boullée (1728–1799) was a visionary architect of the period. His utopian projects, never built, included a monument to Isaac Newton (1784) in the form of an immense dome, with an oculus allowing the light to enter, giving the impression of a sky full of stars. His project for an enlargement of the Royal Library (1785) was even more dramatic, with a gigantic arch sheltering the collection of books. While none of his projects were ever built, the images were widely published and inspired architects of the period to look outside the traditional forms.

Similarly with the Renaissance and Baroque periods, during the Neoclassical one urban theories of how a good city should be appeared too. Enlightenment writers of the 18th century decried the problems of Paris at that time, the biggest one being the big number of narrow medieval streets crowded with modest houses. Voltaire openly criticized the failure of the French Royal administration to initiate public works, improve the quality of life in towns, and stimulate the economy. 'It is time for those who rule the most opulent capital in Europe to make it the most comfortable and the most magnificent of cities. There must be public markets, fountains which actually provide water and regular pavements. The narrow and infected streets must be widened, monuments that cannot be seen must be revealed and new ones built for all to see', Voltaire insisted in a polemical essay on 'The Embellishments of Paris' in 1749. In the same year, Étienne La Font de Saint-Yenne, criticized how Louis XIV's great east façade of the Louvre, was all but hidden from views by a dense quarter of modest houses. Voltaire also said that in order to transform Paris into a city that could rival ancient Rome, it was necessary to demolish more than it was to build. 'Our towns are still what they were, a mass of houses crowded together haphazardly without system, planning or design', Marc-Antoine Laugier complained in 1753. Writing a decade later, Pierre Patte promoted an urban reform in quest of health, social order, and security, launching at the same time a medical and organic metaphor which compared the operations of urban design to those of the surgeons. With bad air and lack of fresh water its current state was pathological, Patte asserted, calling for fountains to be placed at principal intersections and markets. Squares are recommended promote the circulation of air, and for the same reason houses on the city's bridges should be demolished. He also criticized the location of hospitals next to markets and protested continued burials in overcrowded city churchyards. Besides cities, new ideas of how a garden should be appeared in 18th century England, making place for the English landscape garden (aka jardin à l'anglaise), characterized by an idealized view of nature, and the use of Greco-Roman or Gothic ruins, bridges, and other picturesque architecture, designed to recreate an idyllic pastoral landscape. It was the opposite of the symmetrical and geometrically planned Baroque garden (aka jardin à la française).

=== Revivalism and Eclecticism ===
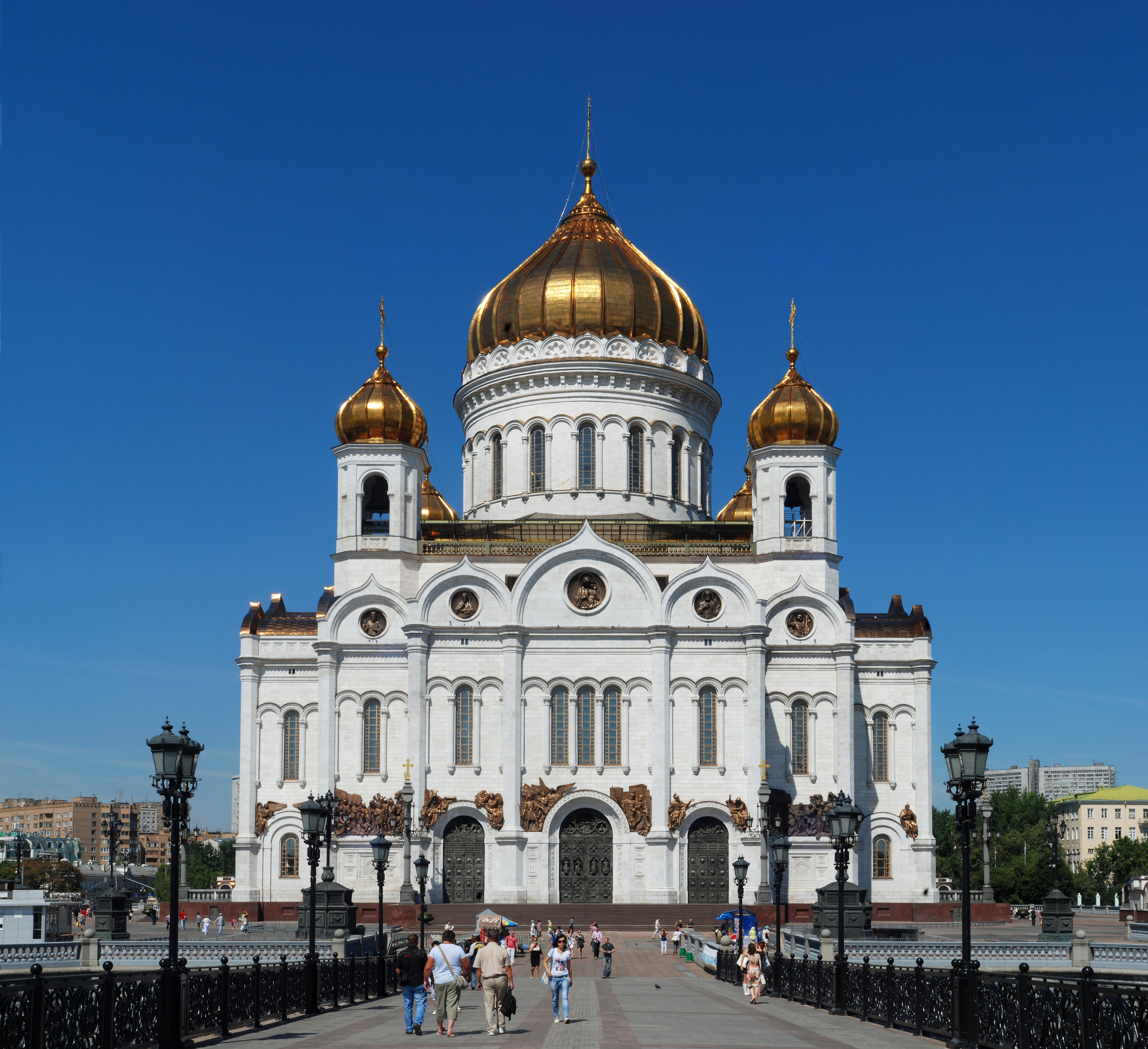
Russian Revival - Cathedral of Christ the Saviour, Moscow, Russia, 1839–1860, destroyed in 1931 and rebuilt in 1995–2000

Gothic Revival - Interior of the All Saints, London, by William Butterfield, 1850–1859

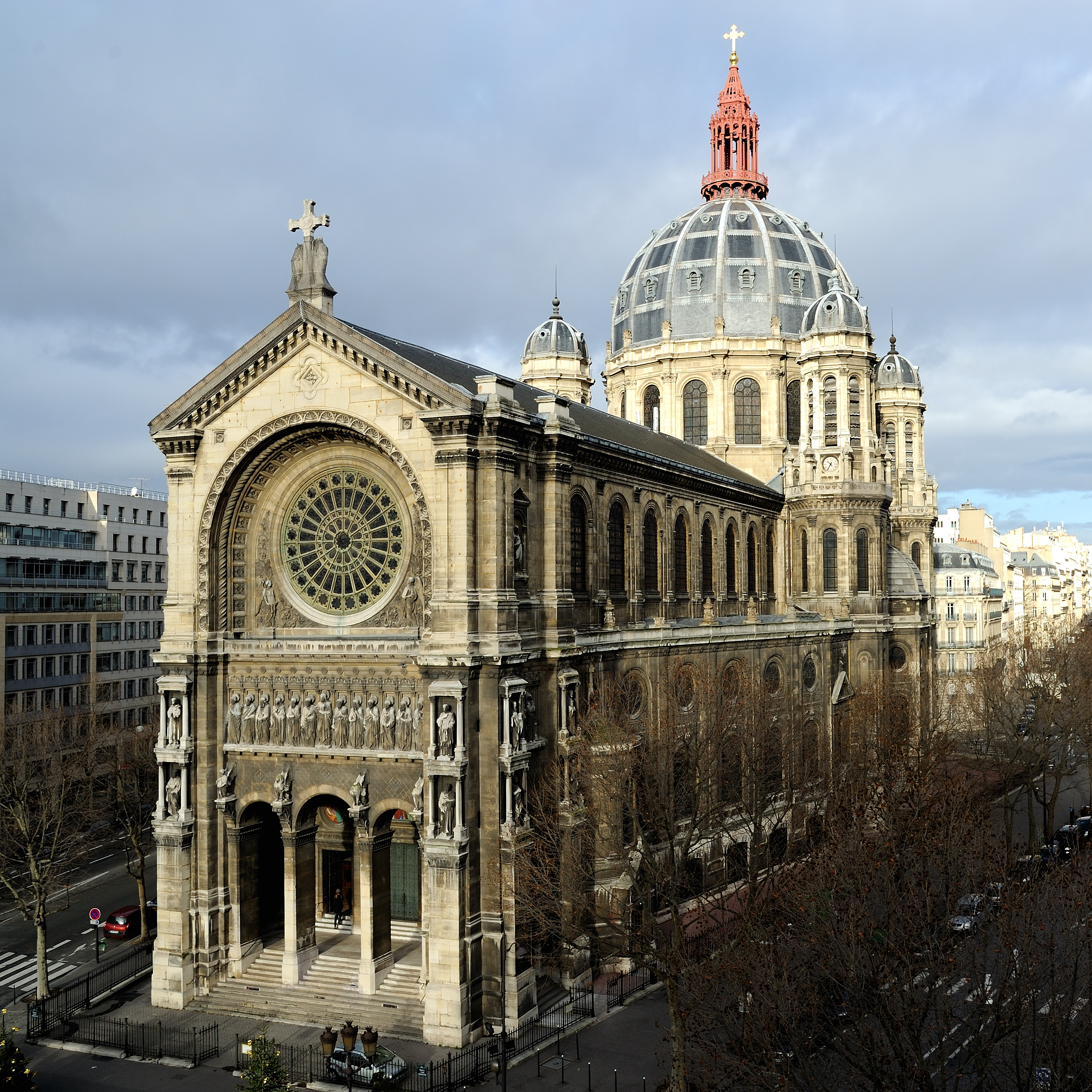
Eclectic - The Église Saint-Augustin de Paris, by Victor Baltard, 1860–1868

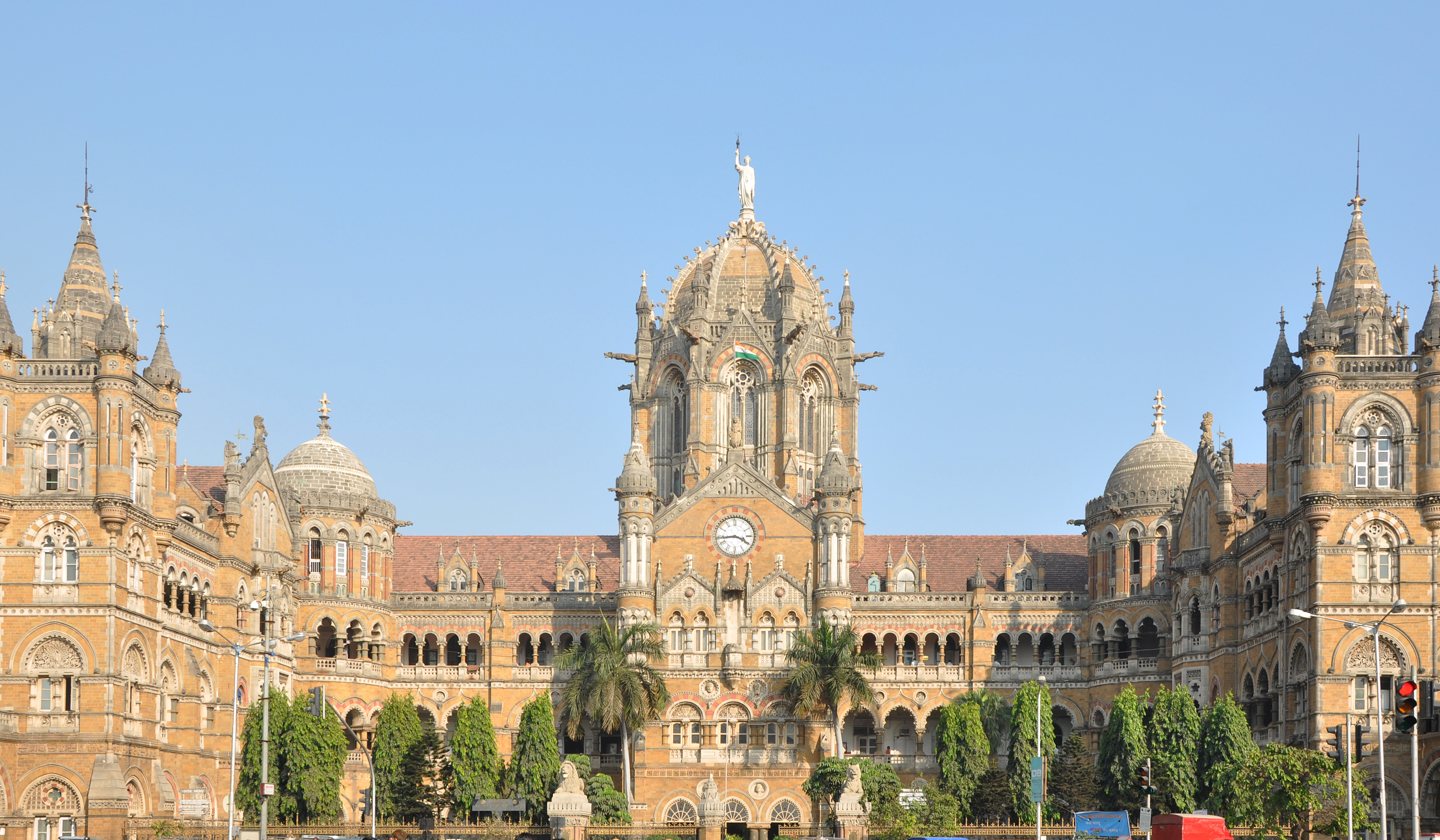
Indo-Saracenic - The Chhatrapati Shivaji Maharaj Terminus, previously Victoria Terminus, a mixture of Romanesque, Gothic and Mughal elements Mumbai, Maharashtra, by Frederick William Stevens 1878–1888

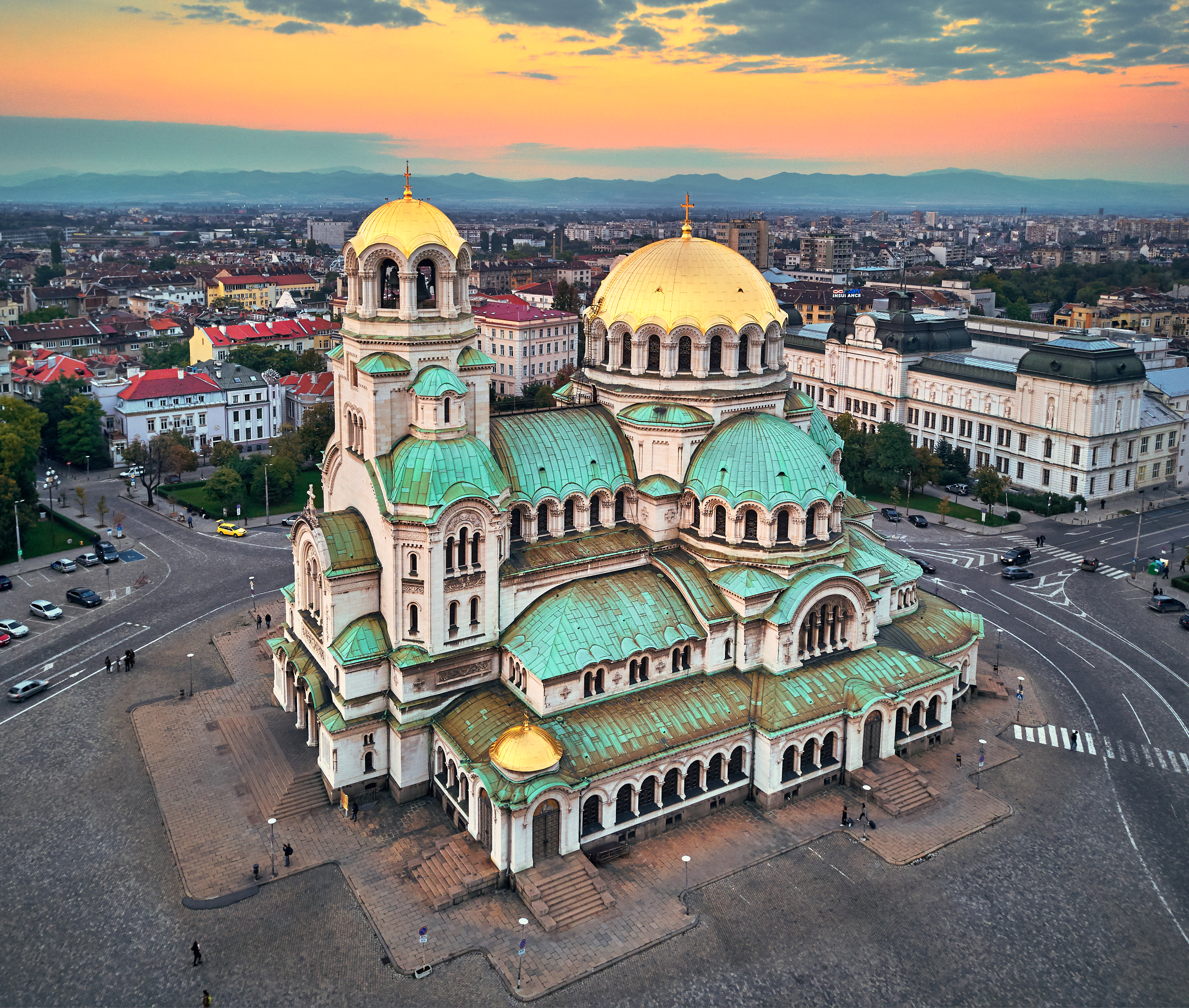
Byzantine Revival - Alexander Nevsky Cathedral, Sofia, Bulgaria, by Alexander Pomerantsev, 1882–1912

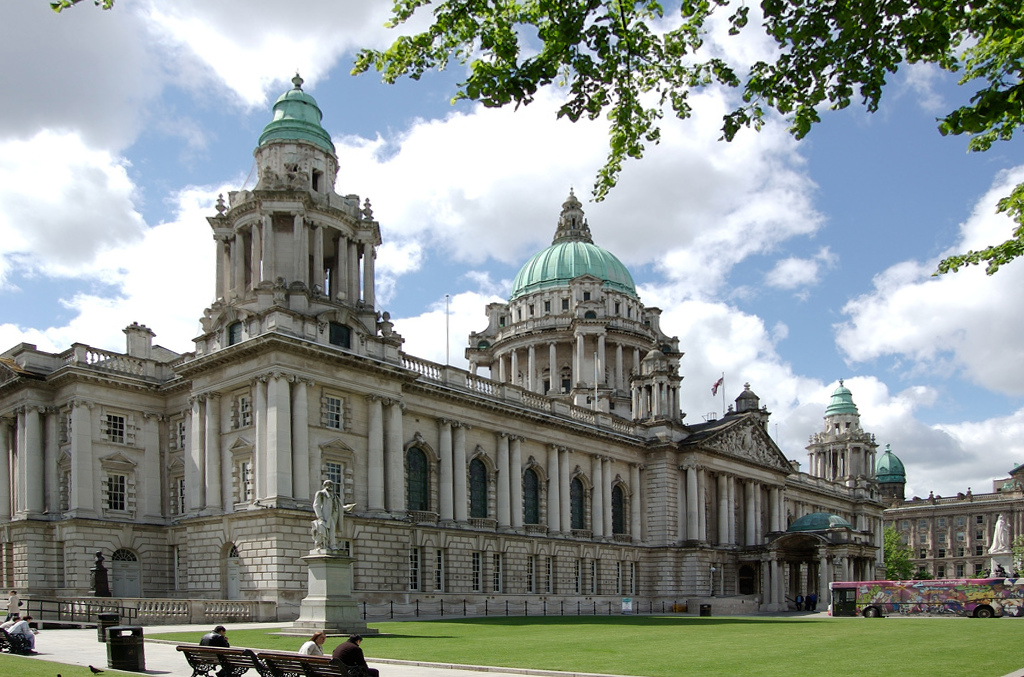
Neo-Baroque - Belfast City Hall, Belfast, UK, by Brumwell Thomas, 1898–1906

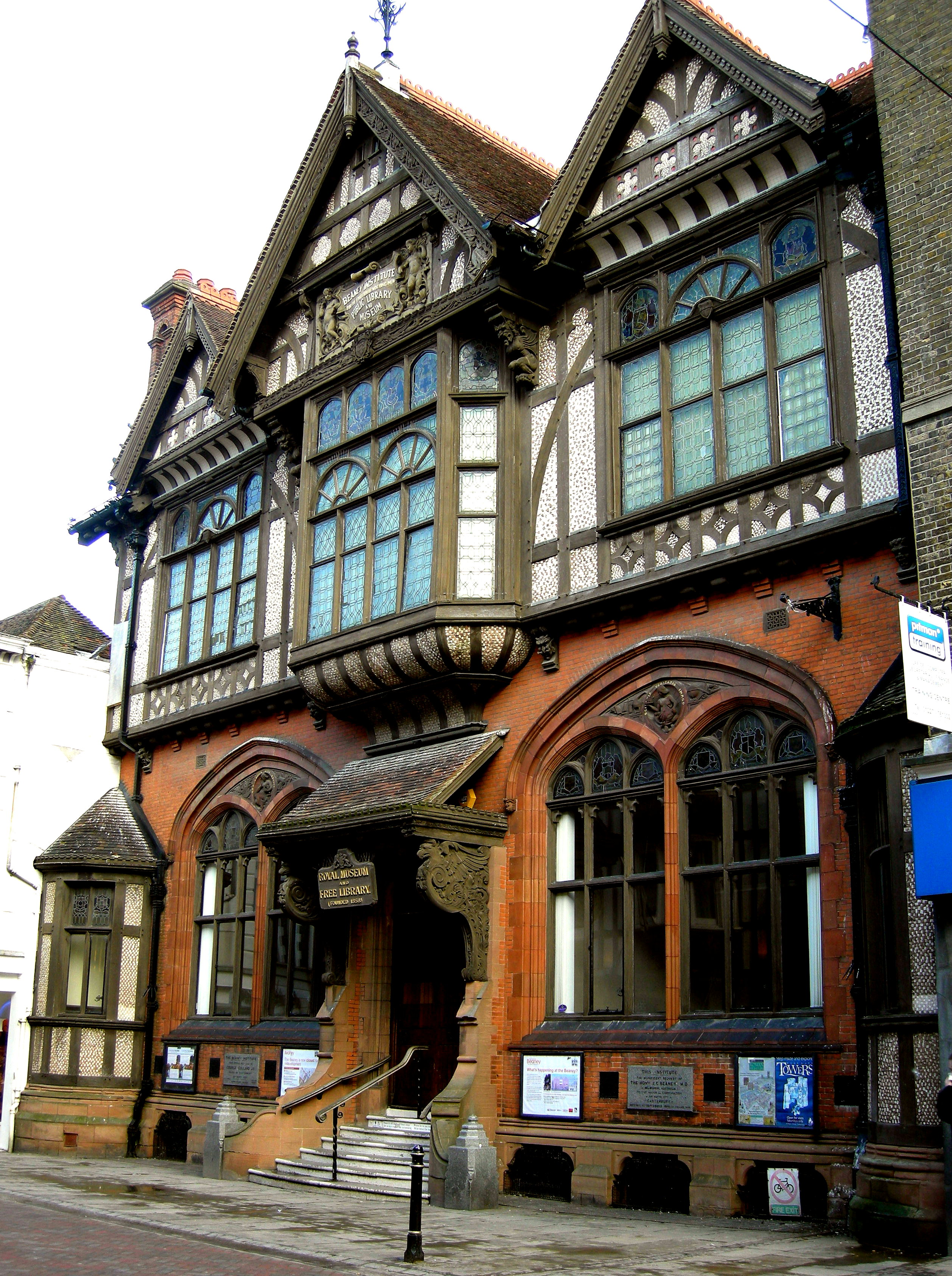
Tudor Revival architecture - The Beaney House of Art and Knowledge, Canterbury, England, by A.H. Campbell, 1899

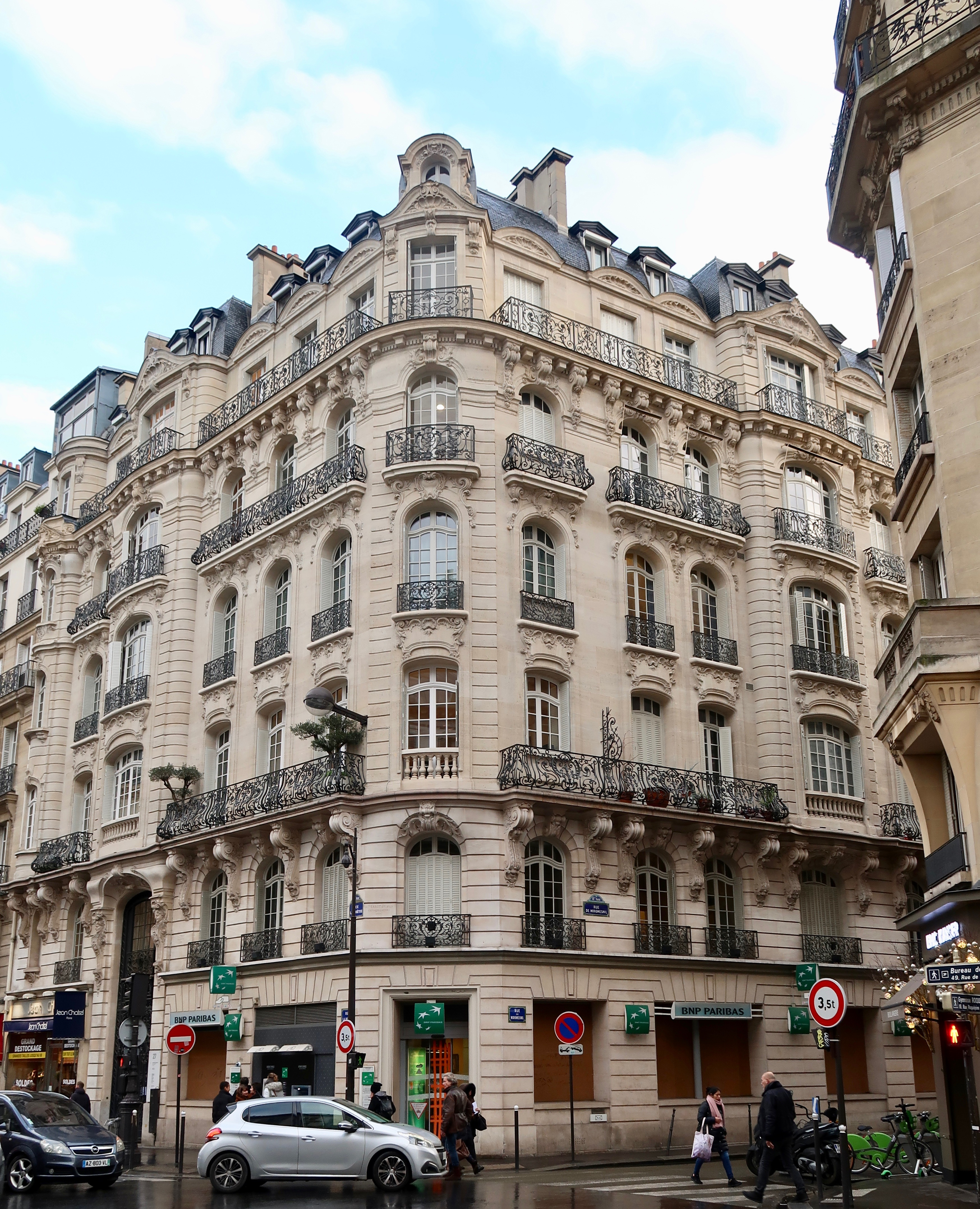
Rococo Revival - Apartment building no. 8 on Rue de Miromesnil, Paris, by P. Lobrot, 1900

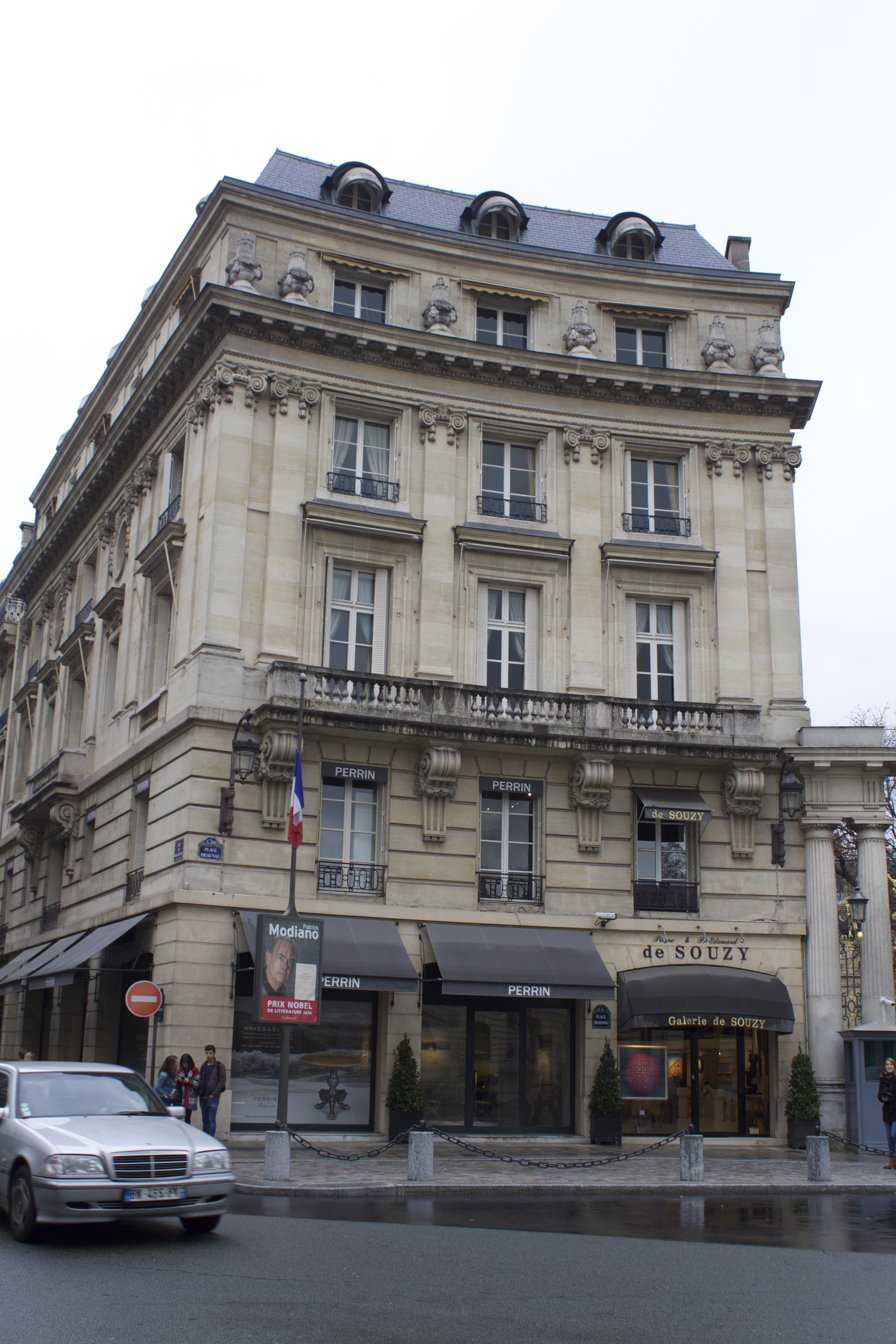
Louis XVI Revival - Apartment building no. 2 on Rue de Miromesnil, Paris, unknown architect, c.1900

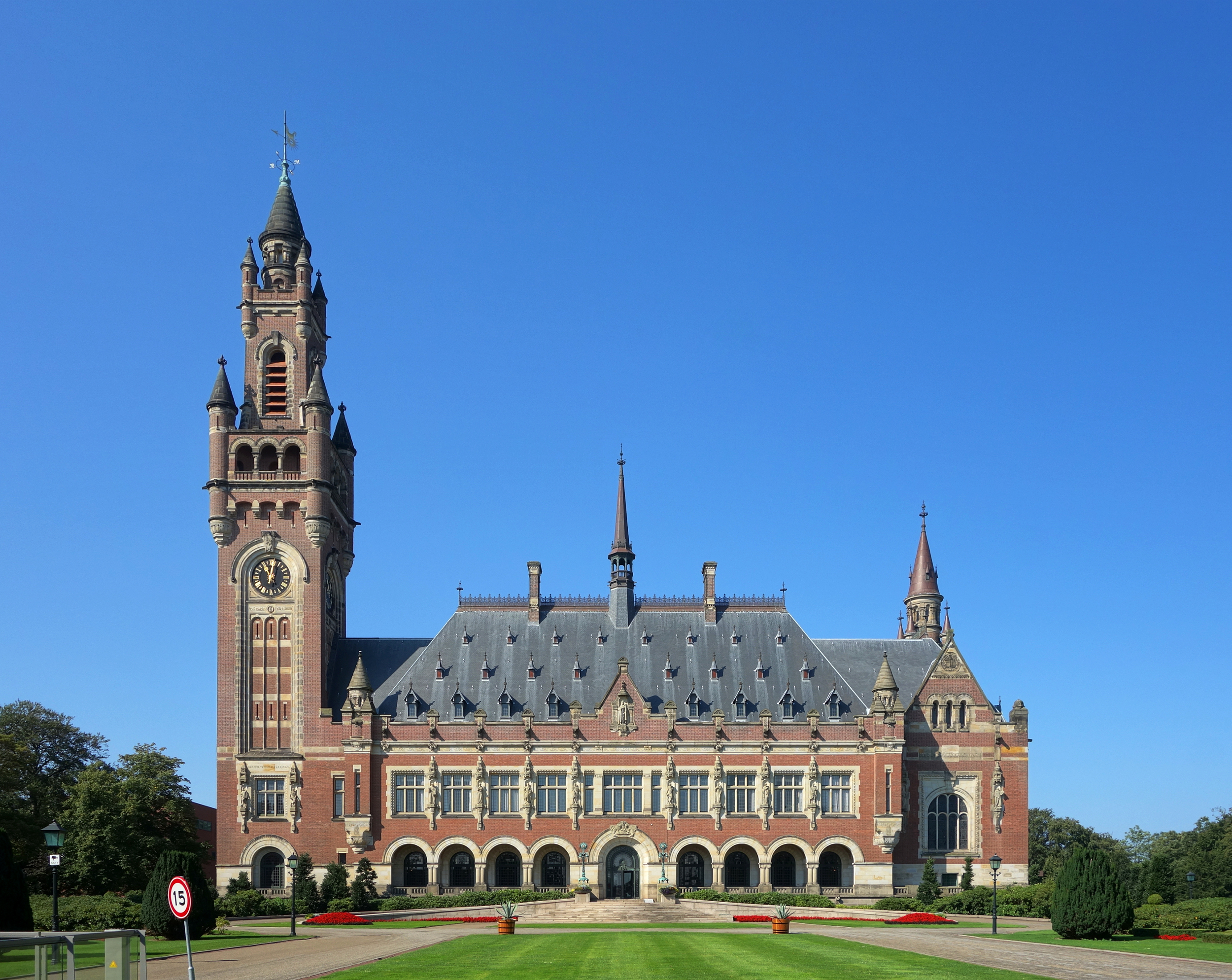
Renaissance Revival - Peace Palace, The Hague, Netherlands, by Louis Marie Cordonnier, 1907

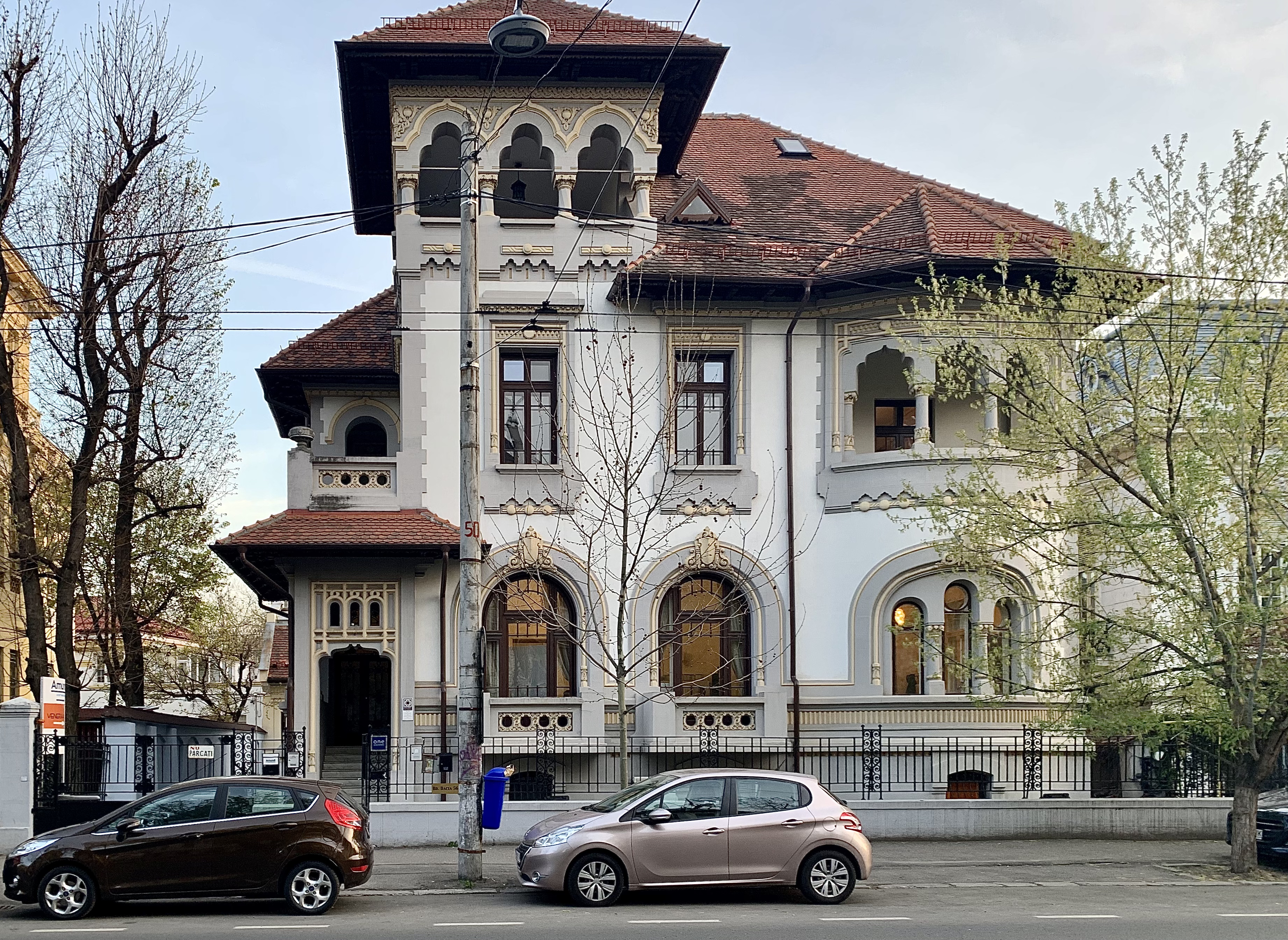
Romanian Revival - The C.N. Câmpeanu House on Bulevardul Dacia, Bucharest, Romania, c. 1923, by Constantin Nănescu

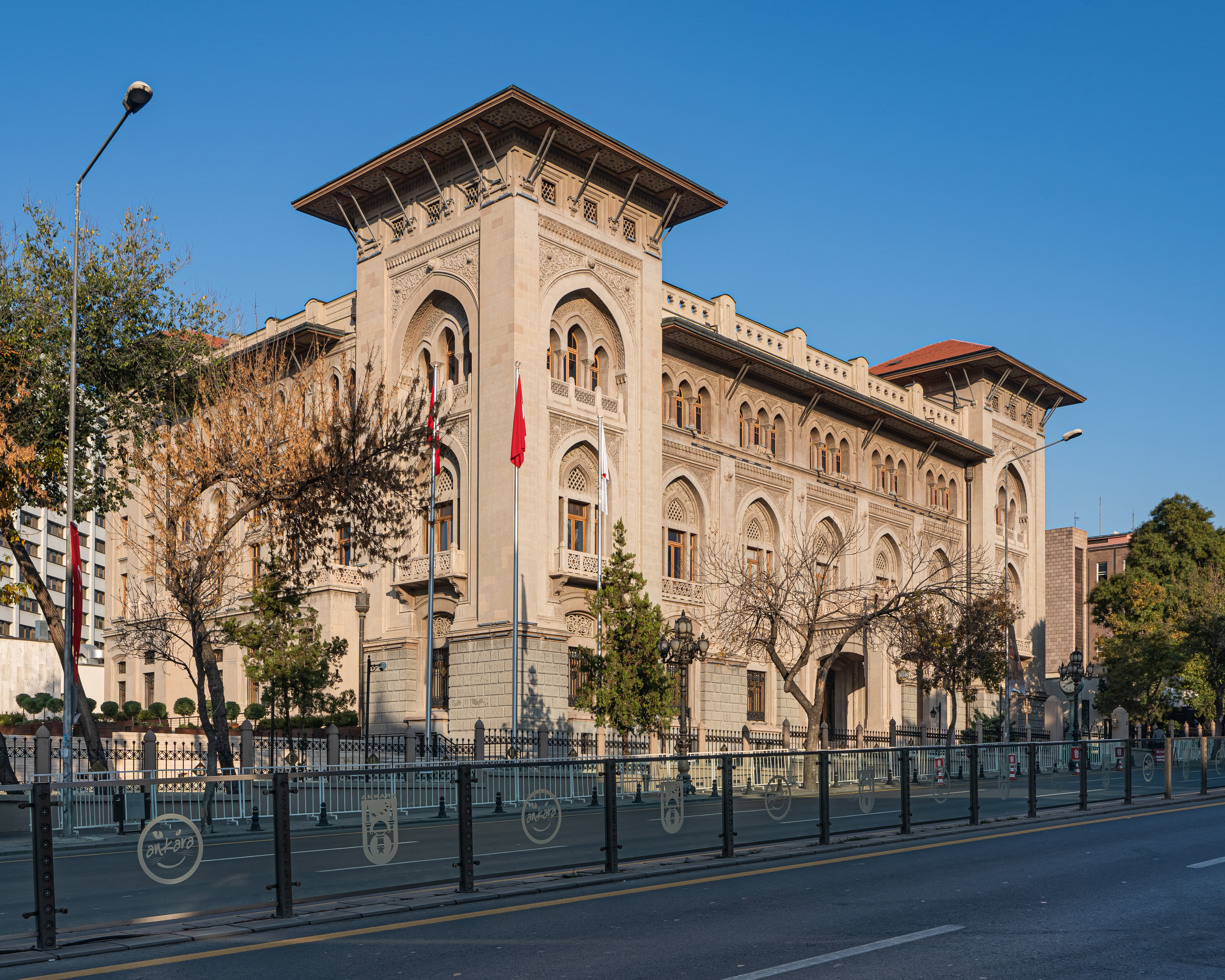
First national movement - Ziraat Bank Museum, Ankara, Turkey, 1929, by Giulio Mongeri

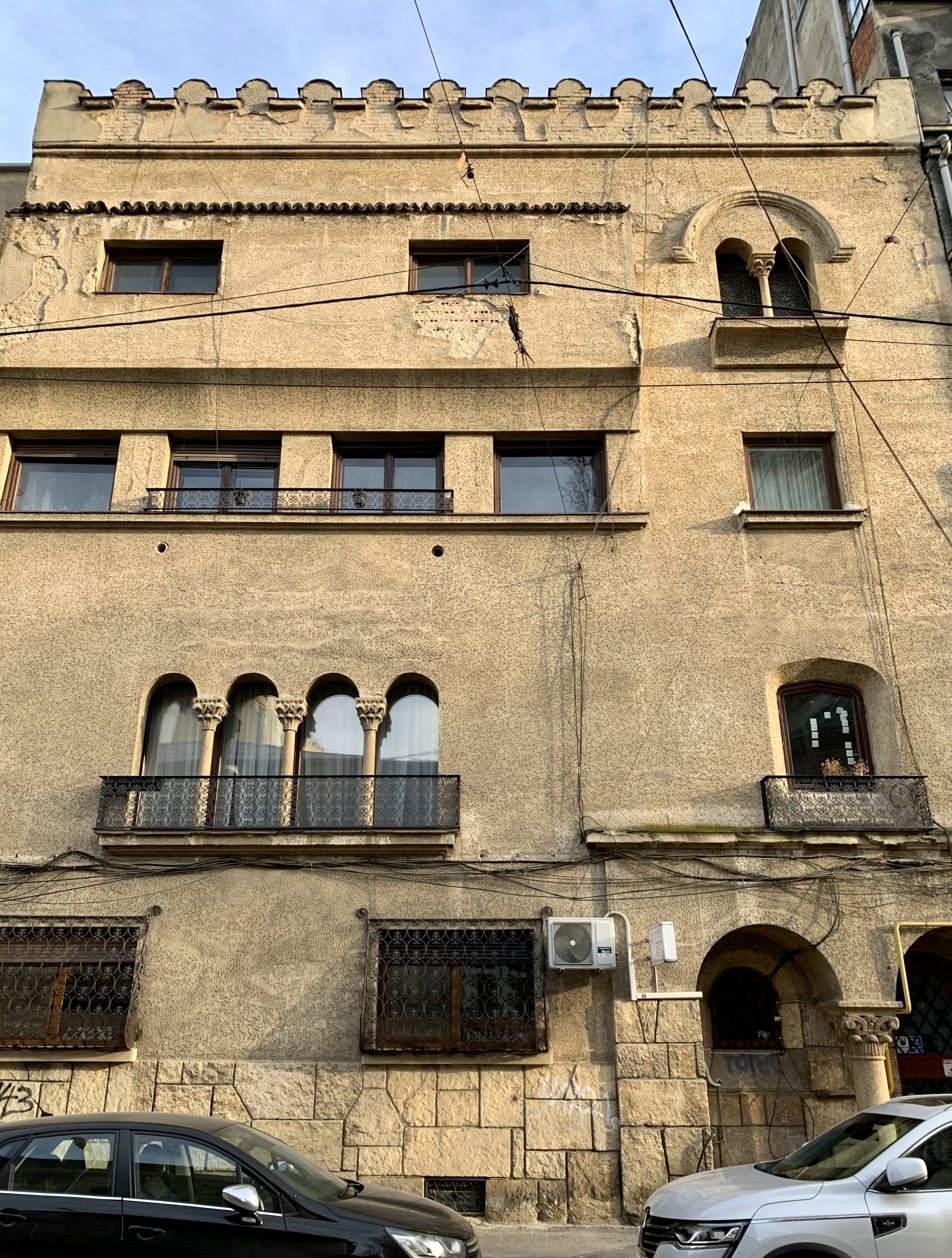
Mediterranean Revival - General Mandiros Ciomac and Simion Ciomac Building (Strada Armenească no. 12), Bucharest, by Ion Giurgea, 1938

The 19th century was dominated by a wide variety of stylistic revivals, variations, and interpretations. Revivalism in architecture is the use of visual styles that consciously echo the style of a previous architectural era. Modern-day Revival styles can be summarized within New Classical architecture, and sometimes under the umbrella term traditional architecture.

The idea that architecture might represent the glory of kingdoms can be traced to the dawn of civilisation, but the notion that architecture can bear the stamp of national character is a modern idea, that appeared in the 18th century historical thinking and given political currency in the wake of the French Revolution. As the map of Europe was repeatedly changing, architecture was used to grant the aura of a glorious past to even the most recent nations. In addition to the credo of universal Classicism, two new, and often contradictory, attitudes on historical styles existed in the early 19th century. Pluralism promoted the simultaneous use of the expanded range of style, while Revivalism held that a single historical model was appropriate for modern architecture. Associations between styles and building types appeared, for example: Egyptian for prisons, Gothic for churches, or Renaissance Revival for banks and exchanges. These choices were the result of other associations: the pharaohs with death and eternity, the Middle Ages with Christianity, or the Medici family with the rise of banking and modern commerce.

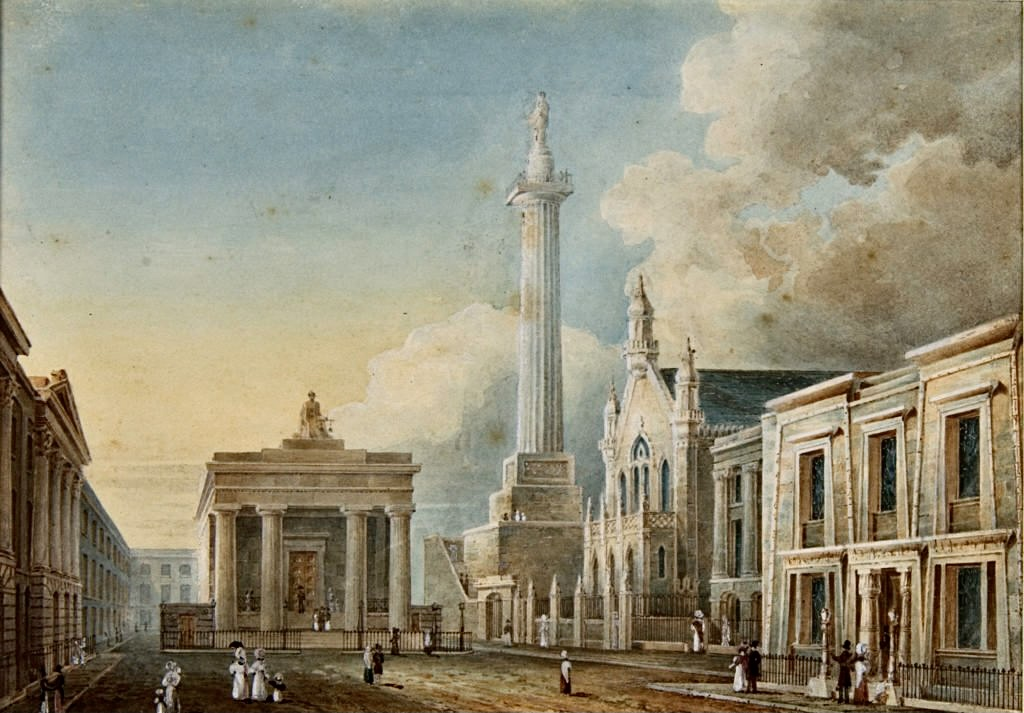
View of Devonpart, near Plymouth (UK), by John Foulston, 1820s, including an 'Egyptian' library, a 'Hindoo' nonconformist chapel, a 'primitive Doric' town hall, and a street of houses with a Roman Corinthian order

Whether their choice was Classical, medieval, or Renaissance, all revivalists shared the strategy of advocating a particular style based on national history, one of the great enterprises of historians in the early 19th century. Only one historic period was claimed to be the only one capable of providing models grounded in national traditions, institutions, or values. Issues of style became matters of state.

The most well-known Revivalist style is the Gothic Revival one, that appeared in the mid-18th century in the houses of a number of wealthy antiquarians in England, a notable example being the Strawberry Hill House. German Romantic writers and architects were the first to promote Gothic as a powerful expression of national character, and in turn use it as a symbol of national identity in territories still divided. Johann Gottfried Herder posed the question 'Why should we always imitate foreigners, as if we were Greeks or Romans?'.

In art and architecture history, the term Orientalism refers to the works of the Western artists who specialized in Oriental subjects, produced from their travels in Western Asia, during the 19th century. In that time, artists and scholars were described as Orientalists, especially in France.

In India, during the British Raj, a new style, Indo-Saracenic, (also known as Indo-Gothic, Mughal-Gothic, Neo-Mughal, or Hindoo style) was getting developed, which incorporated varying degrees of Indian elements into the Western European style. The Churches and convents of Goa are another example of the blending of traditional Indian styles with western European architectural styles. Most Indo-Saracenic public buildings were constructed between 1858 and 1947, with the peaking at 1880. The style has been described as "part of a 19th-century movement to project themselves as the natural successors of the Mughals". They were often built for modern functions such as transport stations, government offices, and law courts. It is much more evident in British power centres in the subcontinent like Mumbai, Chennai, and Kolkata.

=== Beaux-Arts ===
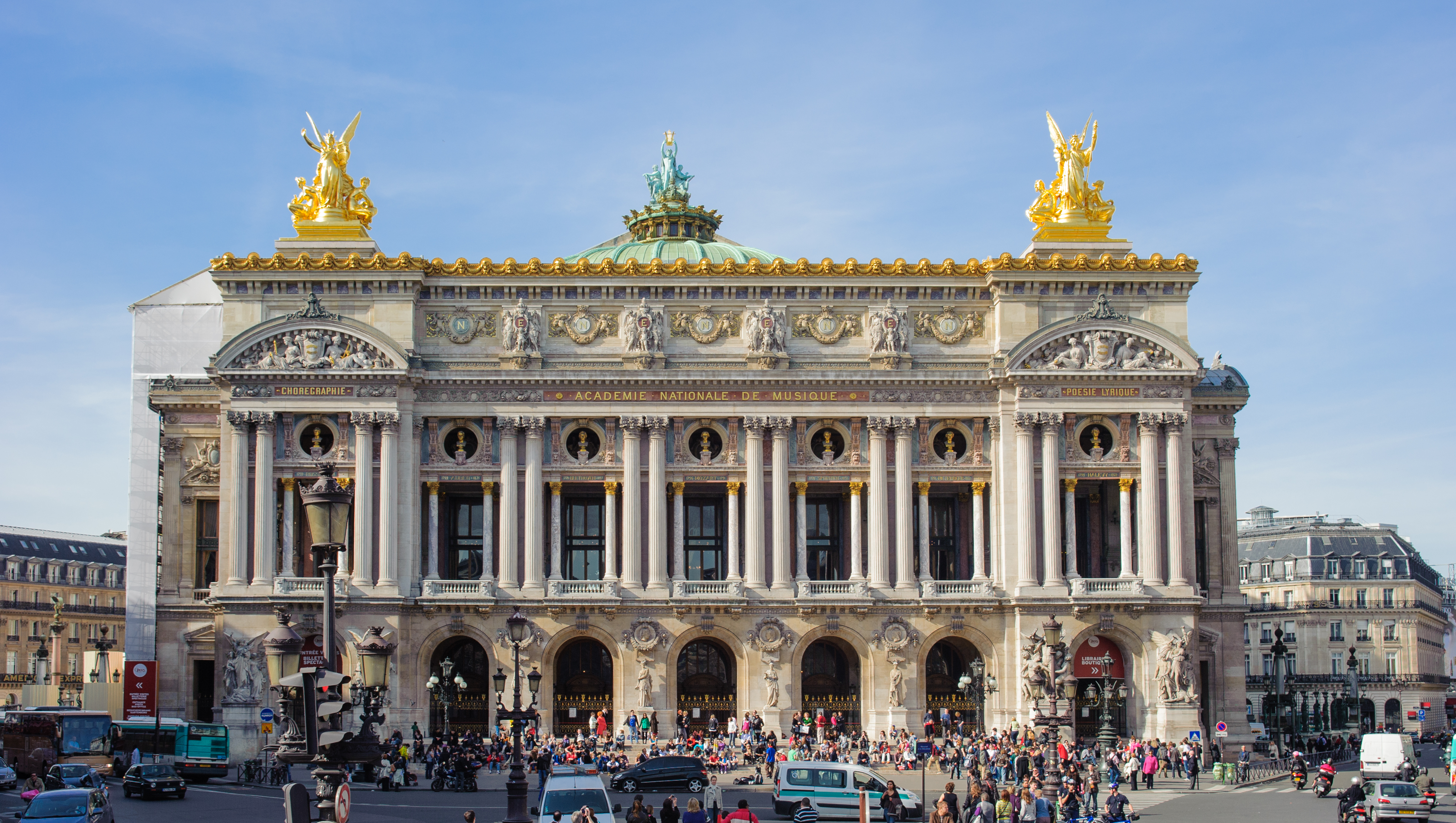
Exterior of the Palais Garnier, Paris, by Charles Garnier, 1860–1875

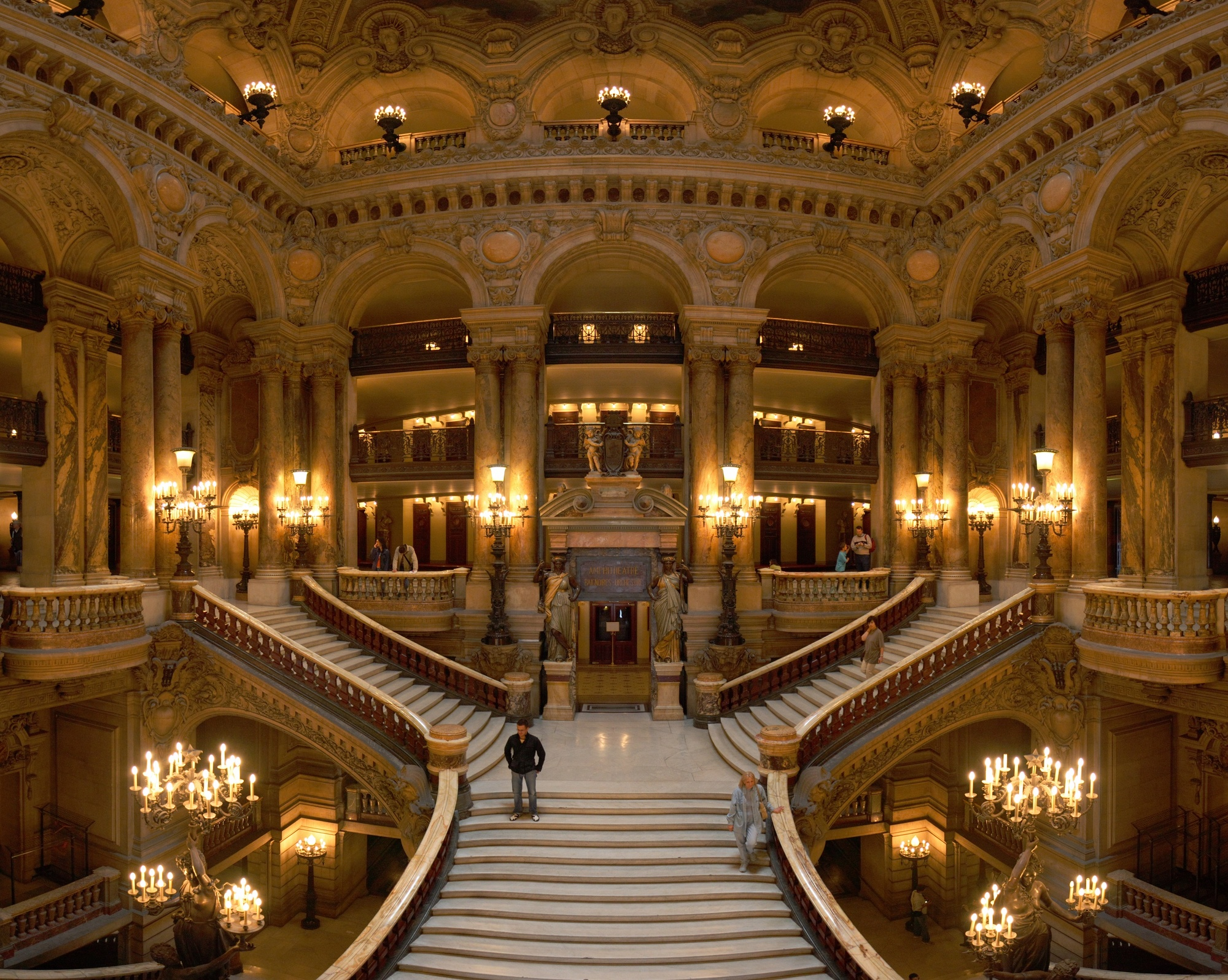
Grand stairs of the Palais Garnier, by Charles Garnier, 1860–1875

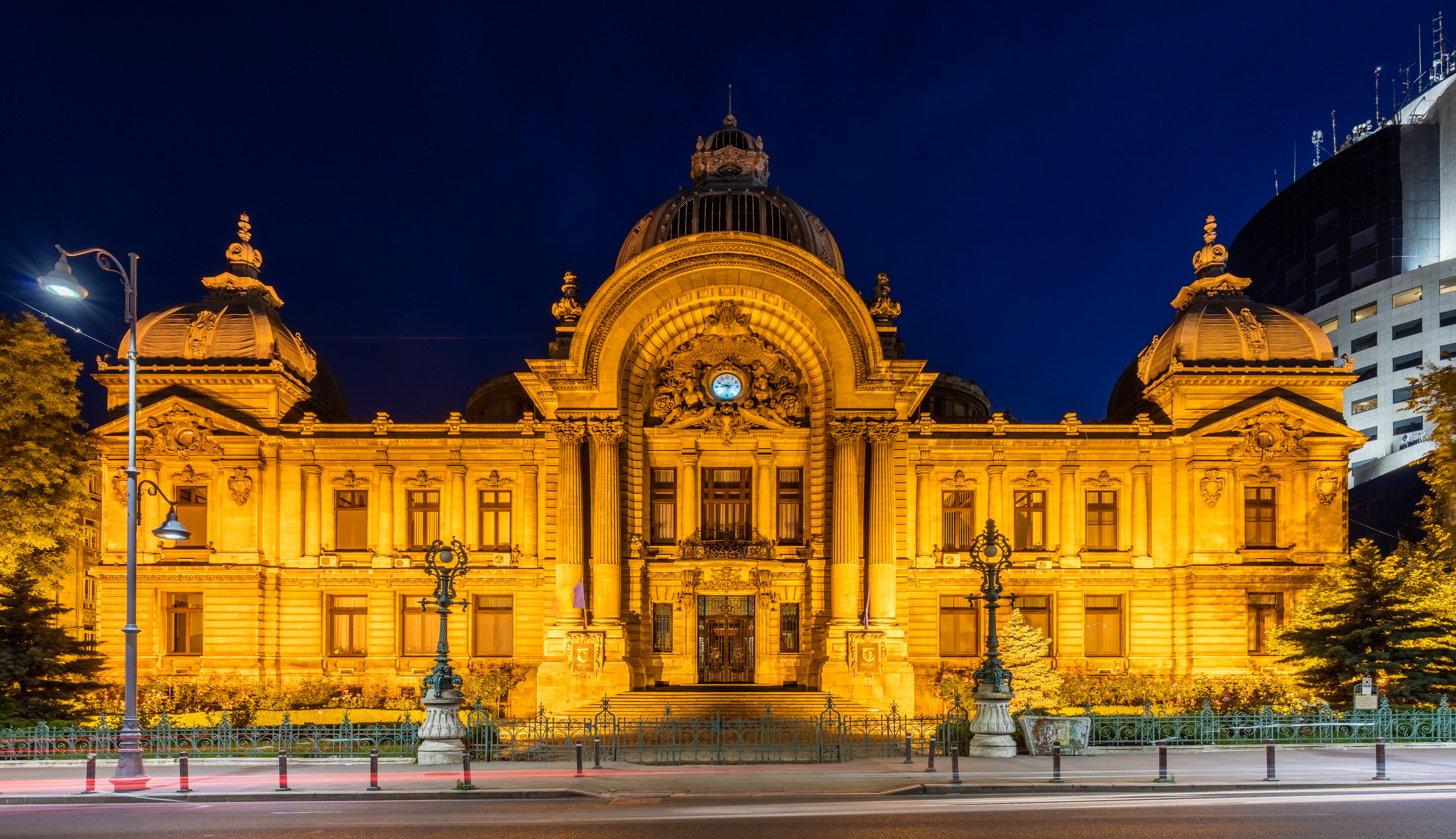
The CEC Palace on Victory Avenue, Bucharest, Romania, by Paul Gottereau, 1897-1900

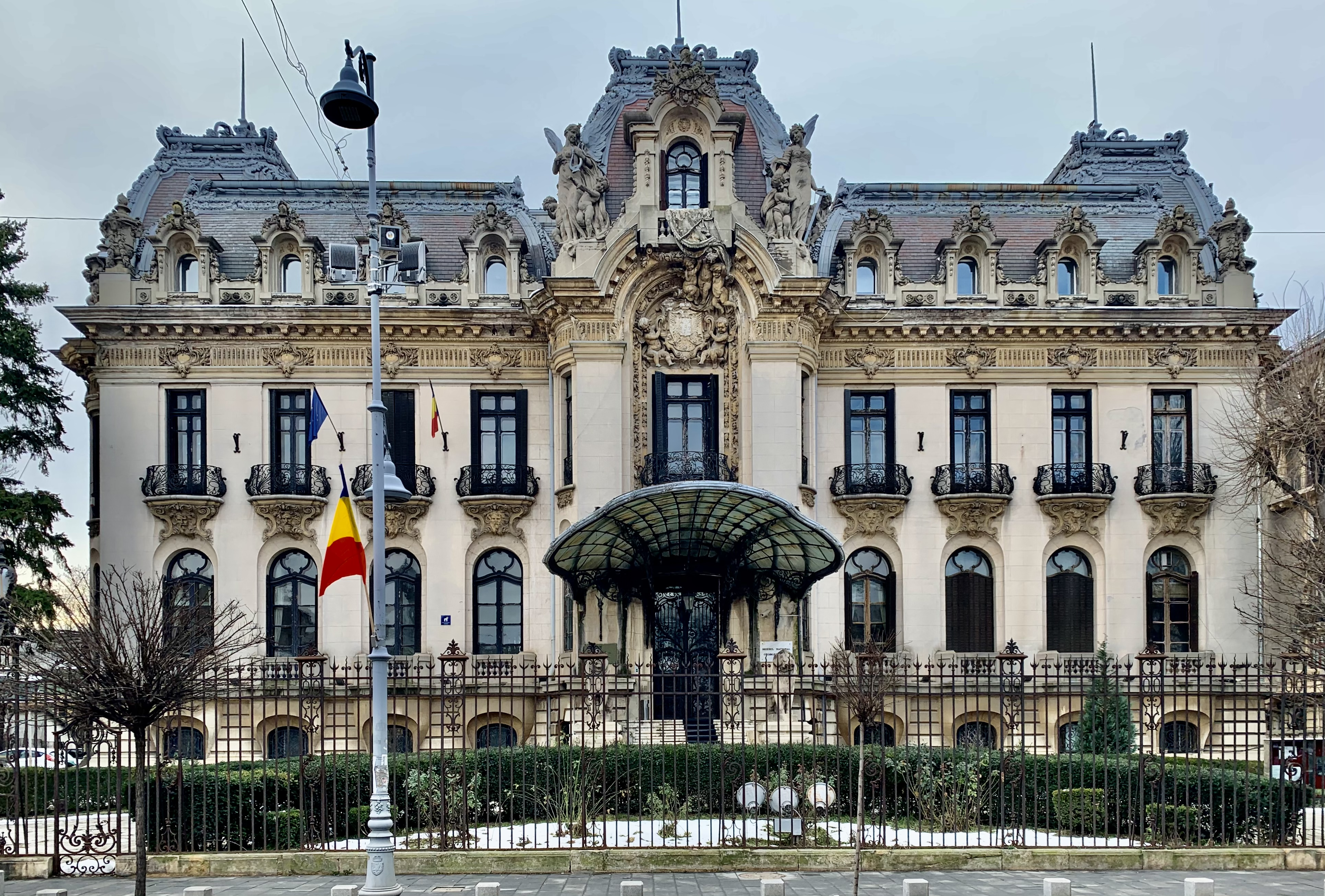
Cantacuzino Palace, Bucharest, by Ion D. Berindey, 1898-1906

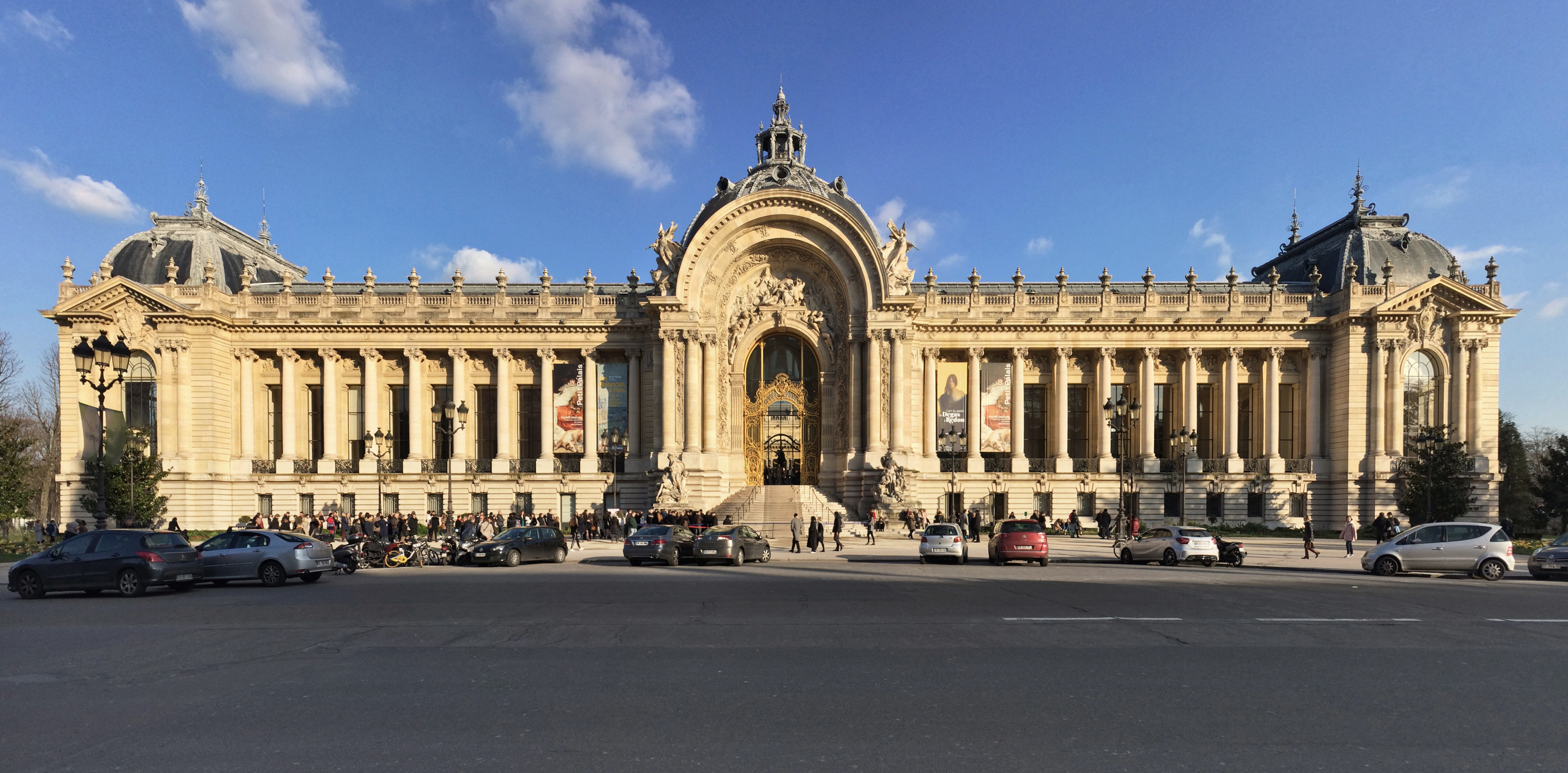
Petit Palais, Paris, by Charles Giraud, 1900

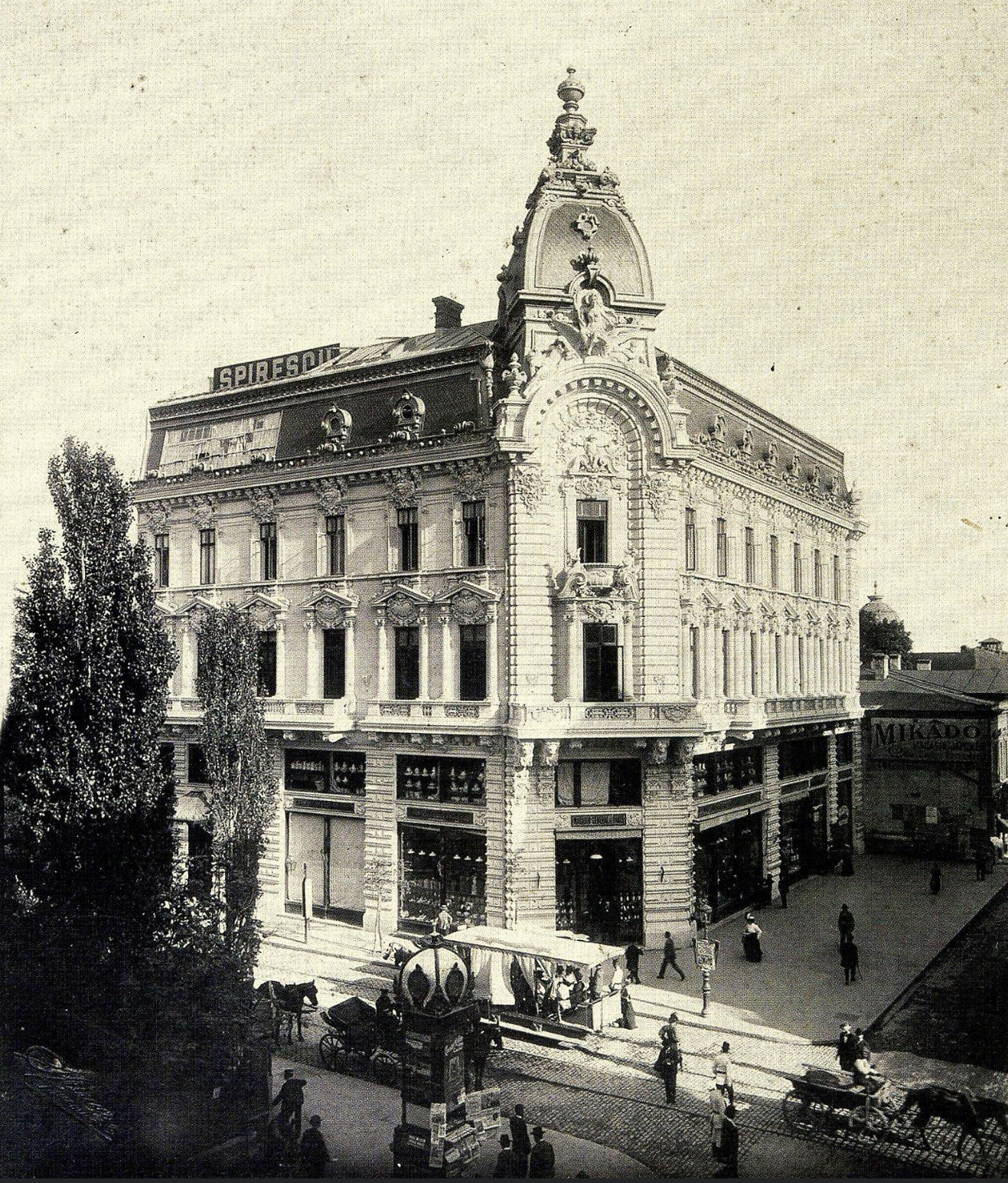
Anker Building, Bucharest, by Leonida Negrescu, c.1900

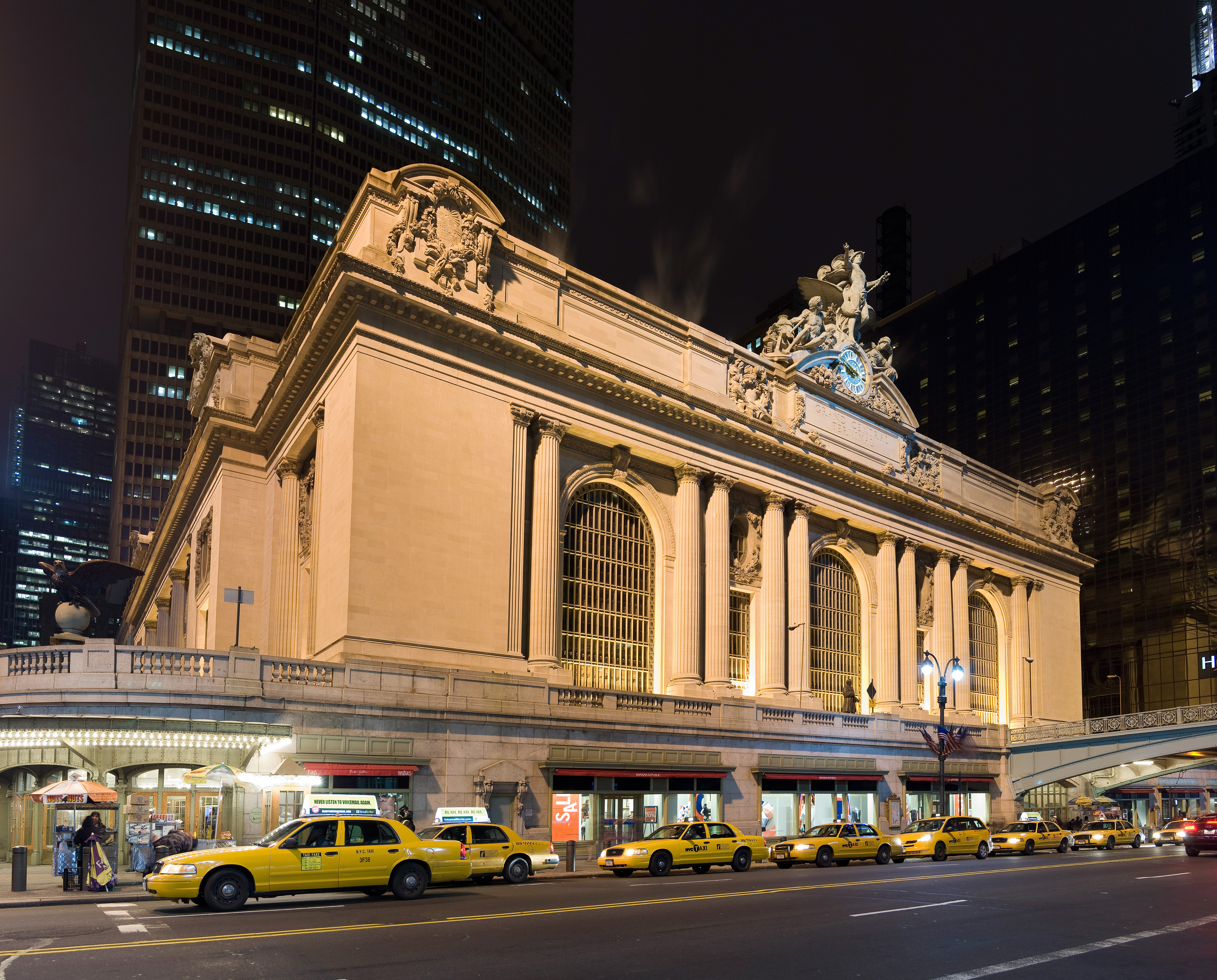
Grand Central Terminal, New York City, by Reed and Stem and Warren and Wetmore, 1903

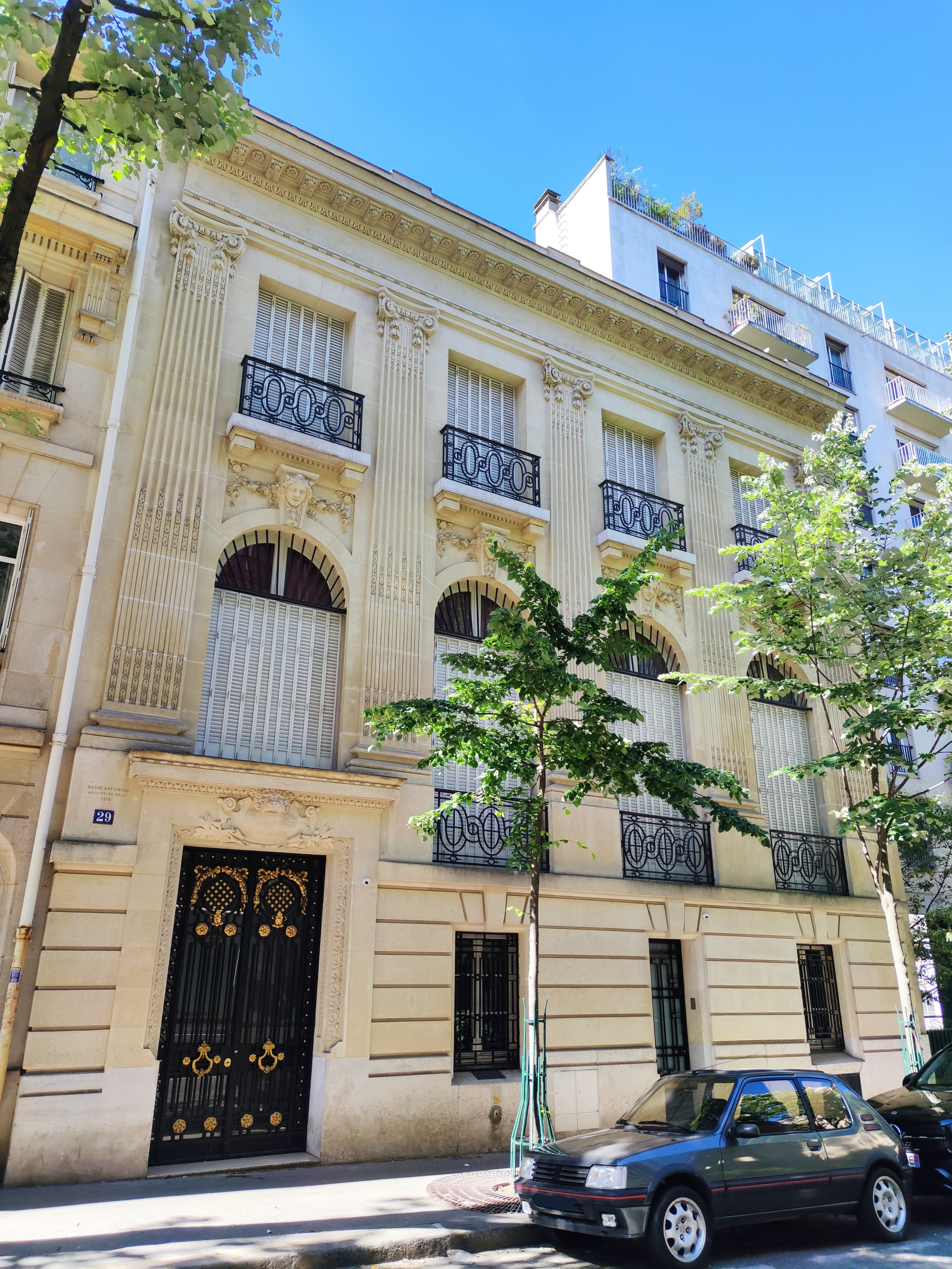
Hôtel Roxoroid de Belfort, Paris, 1911, by André Arfvidson

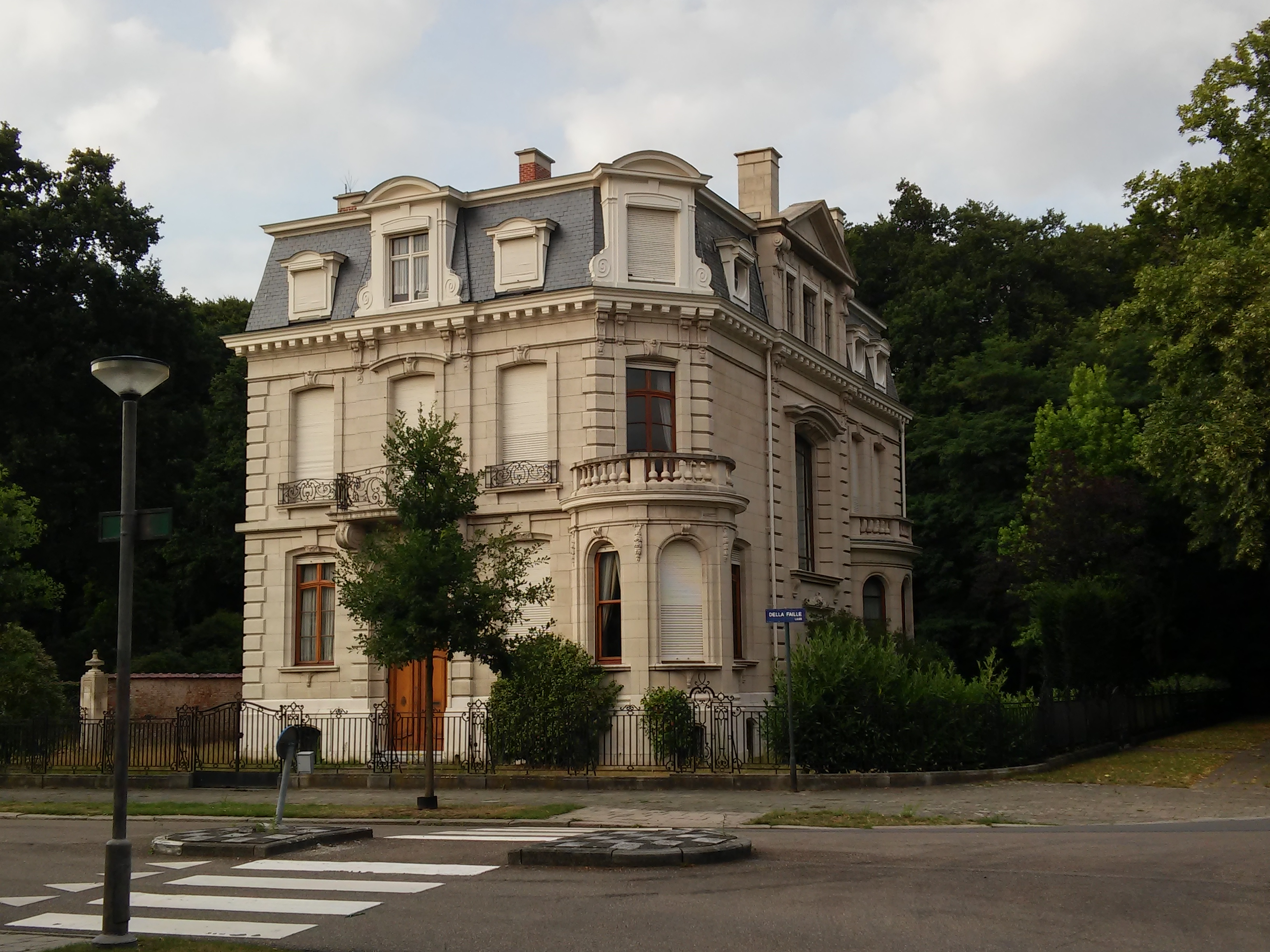
Villa, Antwerp, Belgium, by Michel De Braey, 1913

The Beaux-Arts style takes its name from the École des Beaux-Arts in Paris, where it developed and where many of the main exponents of the style studied. Due to the fact that international students studied here, there are buildings from the second half of the 19th century and the early 20th century of this type all over the world, designed by architects like Charles Girault, Thomas Hastings, Ion D. Berindey or Petre Antonescu. Today, from Bucharest to Buenos Aires and from San Francisco to Brussels, the Beaux-Arts style survives in opera houses, civic structures, university campuses commemorative monuments, luxury hotels and townhouses. The style was heavily influenced by the Paris Opéra House (1860–1875), designed by Charles Garnier, the masterpiece of the 19th century renovation of Paris, dominating its entire neighbourhood and continuing to astonish visitors with its majestic staircase and reception halls. The Opéra was an aesthetic and societal turning point in French architecture. Here, Garnier showed what he called a style actuel, which was influenced by the spirit of the time, aka Zeitgeist, and reflected the designer's personal taste.

Beaux-Arts façades were usually imbricated, or layered with overlapping classical elements or sculpture. Often façades consisted of a high rusticated basement level, after it a few floors high level, usually decorated with pilasters or columns, and at the top an attic level and/or the roof. Beaux-Arts architects were often commissioned to design monumental civic buildings symbolic of the self-confidence of the town or city. The style aimed for a Baroque opulence through lavishly decorated monumental structures that evoked Louis XIV's Versailles. However, it was not just a revival of the Baroque, being more of a synthesis of Classicist styles, like Renaissance, Baroque, Rococo, Neoclassicism etc.

=== Industry and new technologies ===
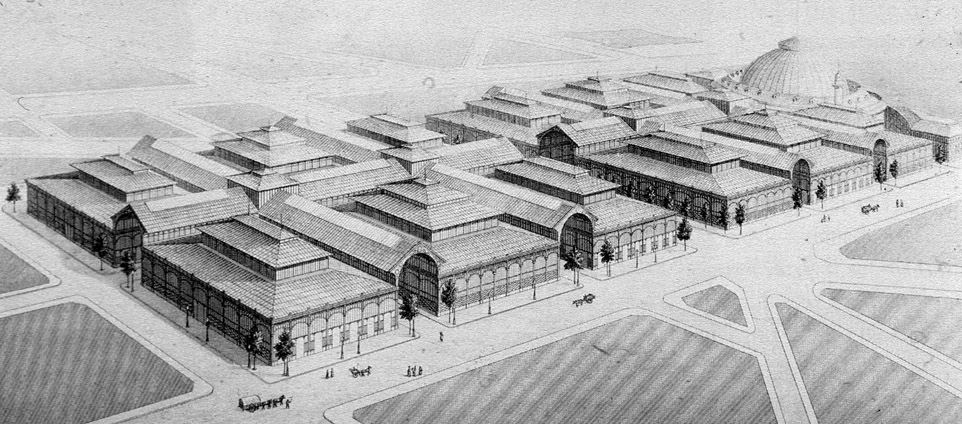
Les Halles, Paris, by Victor Baltard, 1852-1855

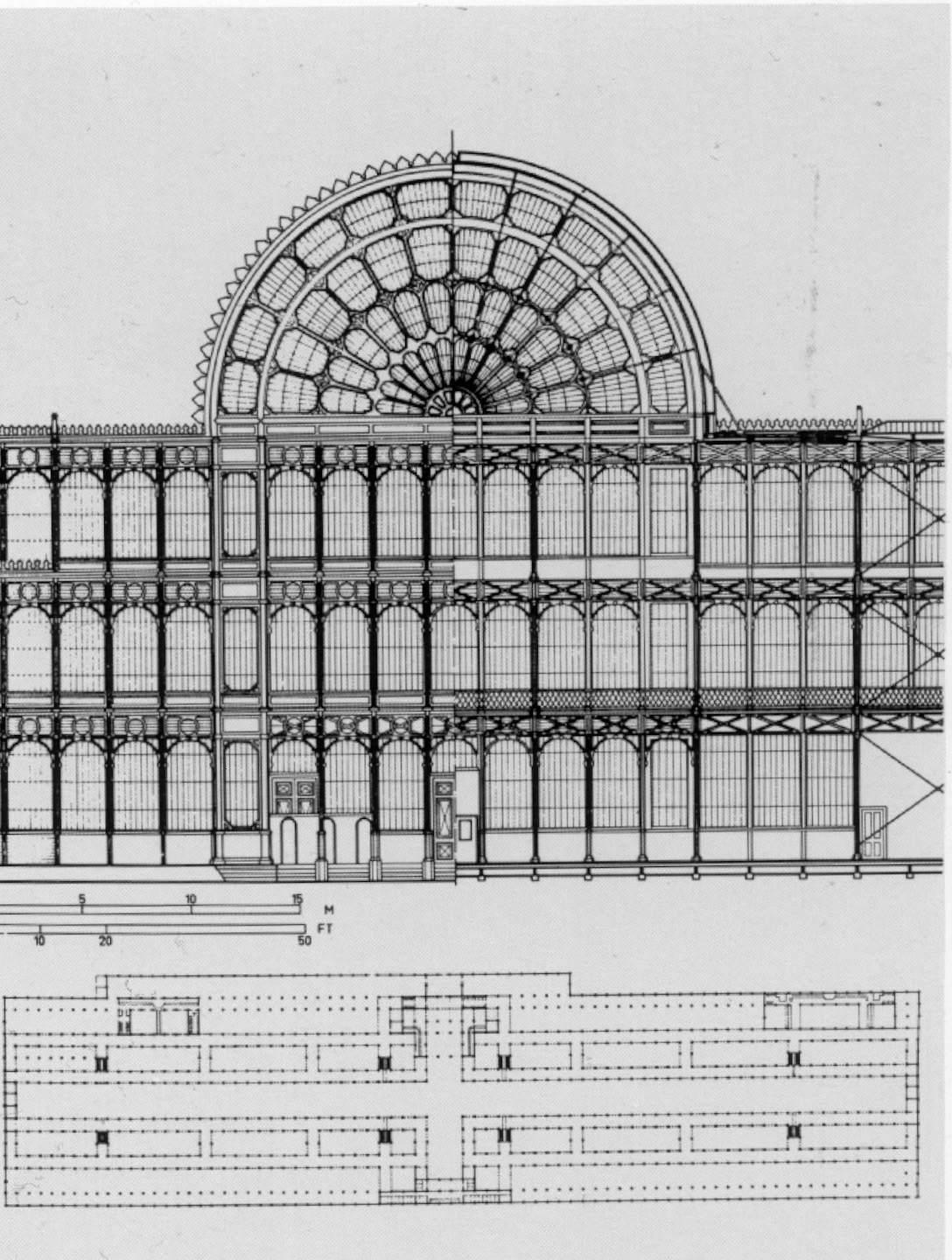
Plan and elevation for the Crystal Palace, London, by Joseph Paxton, 1854

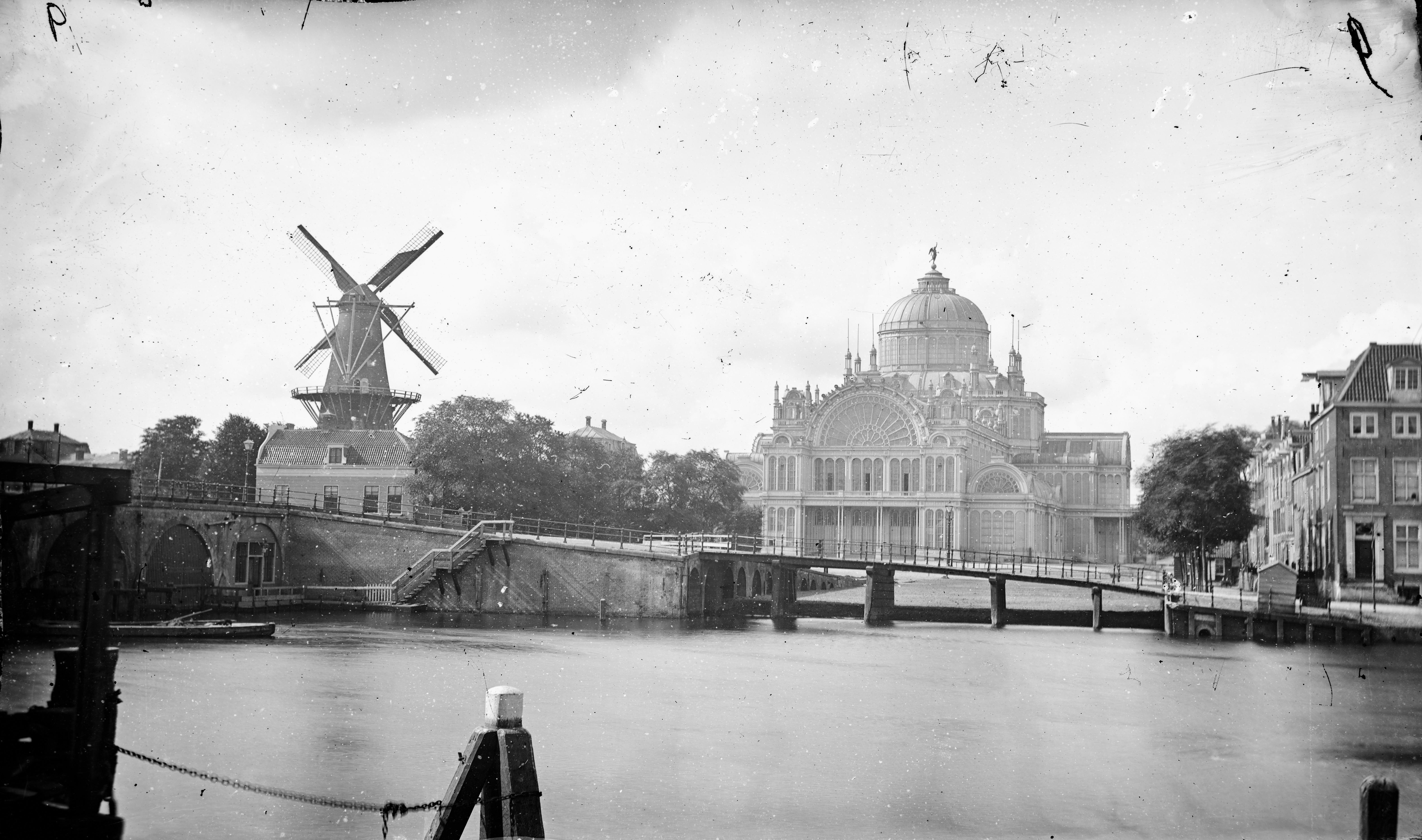
Paleis voor Volksvlijt, Amsterdam, Netherlands, by Cornelis Outshoorn, 1859–1964

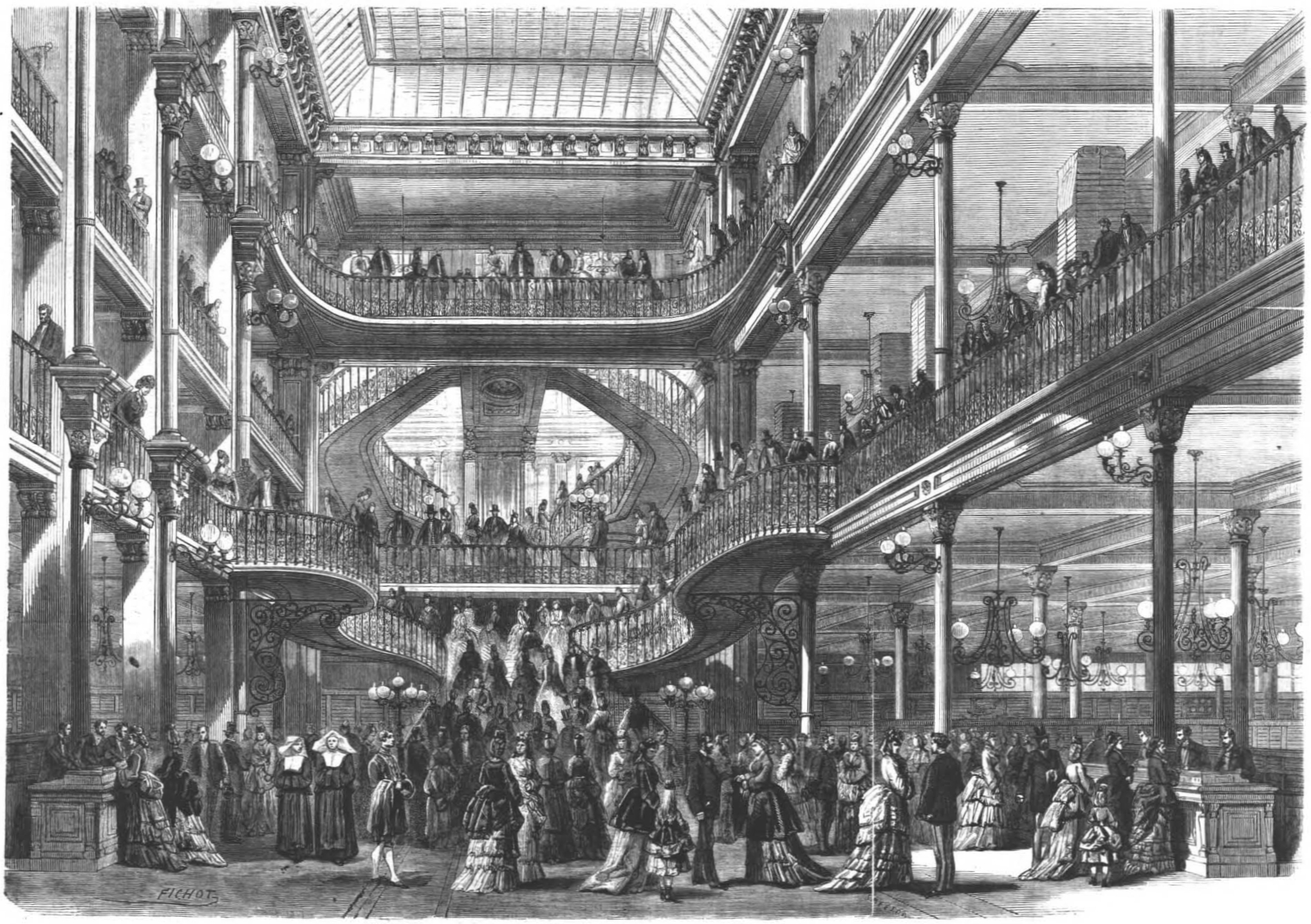
Le Bon Marché, Paris, by Louis-Charles Boileau in collaboration with the engineering firm of Gustave Eiffel, 1872

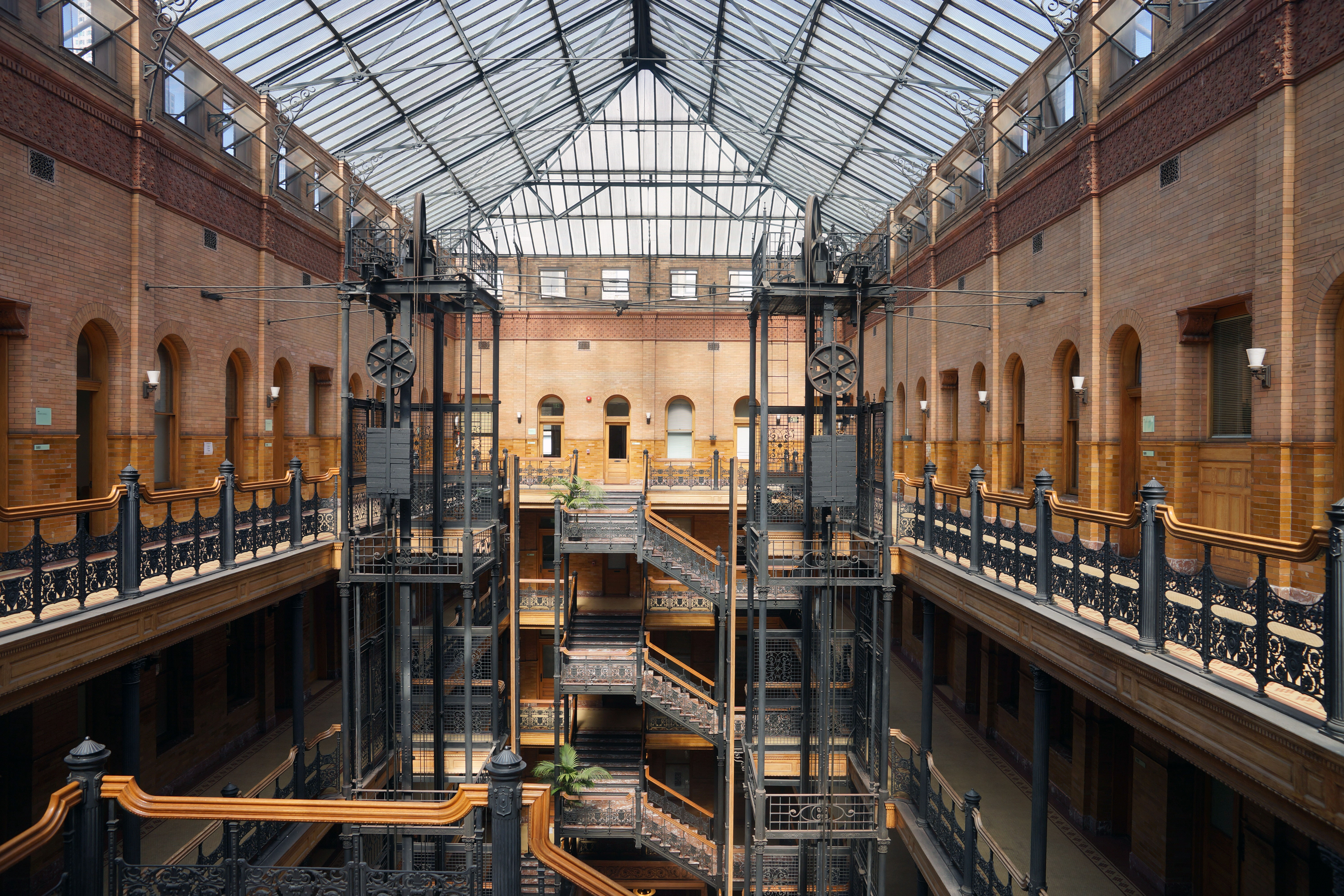
Interior of the Bradbury Building, with its exposed staircases and free-standing hydraulic elevators, Los Angeles, USA, by George Herbert Wyman, 1889-1893

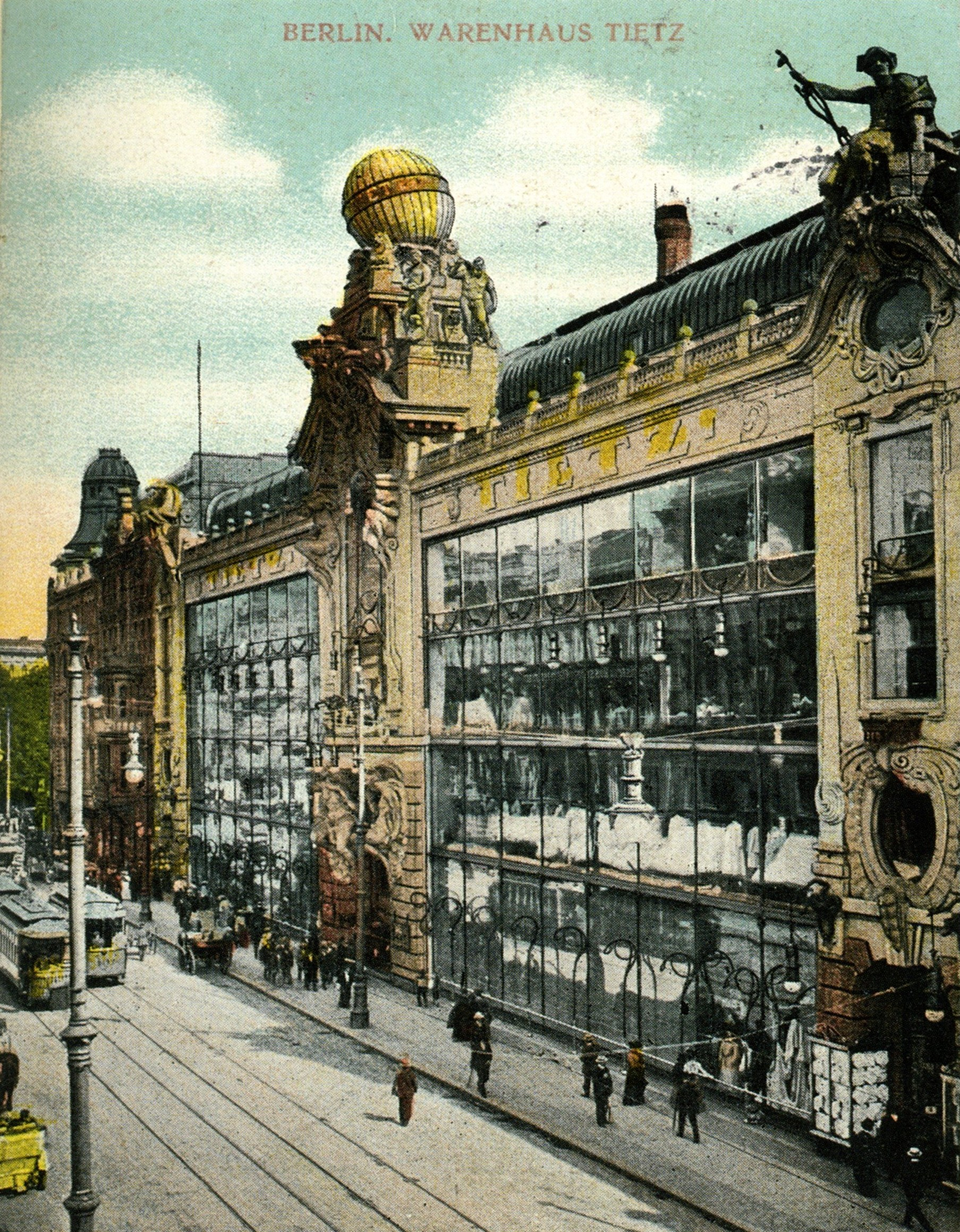
Tietz Department Store, with its huge shop windows running through all the floors, Berlin, Germany, by Bernhard Sehring and L.Lachmann, 1899-1900

Because of the Industrial Revolution and the new technologies it brought, new types of buildings appeared. By 1850 iron was quite present in daily life at every scale, from mass-produced decorative architectural details and objects of apartment buildings and commercial buildings to train sheds. A well-known 19th century glass and iron building is the Crystal Palace from Hyde Park (London), built in 1851 to house the Great Exhibition, having an appearance similar to a greenhouse. Its scale was daunting.

The marketplace pioneered novel uses of iron and glass to create an architecture of display and consumption that made the temporary display of the world fairs a permanent feature of modern urban life. Just after a year after the Crystal Palace was dismantaled, Aristide Boucicaut opened what historians of mass consumption have labelled the first department store, Le Bon Marché in Paris. As the store expanded, its exterior took on the form of a public monument, being highly decorated with French Renaissance Revival motifs. The entrances advanced subtly onto the pavement, hoping to captivate the attention of potential customers. Between 1872 and 1874, the interior was remodelled by Louis-Charles Boileau, in collaboration with the young engineering firm of Gustave Eiffel. In place of the open courtyard required to permit more daylight into the interior, the new building focused around three skylight atria.

=== Art Nouveau ===
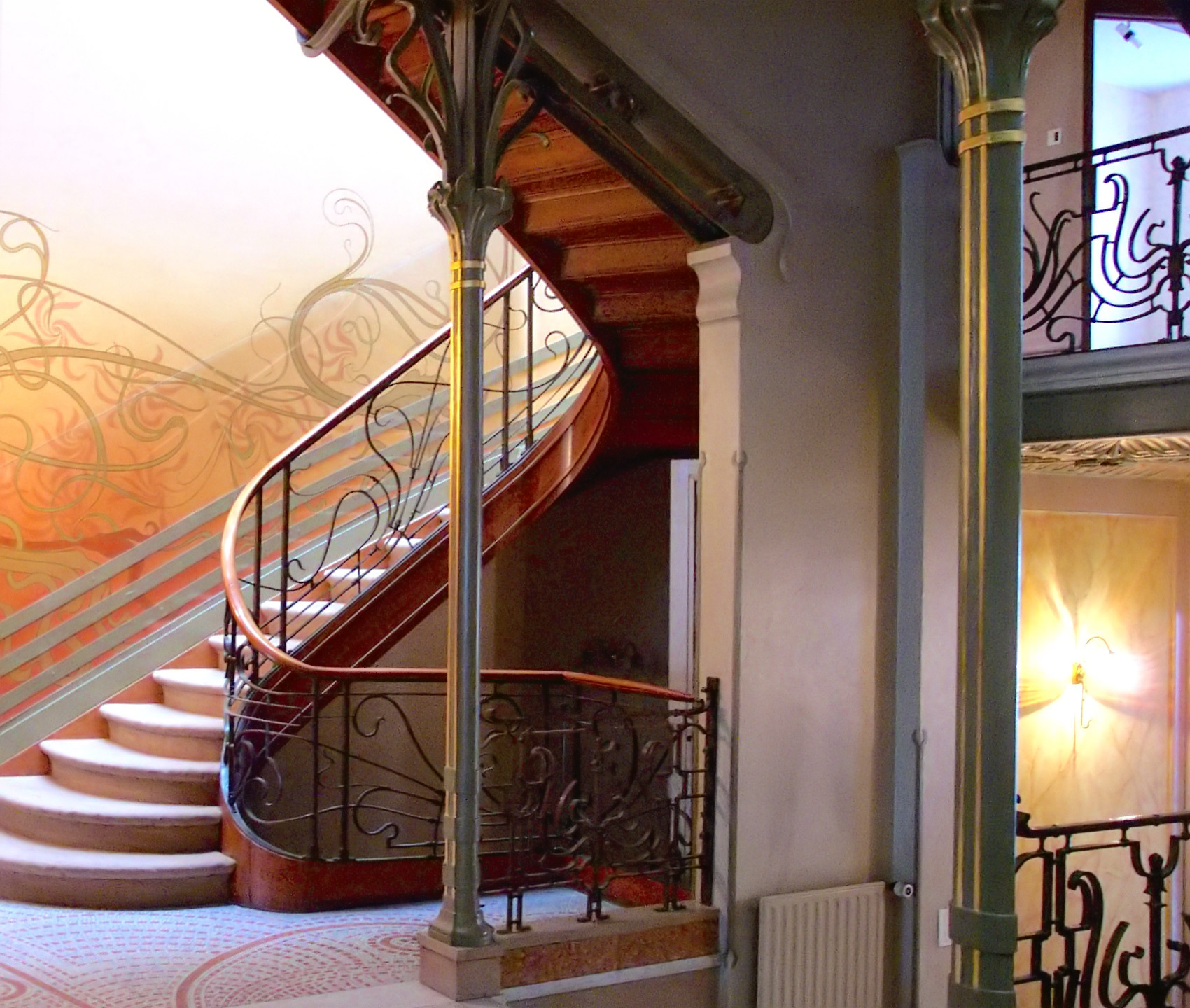
Hôtel Tassel, Brussels, Belgium, by Victor Horta, 1894

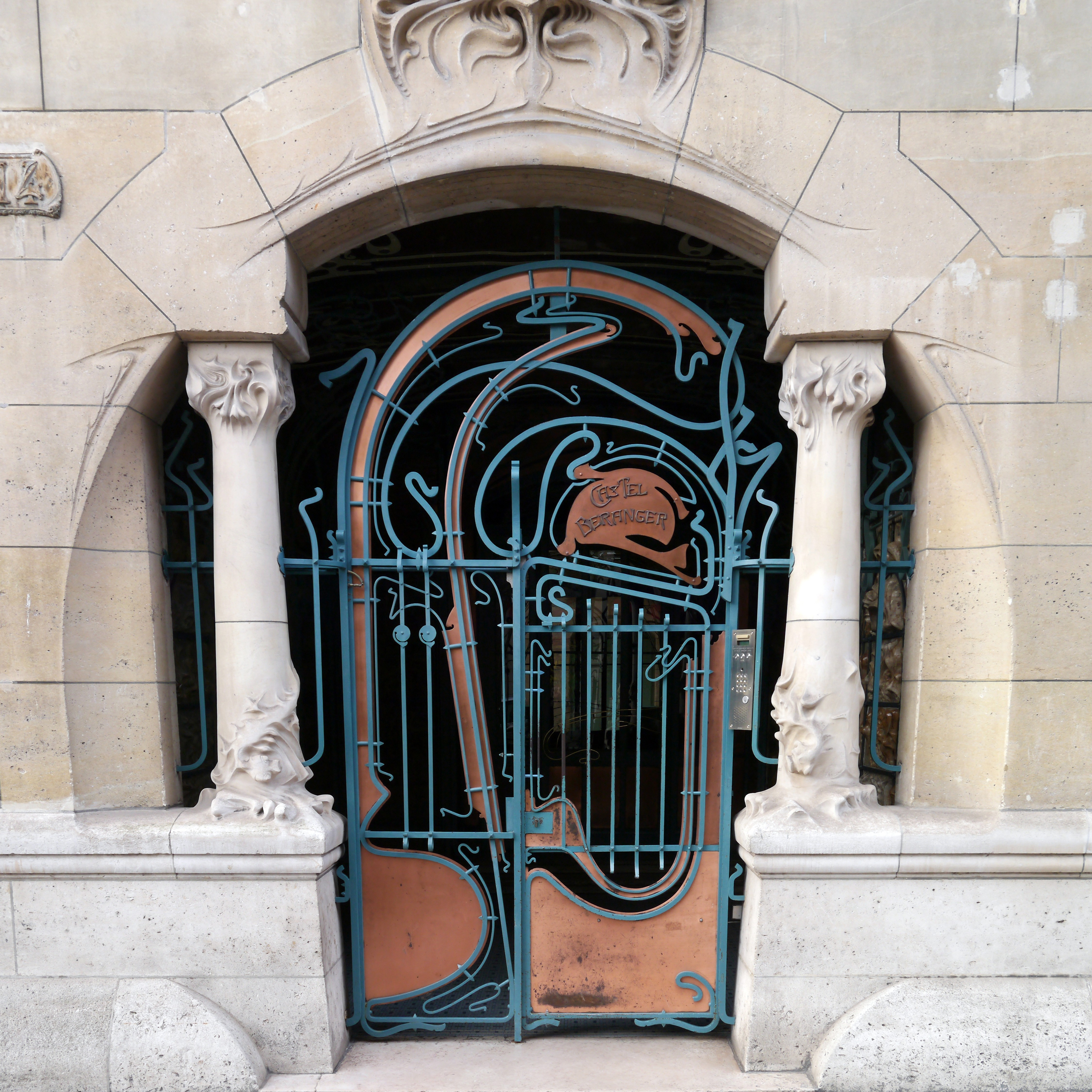
Entrance of the Castel Béranger, Paris, by Hector Guimard, 1895–1898

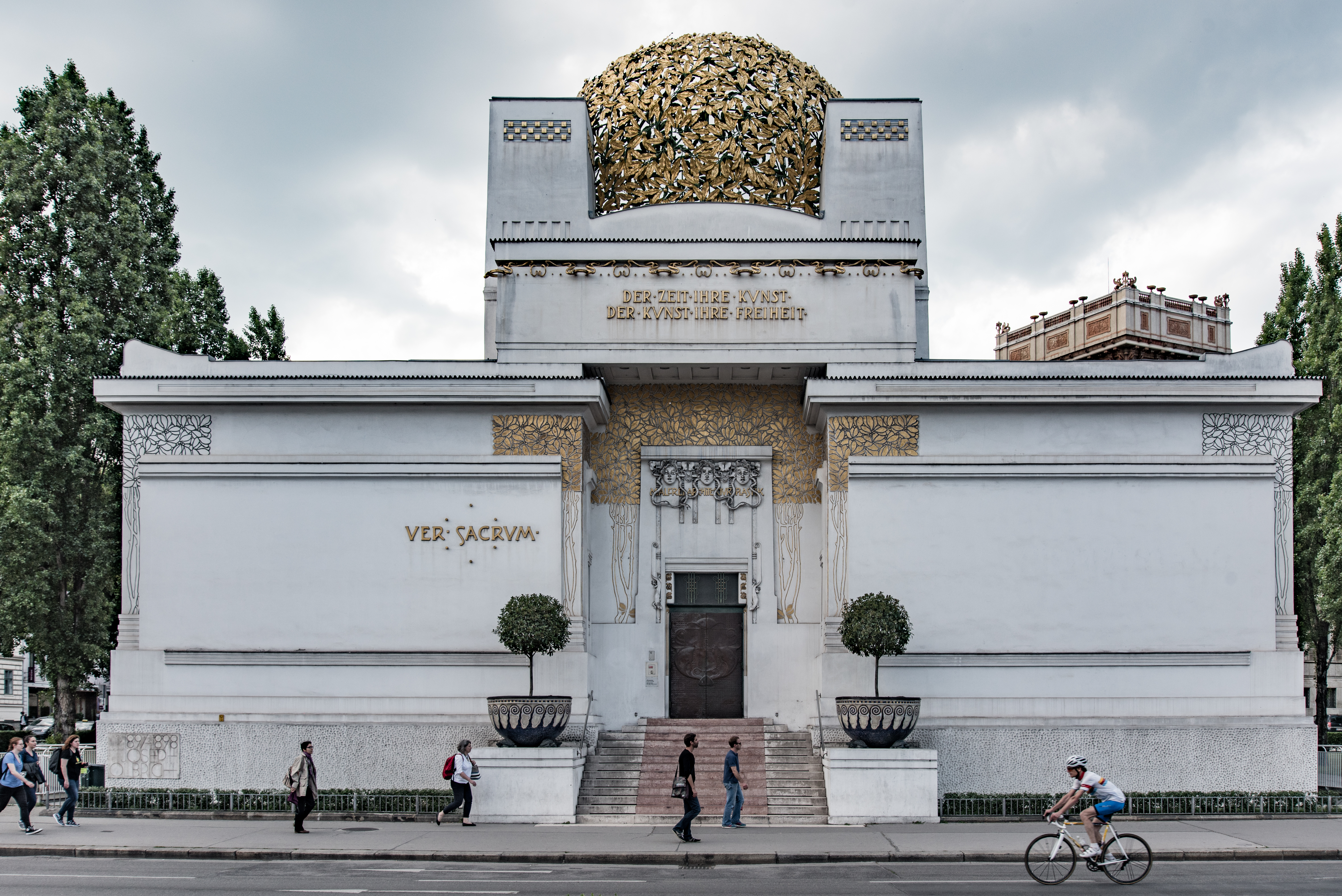
Secession Building, Vienna, Austria, by Joseph Maria Olbrich, 1897

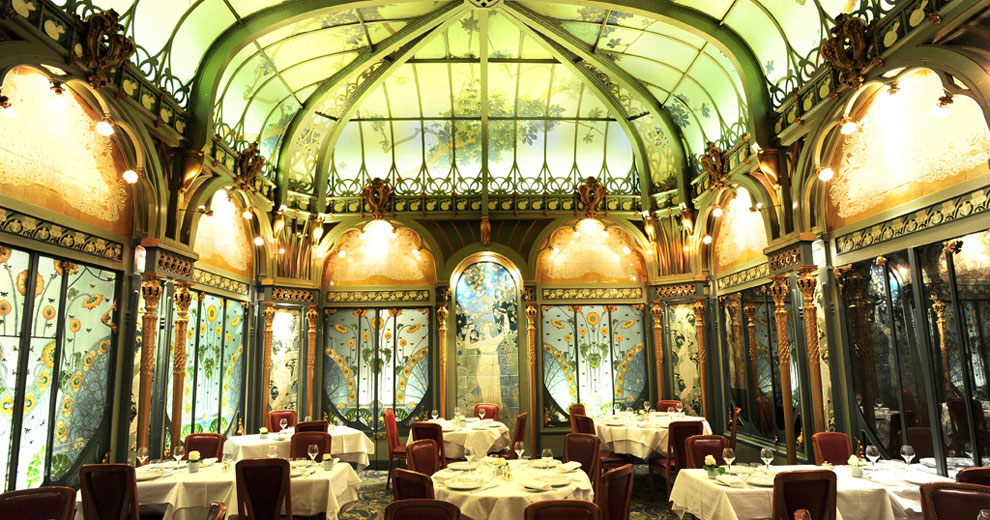
La Fermette Marbeuf, Paris, by Émile Hurtré, 1898

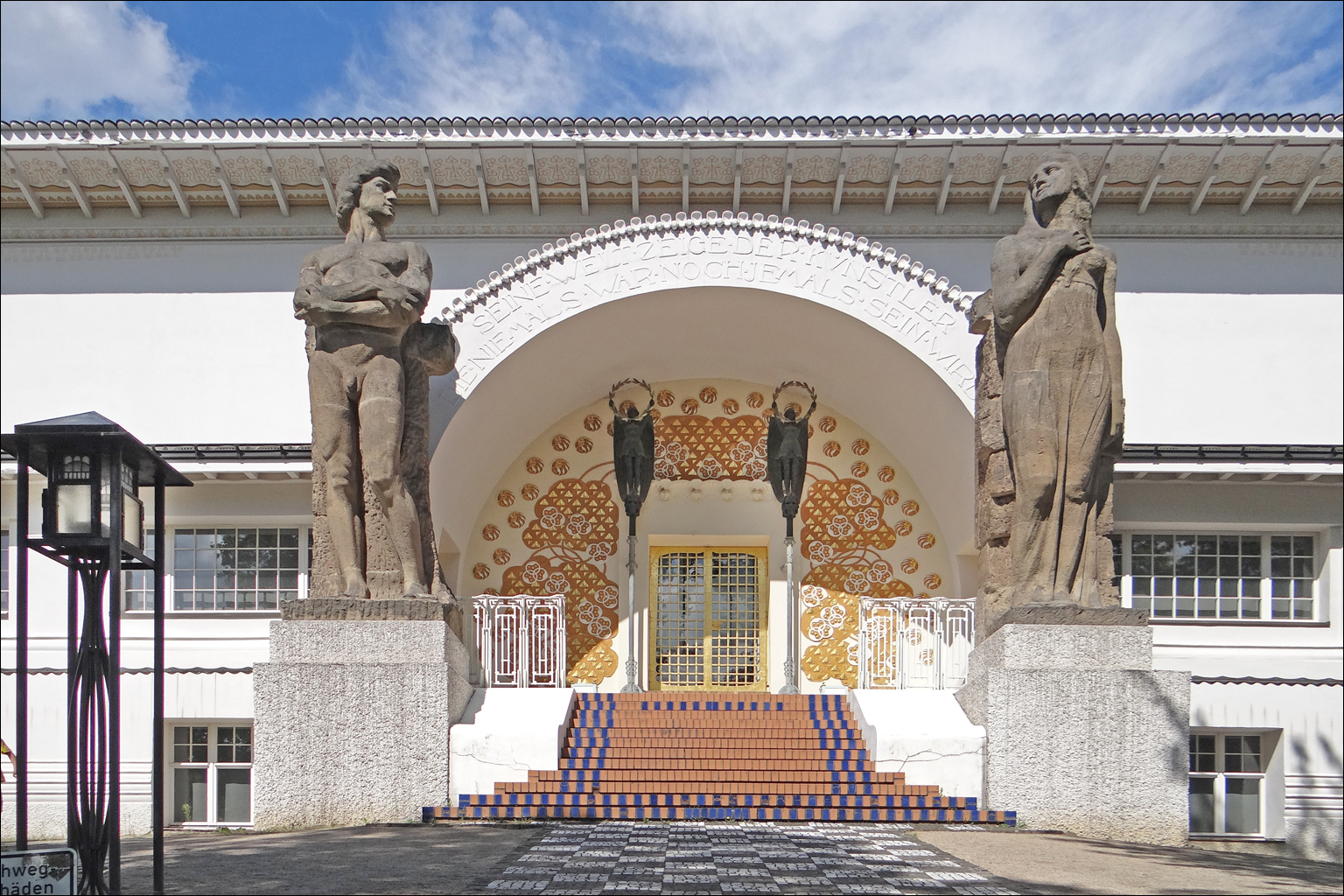
Ernst Ludwig House in Darmstadt Artists' Colony, Darmstadt, Germany, by Joseph Maria Olbrich (1900)

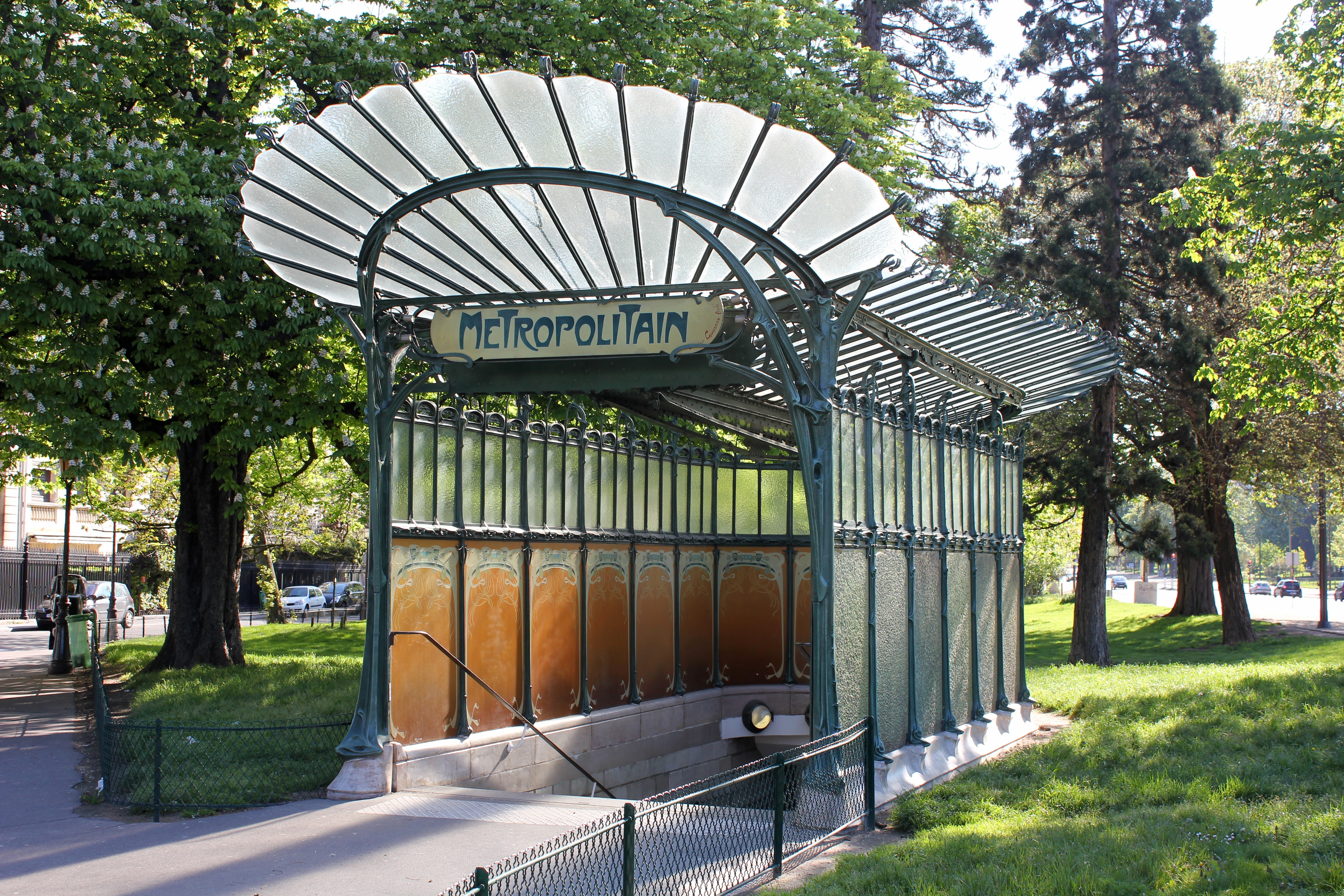
The Porte Dauphine Métro Station, Paris, by Hector Guimard, 1900

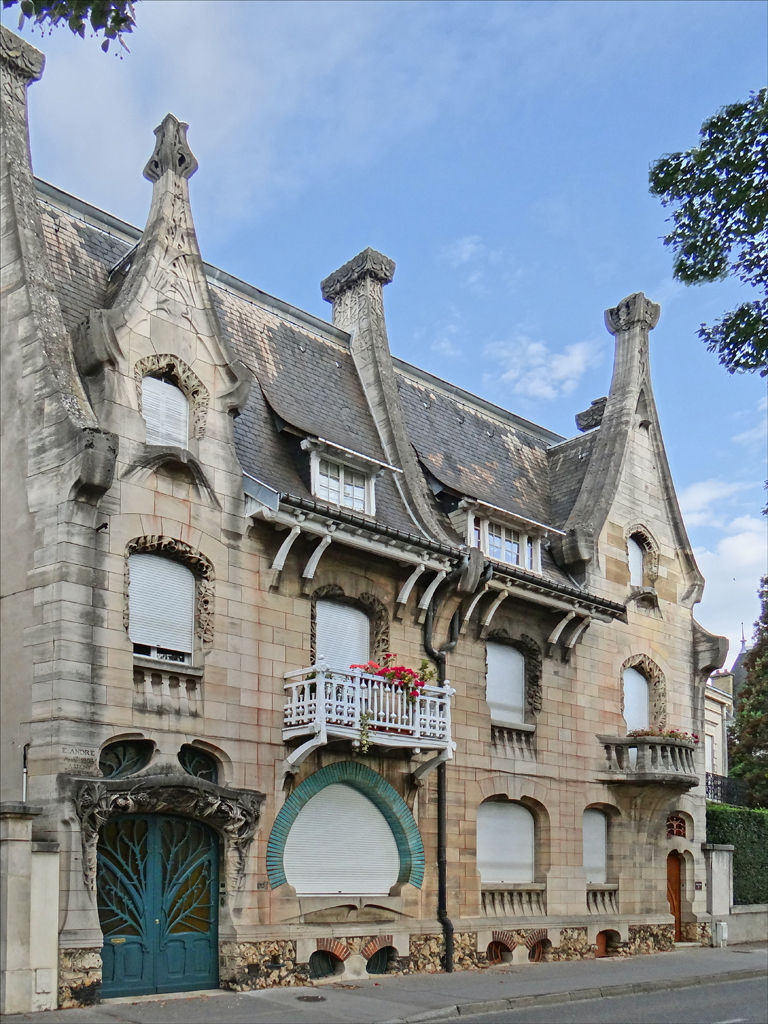
Maison Huot, Nancy, France, by Émile André, 1903

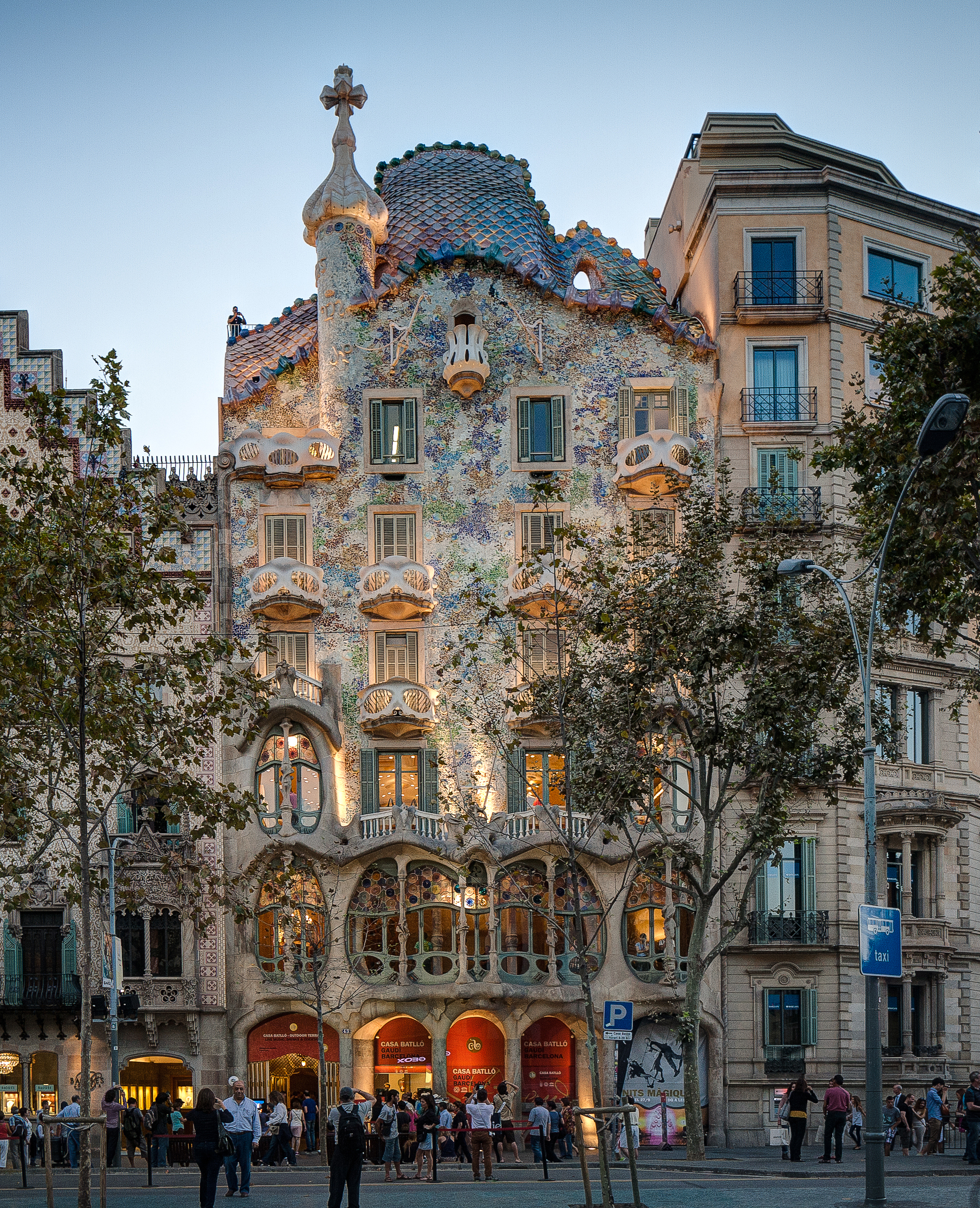
Casa Batlló, Barcelona, Spain, by Antoni Gaudí, 1904–1906

Popular in many countries from the early 1890s until the outbreak of World War I in 1914, Art Nouveau was an influential although relatively brief art and design movement and philosophy. Despite being a short-lived fashion, it paved the way for the modern architecture of the 20th century. Between c. 1870 and 1900, a crisis of historicism occurred, during which the historicist culture was critiqued, one of the voices being Friedrich Nietzsche in 1874, who diagnosed 'a malignant historical fervour' as one of the crippling symptoms of a modern culture burdened by archaeological study and faith in the laws of historical progression.

Focusing on natural forms, asymmetry, sinuous lines and whiplash curves, architects and designers aimed to escape the excessively ornamental styles and historical replications, popular during the 19th century. However, the style was not completely new, since Art Nouveau artists drew on a huge range of influences, particularly Beaux-Arts architecture, the Arts and Crafts movement, aestheticism and Japanese art. Buildings used materials associated in the 19th century with modernity, such as cast-iron and glass. A good example of this is the Paris Metro entrance at Porte Dauphine by Hector Guimard (1900). Its cast-iron and glass canopy is as much sculpture as it is architecture. In Paris, Art Nouveau was even called Le Style Métro by some. The interest for stylized organic forms of ornamentation originated in the mid 19th century, when it was promoted in The Grammar of Ornament (1854), a pattern book by British architect Owen Jones (architect) (1809–1874).

Whiplash curves and sinuous organic lines are its most familiar hallmarks, however the style can not be summarized only to them, since its forms are much more varied and complex. The movement displayed many national interpretations. Depending on where it manifested, it was inspired by Celtic art, Gothic Revival, Rococo Revival, and Baroque Revival. In Hungary, Romania and Poland, for example, Art Nouveau incorporated folkloric elements. This is true especially in Romania, because it facilitated the appearance of the Romanian Revival style, which draws inspiration from Brâncovenesc architecture and traditional peasant houses and objects. The style also had different names, depending on countries. In Britain it was known as Modern Style, in the Netherlands as Nieuwe Kunst, in Germany and Austria as Jugendstil, in Italy as Liberty style, in Catalonia as Modernisme, in Romania as Arta 1900, and in Japan as Shiro-Uma. It would be wrong to credit any particular place as the only one where the movement appeared, since it seems to have arisen in multiple locations.

=== Modern ===
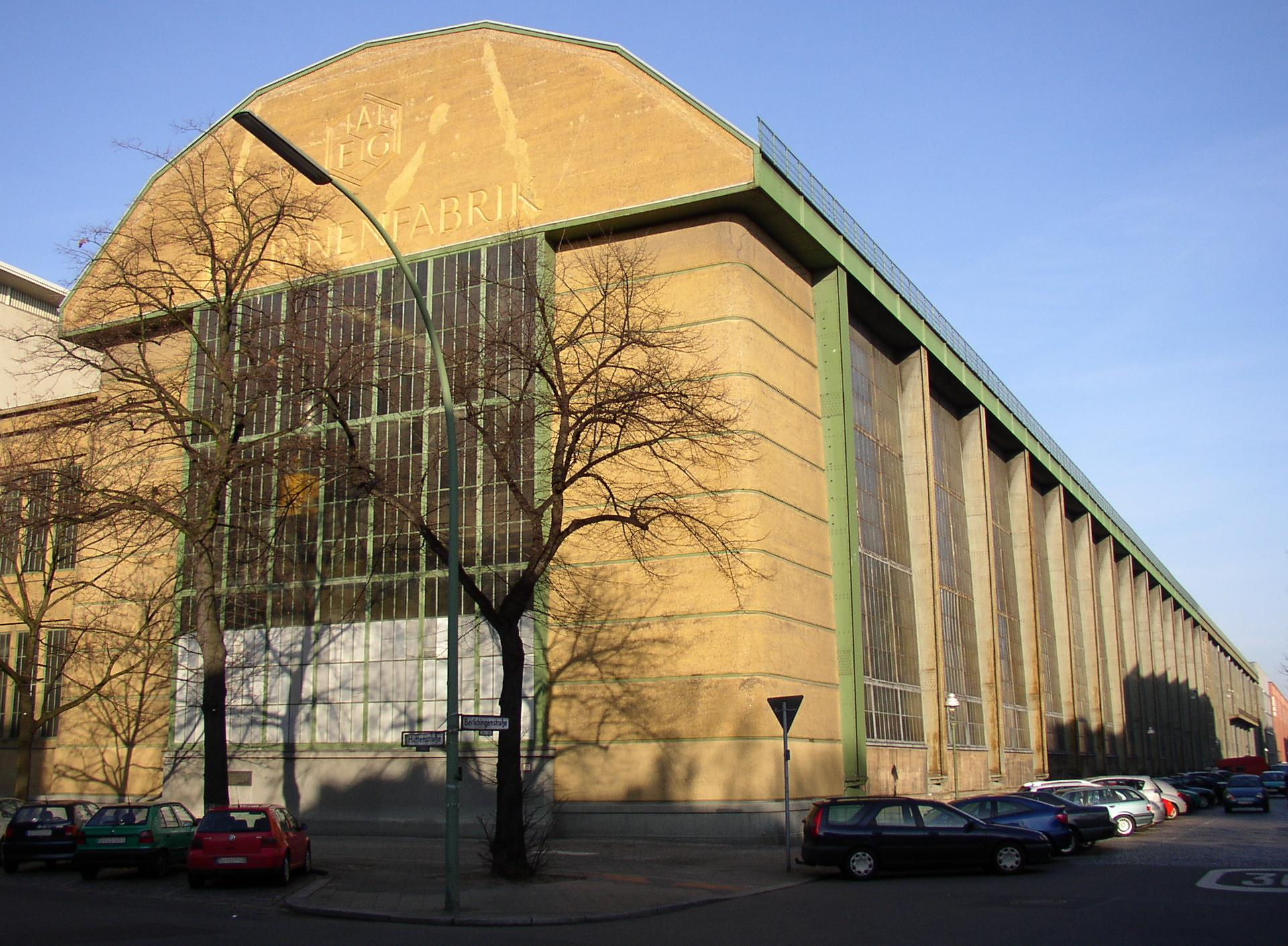
AEG turbine factory, Berlin, Germany, by Peter Behrens, 1909

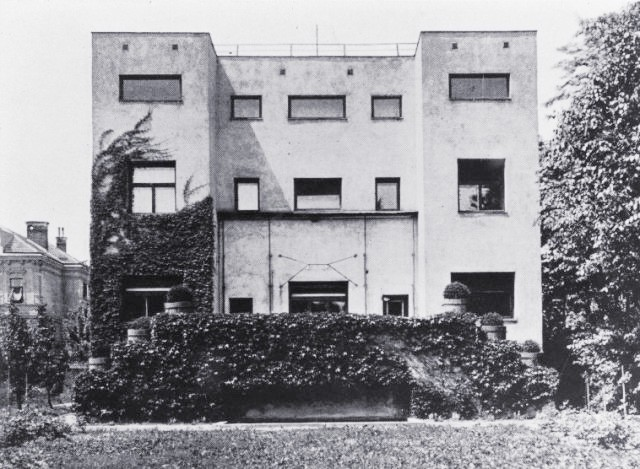
Steiner House, Vienna, Austria, by Adolf Loos, 1910

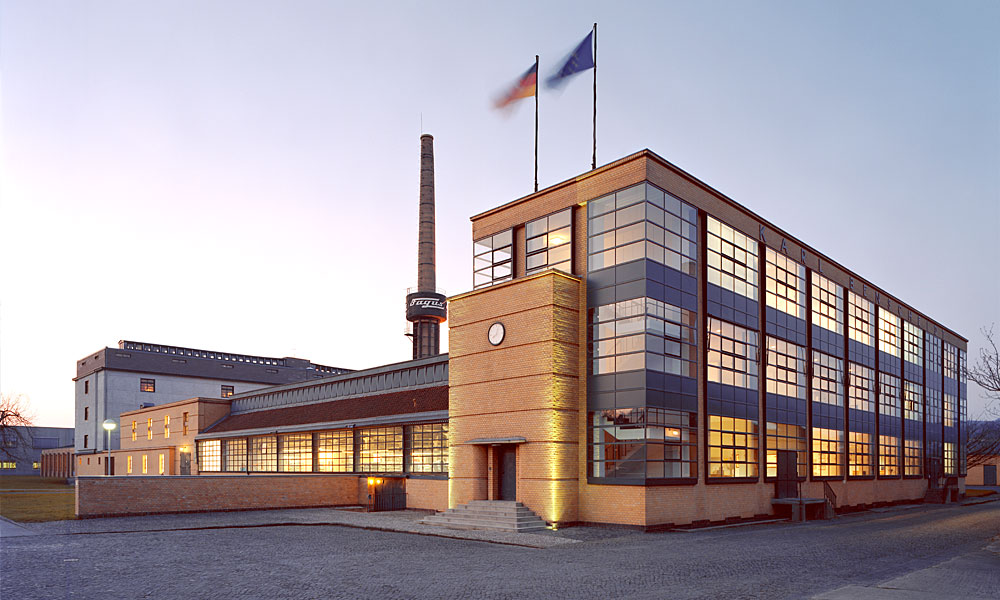
Fagus Factory, Alfeld, Germany, by Walter Gropius, 1911

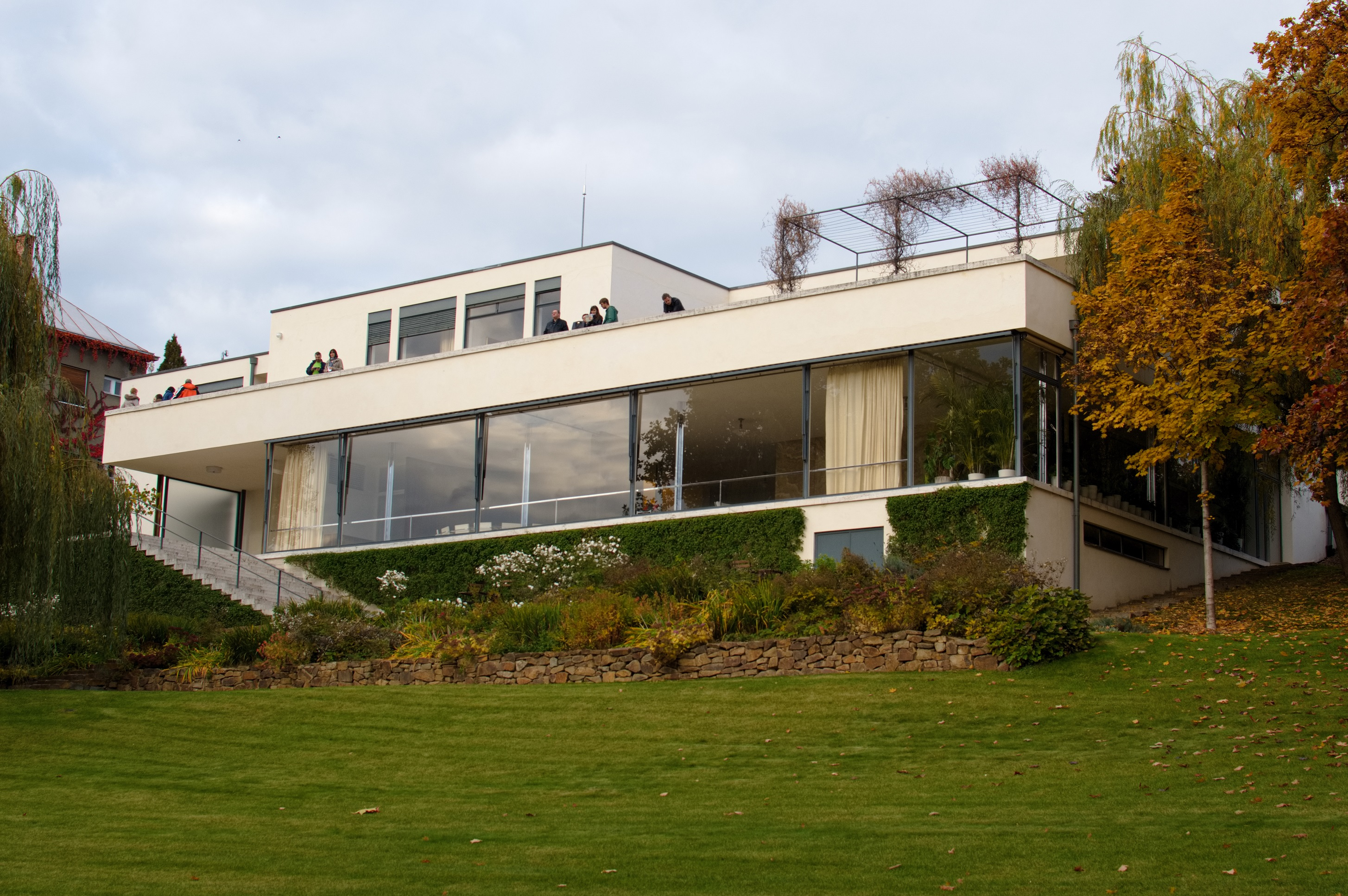
Villa Tugendhat, Brno, Czech Republic, by Ludwig Mies van der Rohe and Lilly Reich, 1930

Rejecting ornament and embracing minimalism and modern materials, Modernist architecture appeared across the world in the early 20th century. Art Nouveau paved the way for it, promoting the idea of non-historicist styles. It developed initially in Europe, focusing on functionalism and the avoidance of decoration. Modernism reached its peak during the 1930s and 1940s with the Bauhaus and the International Style, both characterised by asymmetry, flat roofs, large ribbon windows, metal, glass, white rendering and open-plan interiors.

==== Art Deco ====
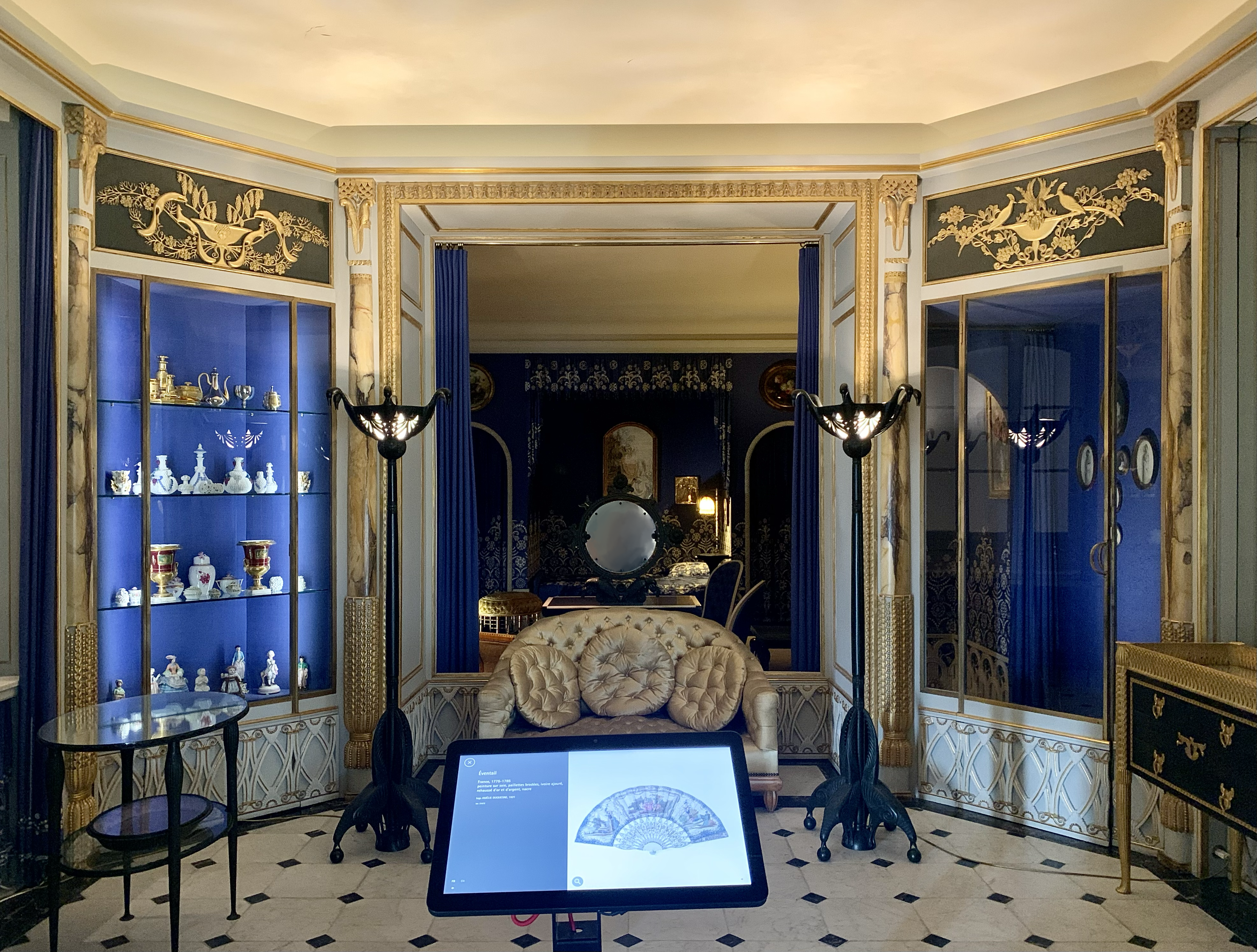
The boudoir of fashion designer Jeanne Lanvin (now in the Museum of Decorative Arts, Paris), by Armand-Albert Rateau, 1920-1922

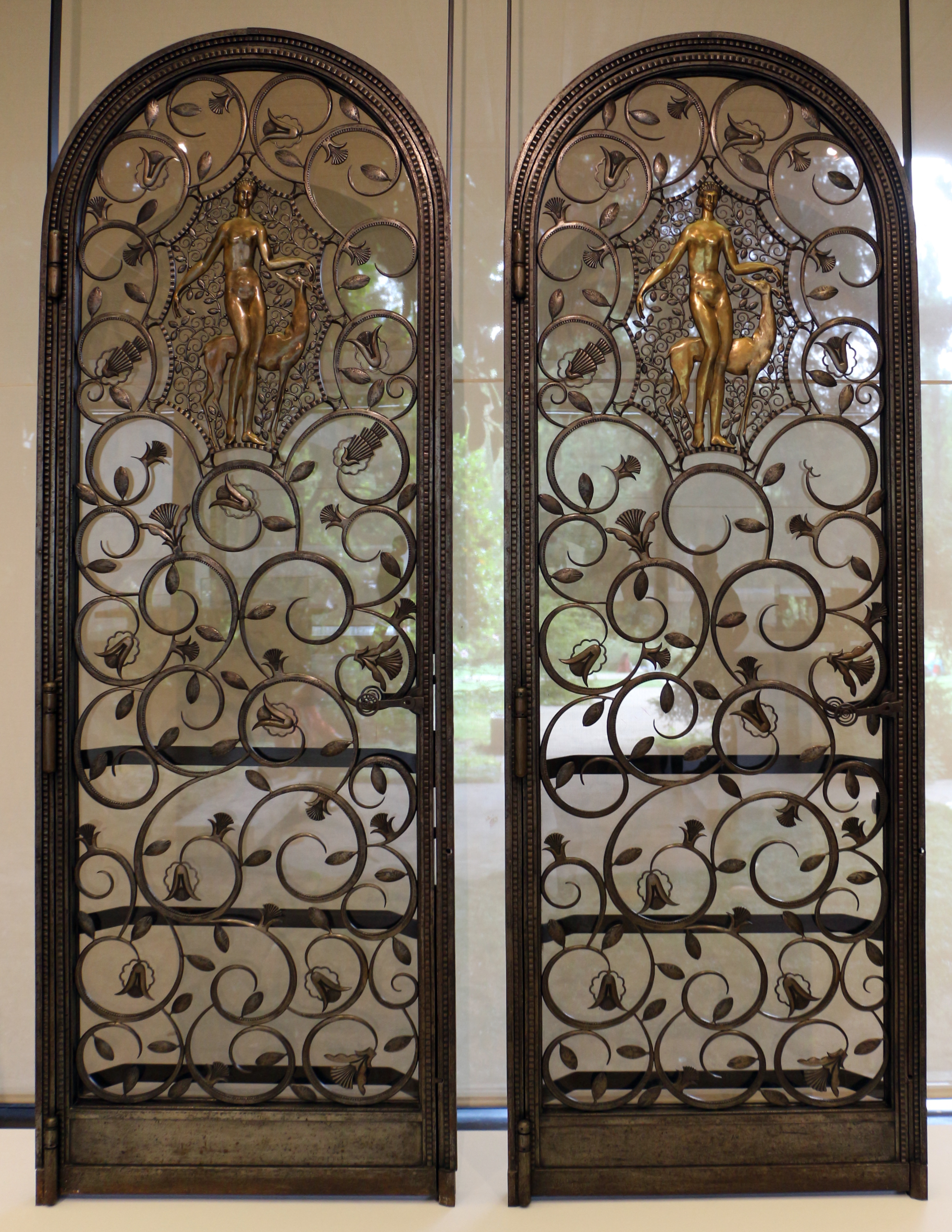
Elevator doors, now in the Calouste Gulbenkian Museum, Lisbon, Portugal, by Edgar Brandt, 1926

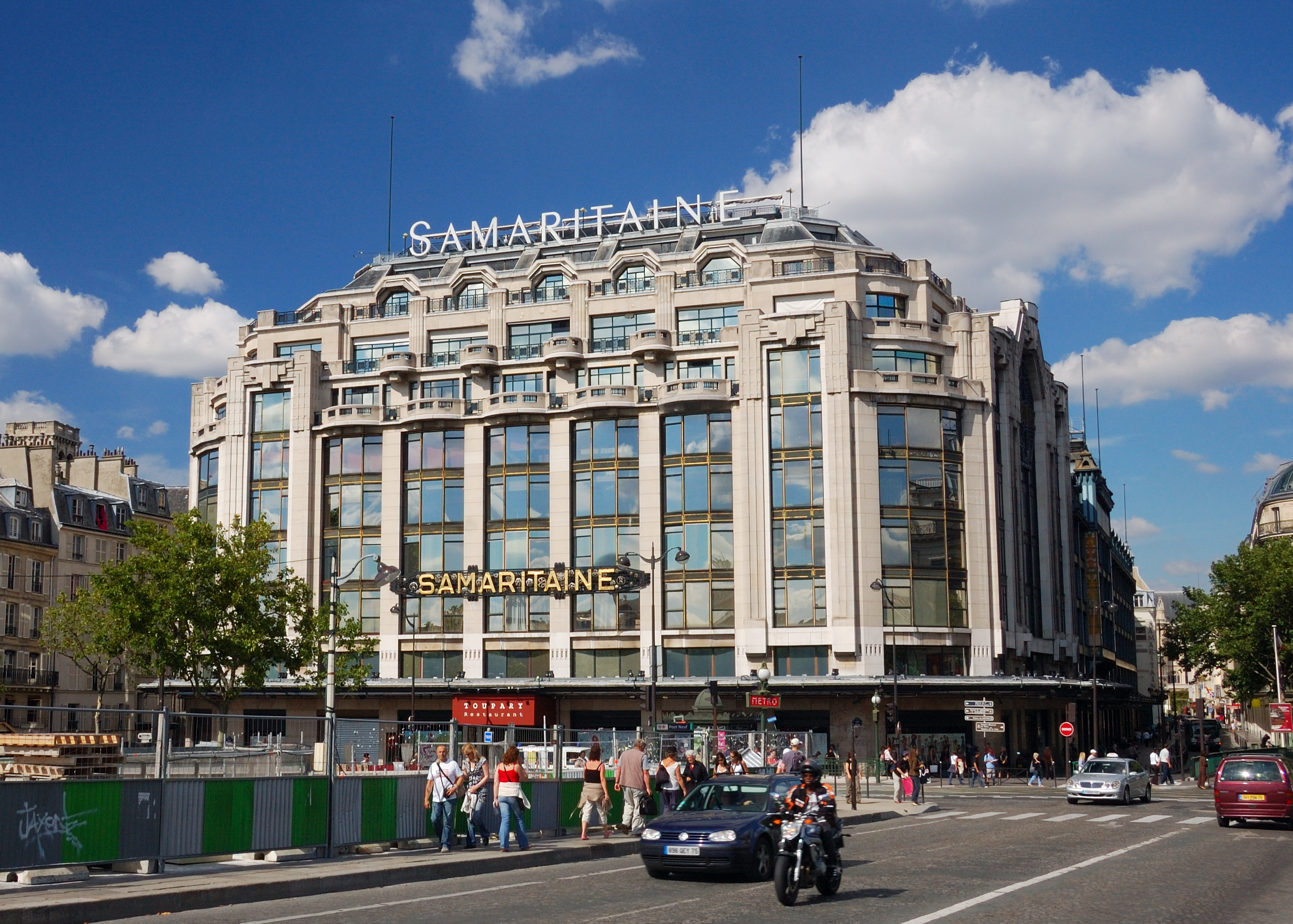
La Samaritaine, Paris, by Henri Sauvage, 1926–1928

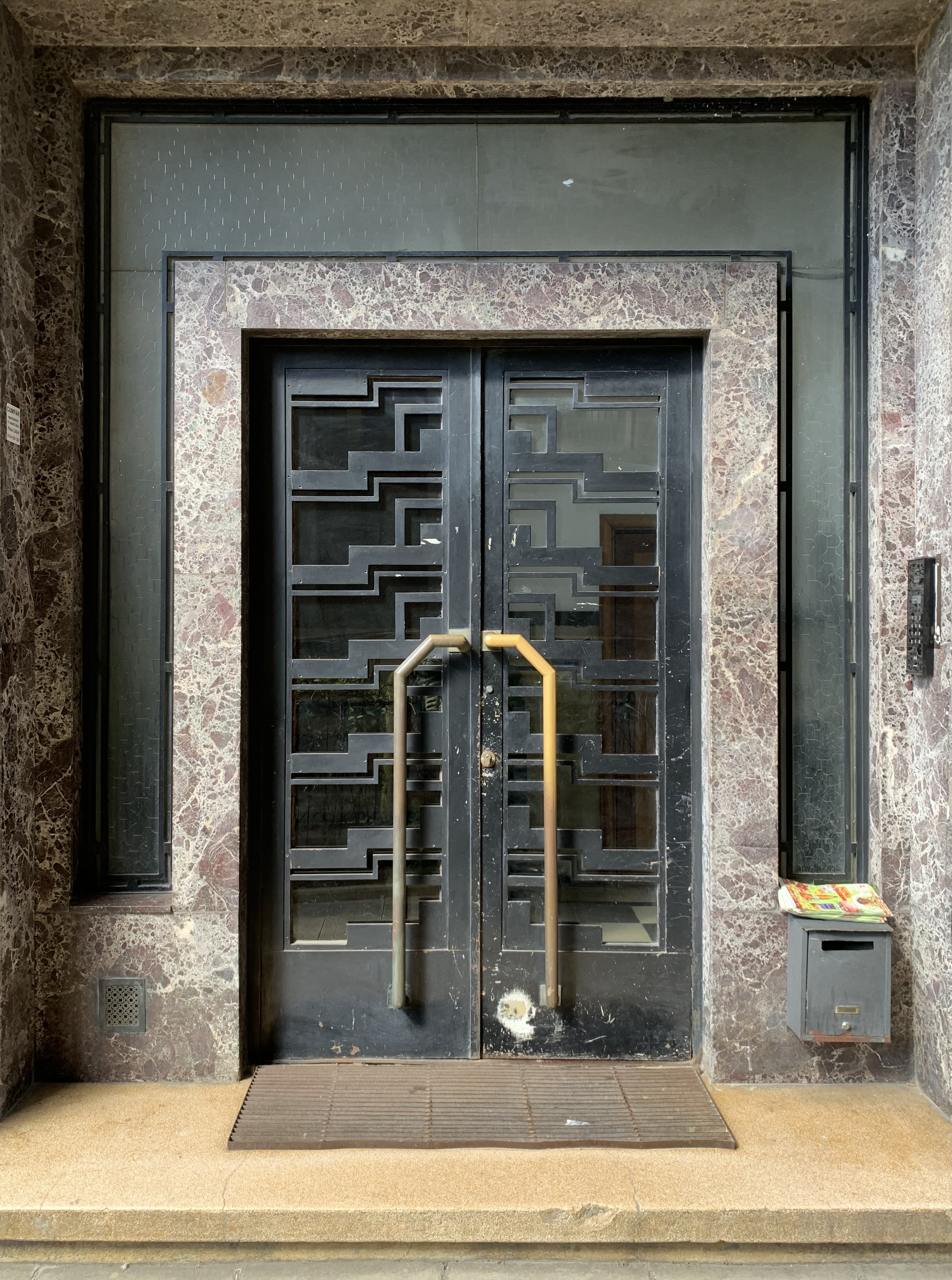
Door of Bulevardul Lascăr Catargiu no. 28, Bucharest, Romania, unknown architect, c.1930

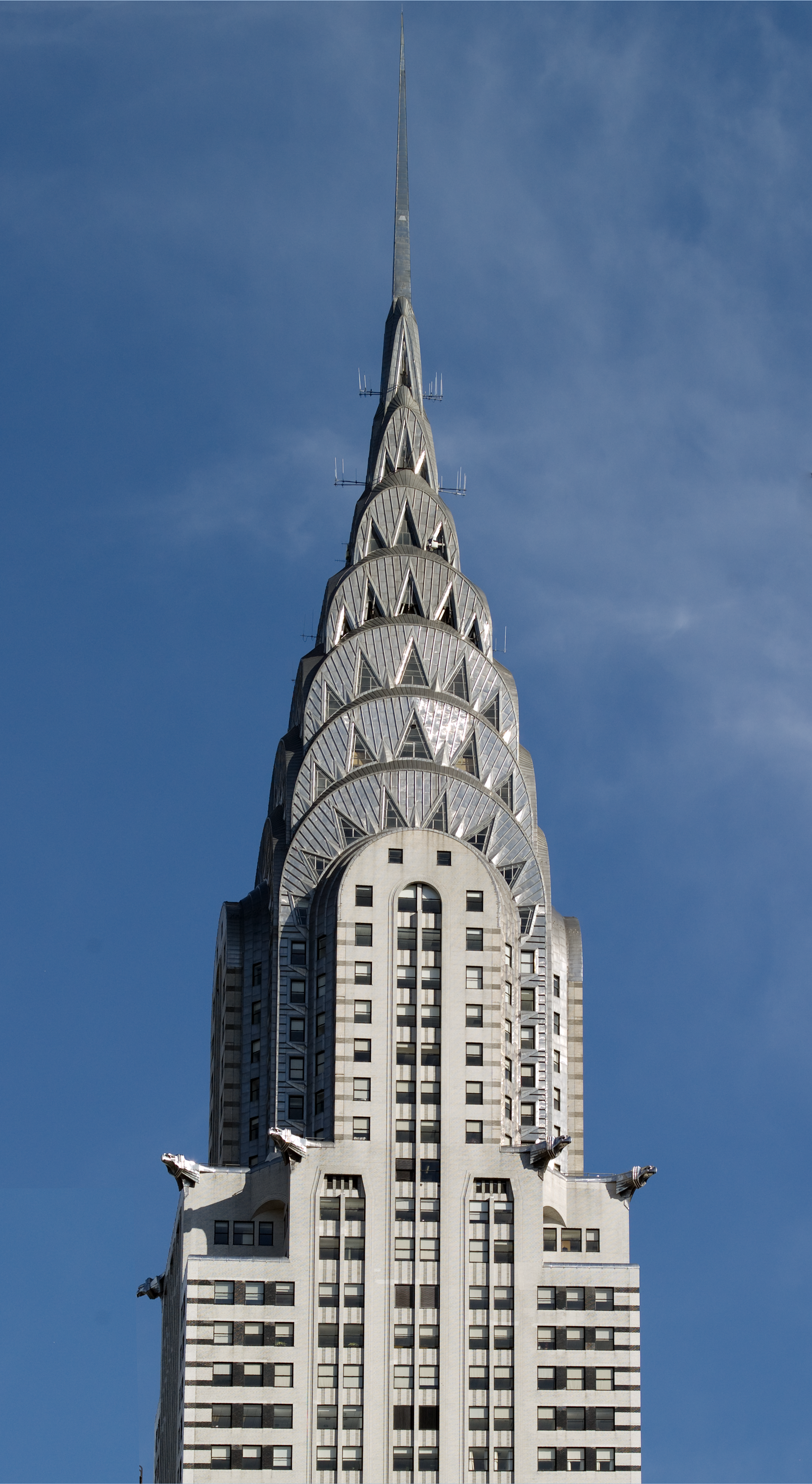
Chrysler Building, New York City, by William Van Allen, 1930

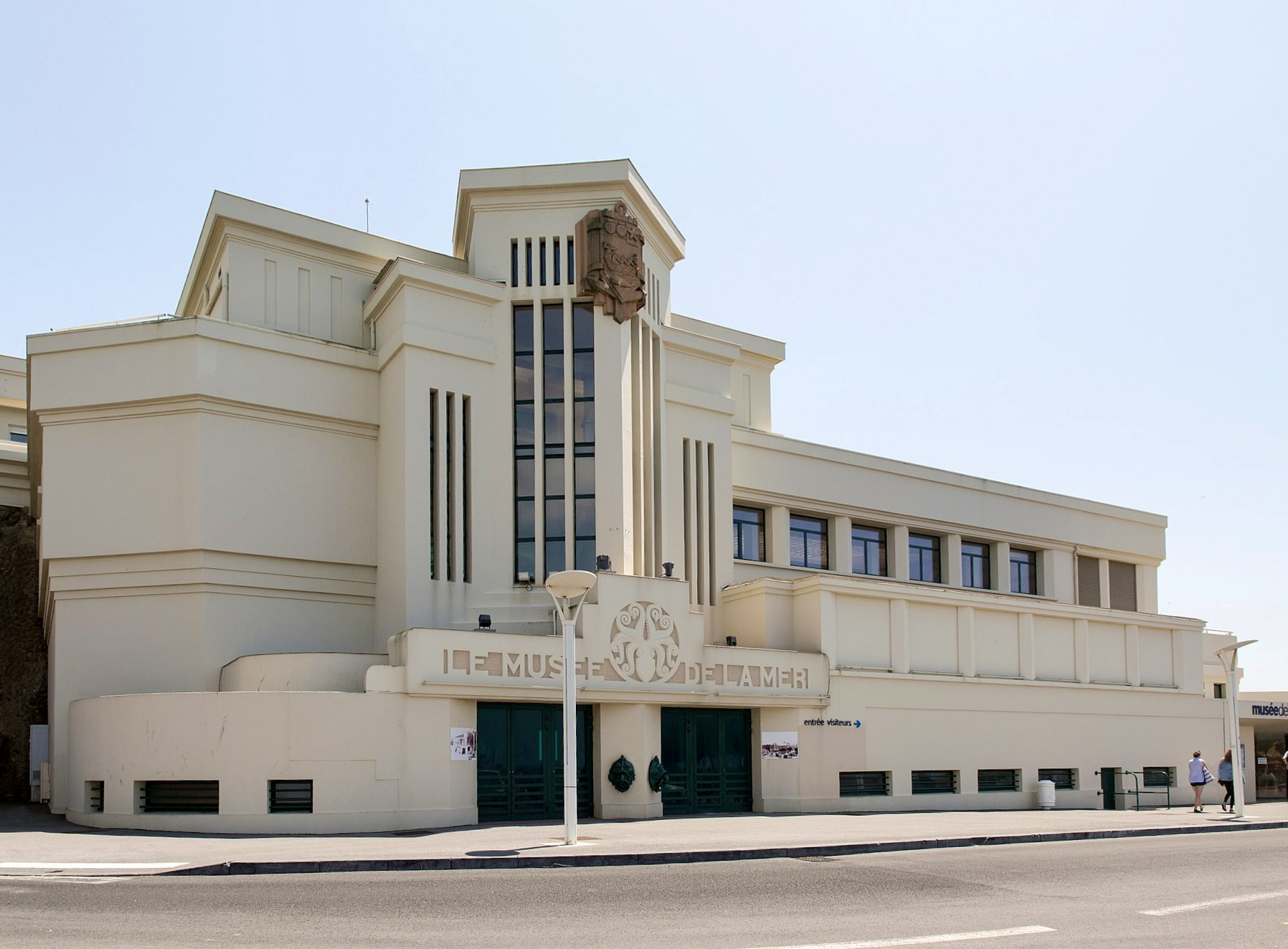
Musée de la Mer, Biarritz, France, by Joseph Hiriart, 1933

Art Deco, named retrospectively after an exhibition held in Paris in 1925, originated in France as a luxurious, highly decorated style. It then spread quickly throughout the world - most dramatically in the United States - becoming more streamlined and modernistic through the 1930s. The style was pervasive and popular, finding its way into the design of everything from jewellery to film sets, from the interiors of ordinary homes to cinemas, luxury streamliners and hotels. Its exuberance and fantasy captured the spirit of the 'roaring 20s' and provided an escape from the realities of the Great Depression during the 1930s.

Although it ended with the start of World War II, its appeal has endured. Despite that it is an example of modern architecture, elements of the style drew on ancient Egyptian, Greek, Roman, African, Aztec and Japanese influences, but also on Futurism, Cubism and the Bauhaus. Bold colours were often applied on low-reliefs. Predominant materials include chrome plating, brass, polished steel and aluminium, inlaid wood, stone and stained glass.

==== International Style ====
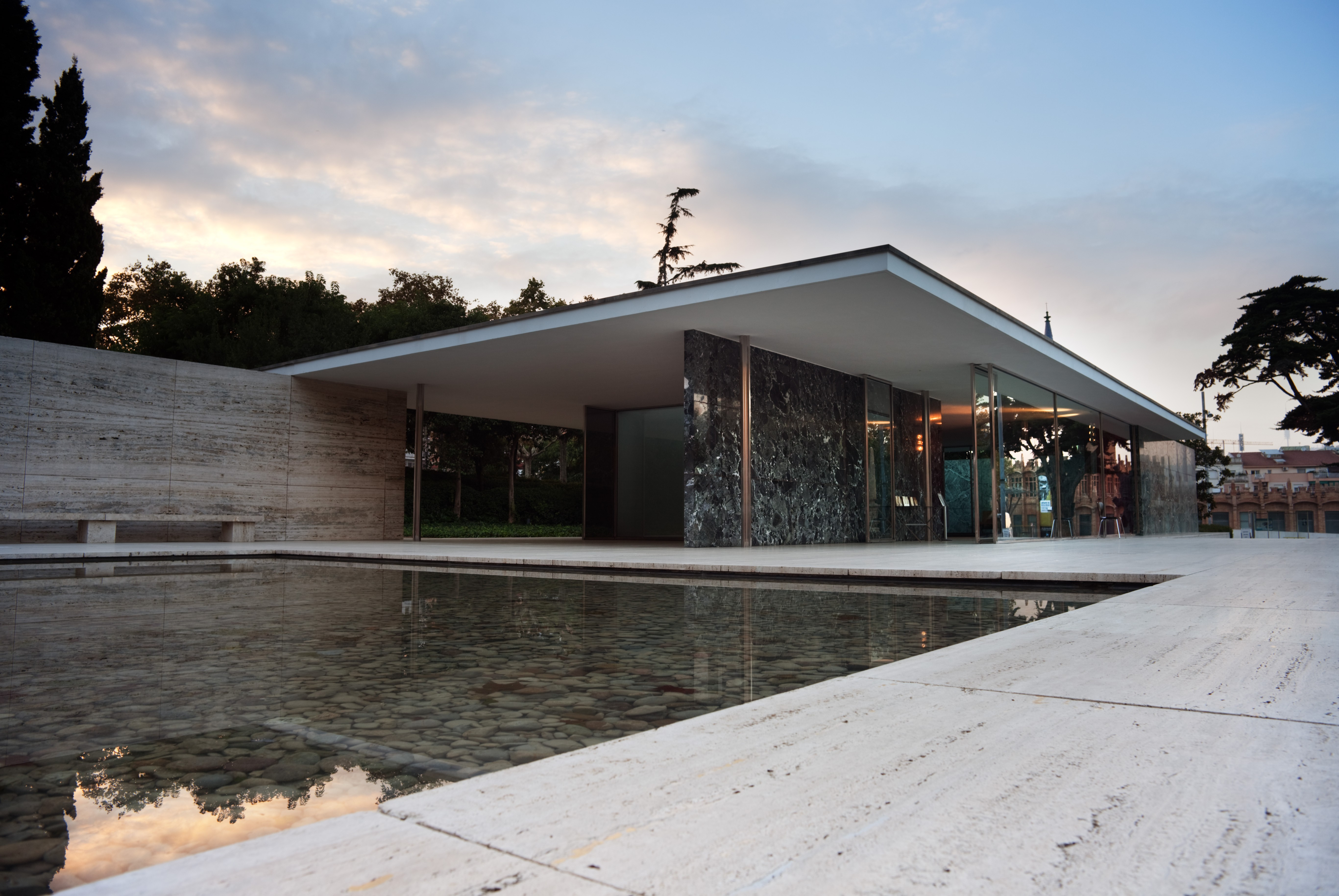
Barcelona Pavilion, Barcelona, Spain, by Ludwig Mies van der Rohe, 1929

Villa Savoye, Poissy, France, by Le Corbusier, 1929-1930

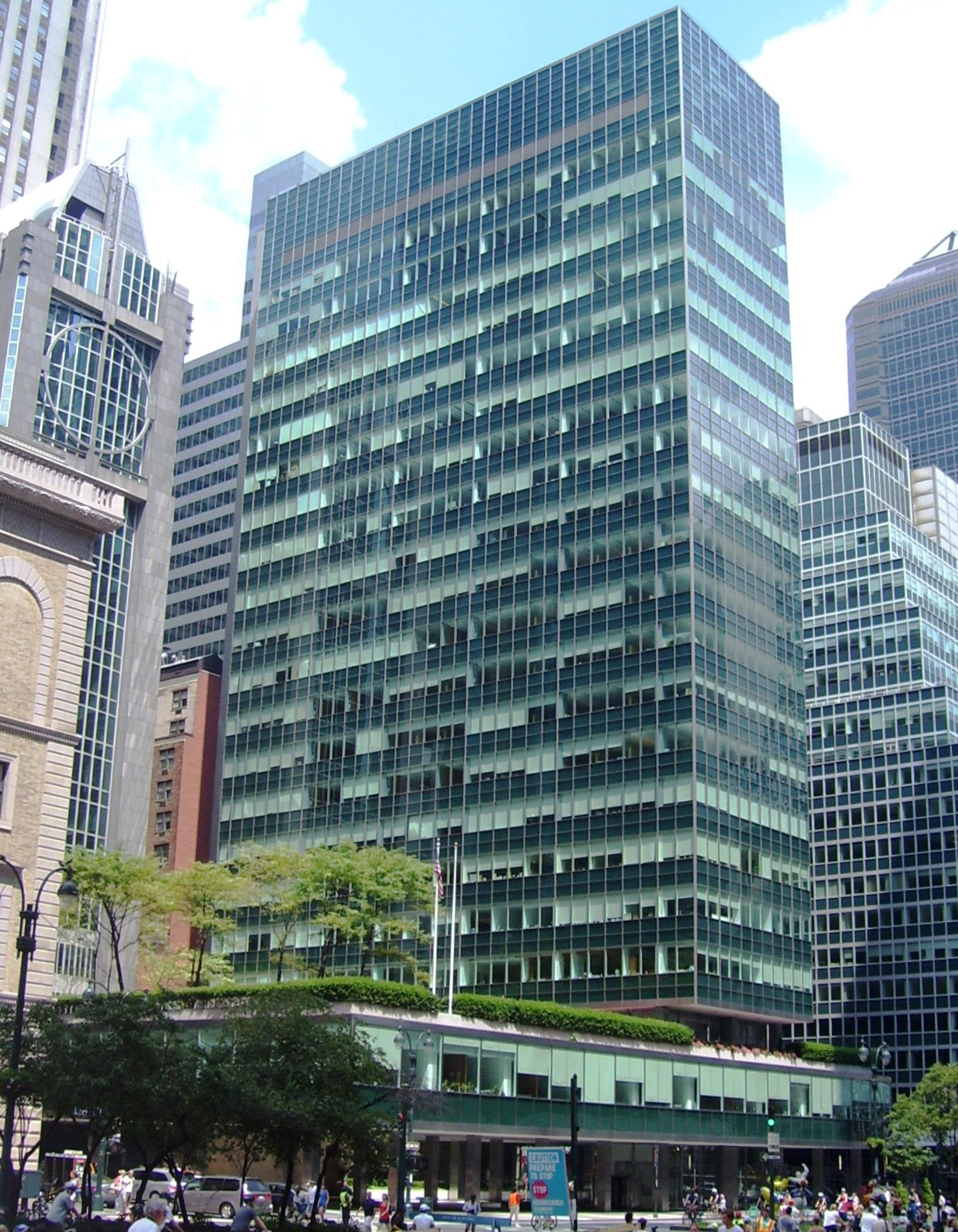
Lever House, New York City, by Skidmore, Owings & Merrill, 1952

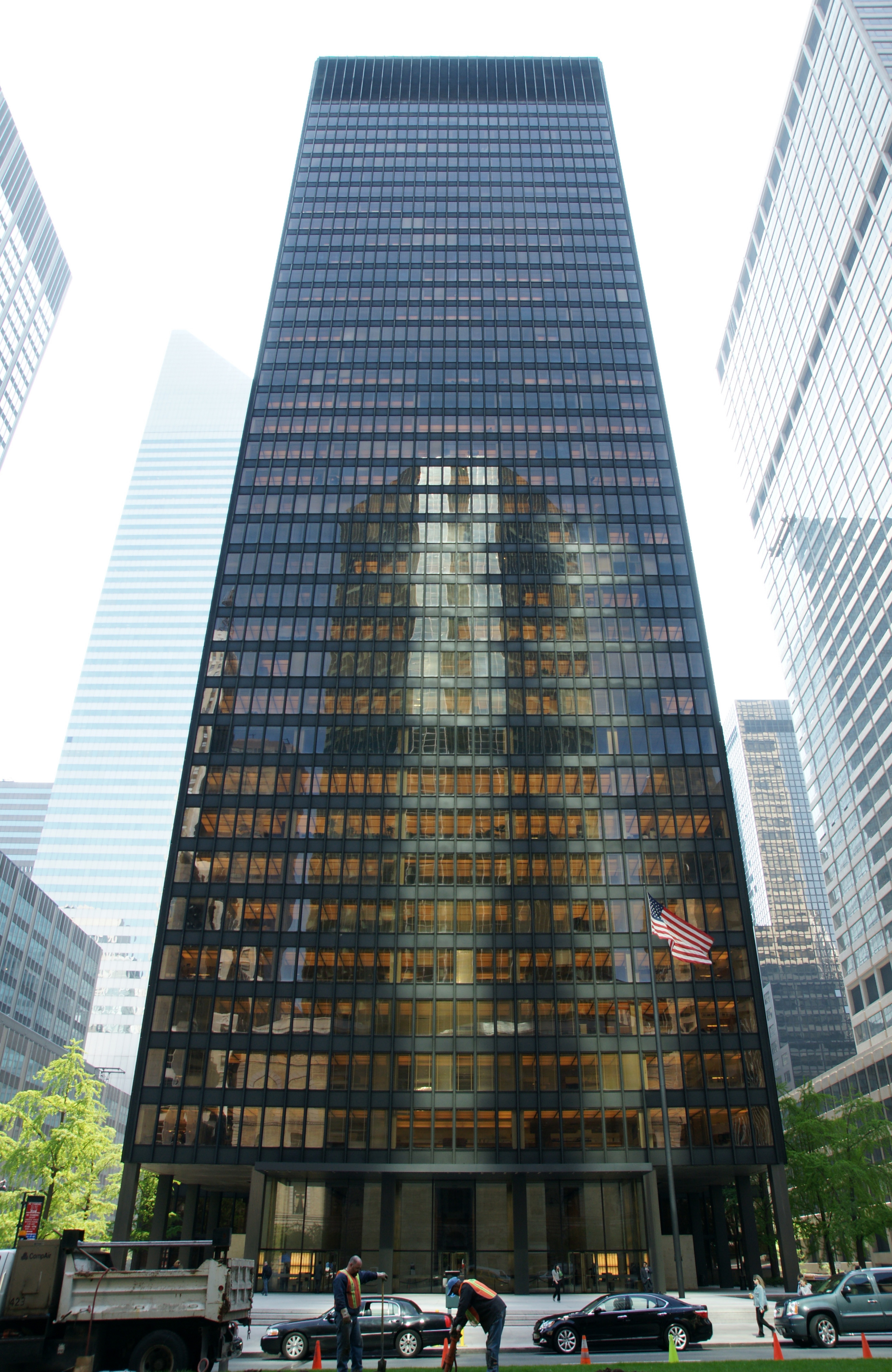
Seagram Building, New York City, by Ludwig Mies van der Rohe, 1958

The International Style emerged in Europe after World War I, influenced by recent movements, including De Stijl and Streamline Moderne, and had a close relationship to the Bauhaus. The antithesis of nearly every other architectural movement that preceded it, the International Style eliminated extraneous ornament and used modern industrial materials such as steel, glass, reinforced concrete and chrome plating. Rectilinear, flat-roofed, asymmetrical and white, it became a symbol of modernity across the world. It seemed to offer a crisp, clean, rational future after the horrors of war. Named by the architect Philip Johnson and historian Henry-Russell Hitchcock (1903–1987) in 1932, the movement was epitomized by Charles-Edouard Jeanneret, or Le Corbusier and was clearly expressed in his statement that 'a house is a machine for living in'.

==== Brutalist ====
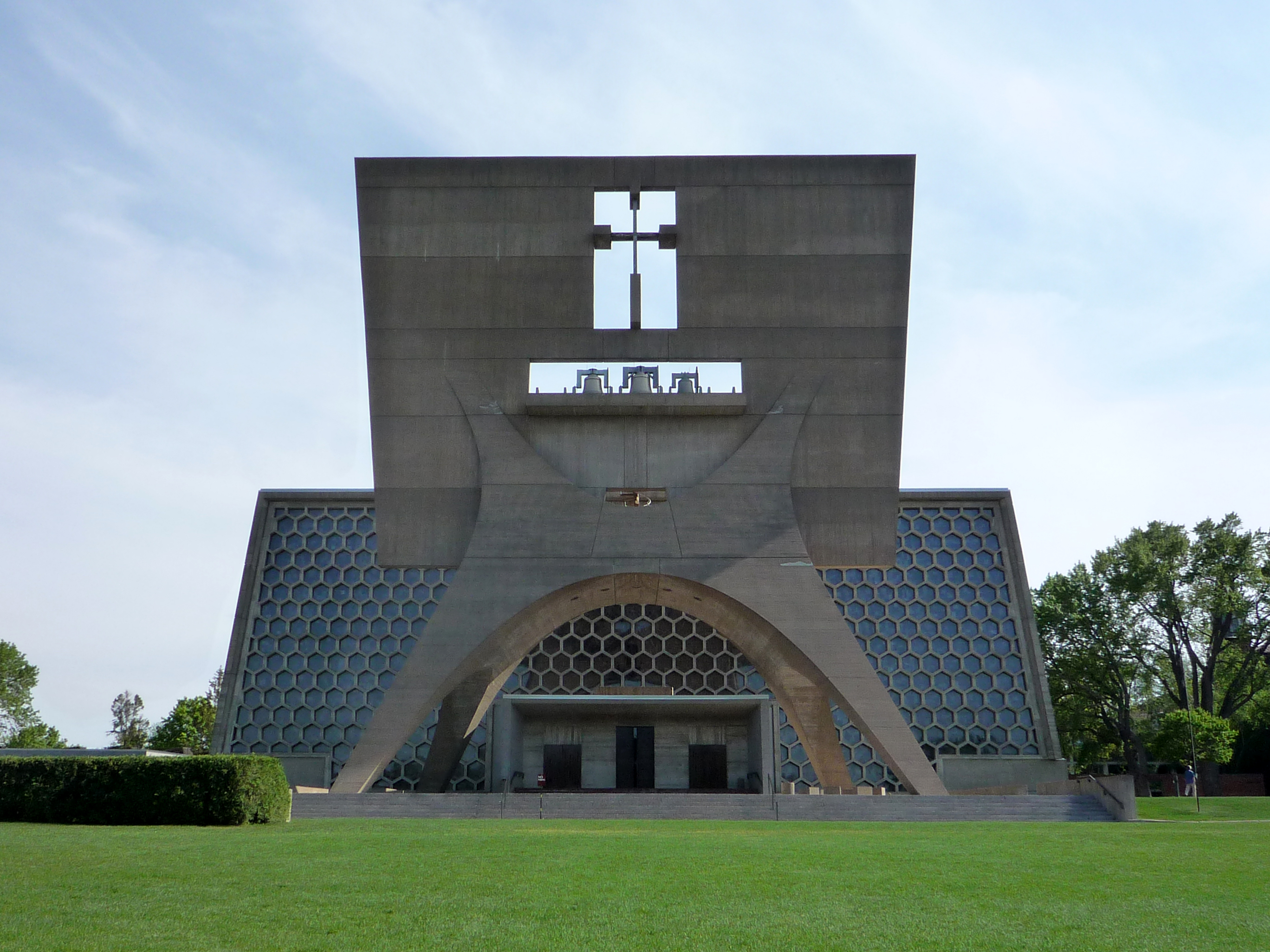
Saint John's Abbey, Collegeville, US, by Marcel Breuer, 1961

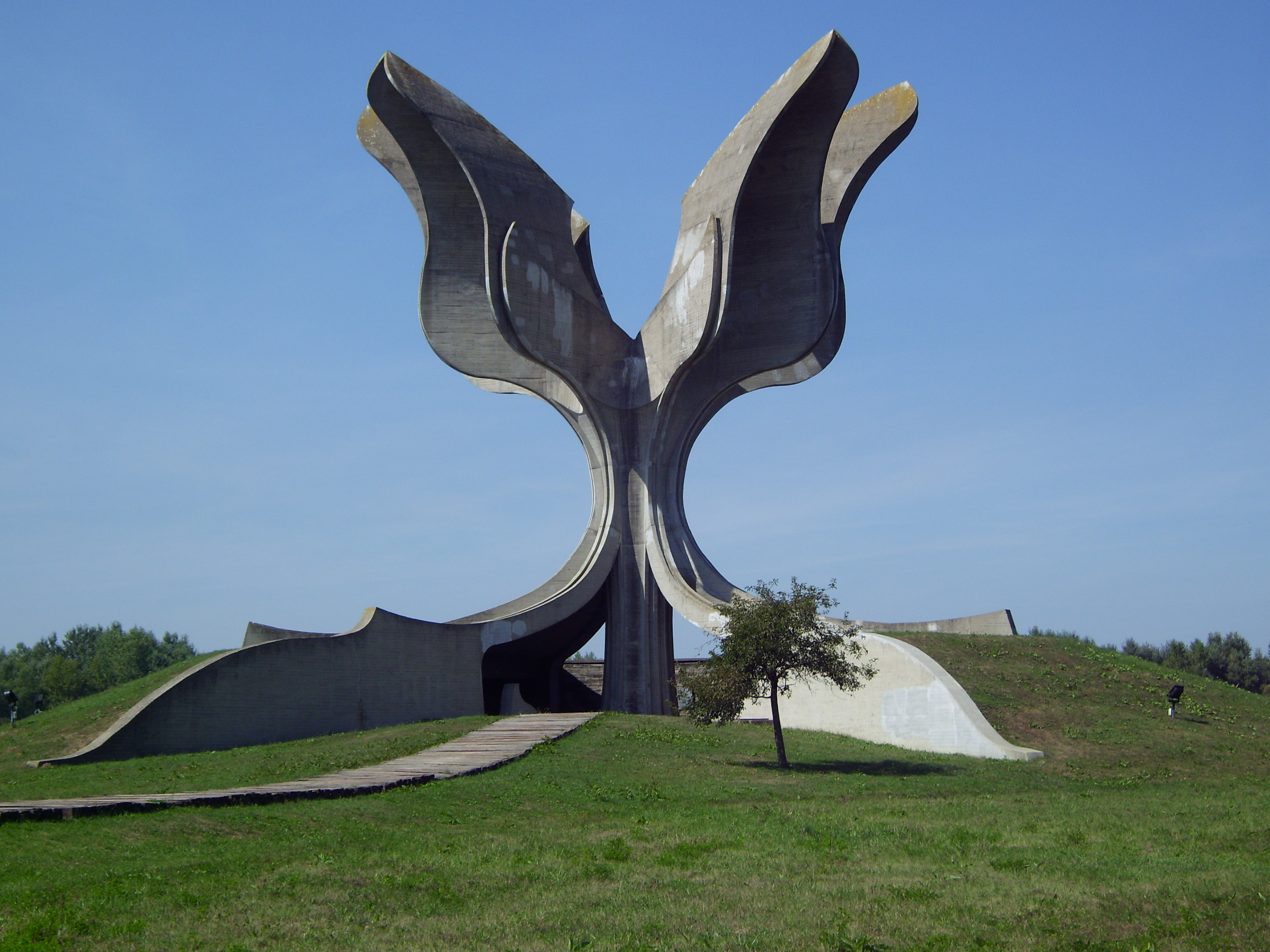
Flower Monument, Jasenovac Memorial Site, Jasenovac, Sisak-Moslavina, Croatia, by Bogdan Bogdanović, 1965

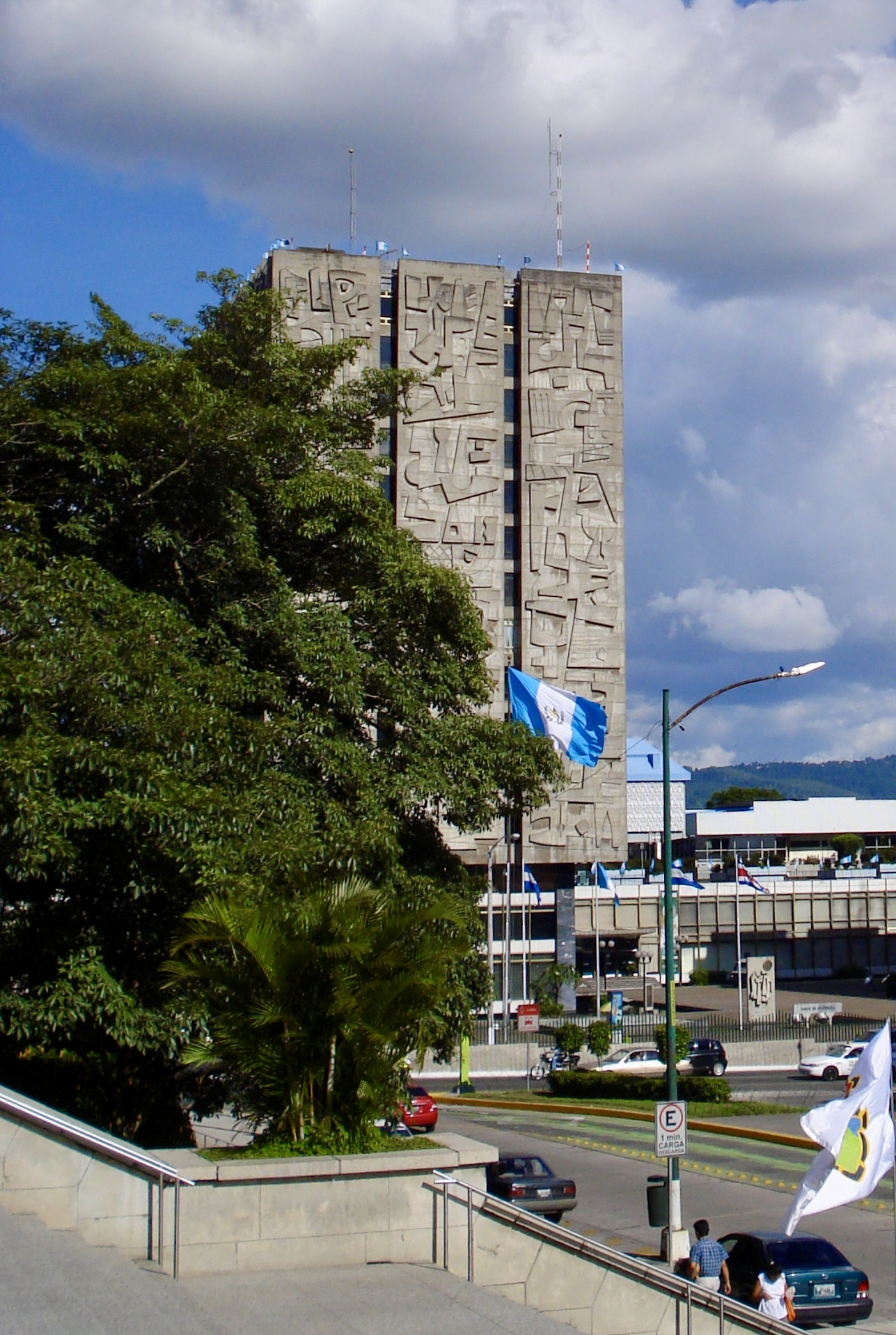
Bank of Guatemala, Guatemala City, Guatemala, by Raúl Minondo Herrera and Jorge Montes Córdova, 1966

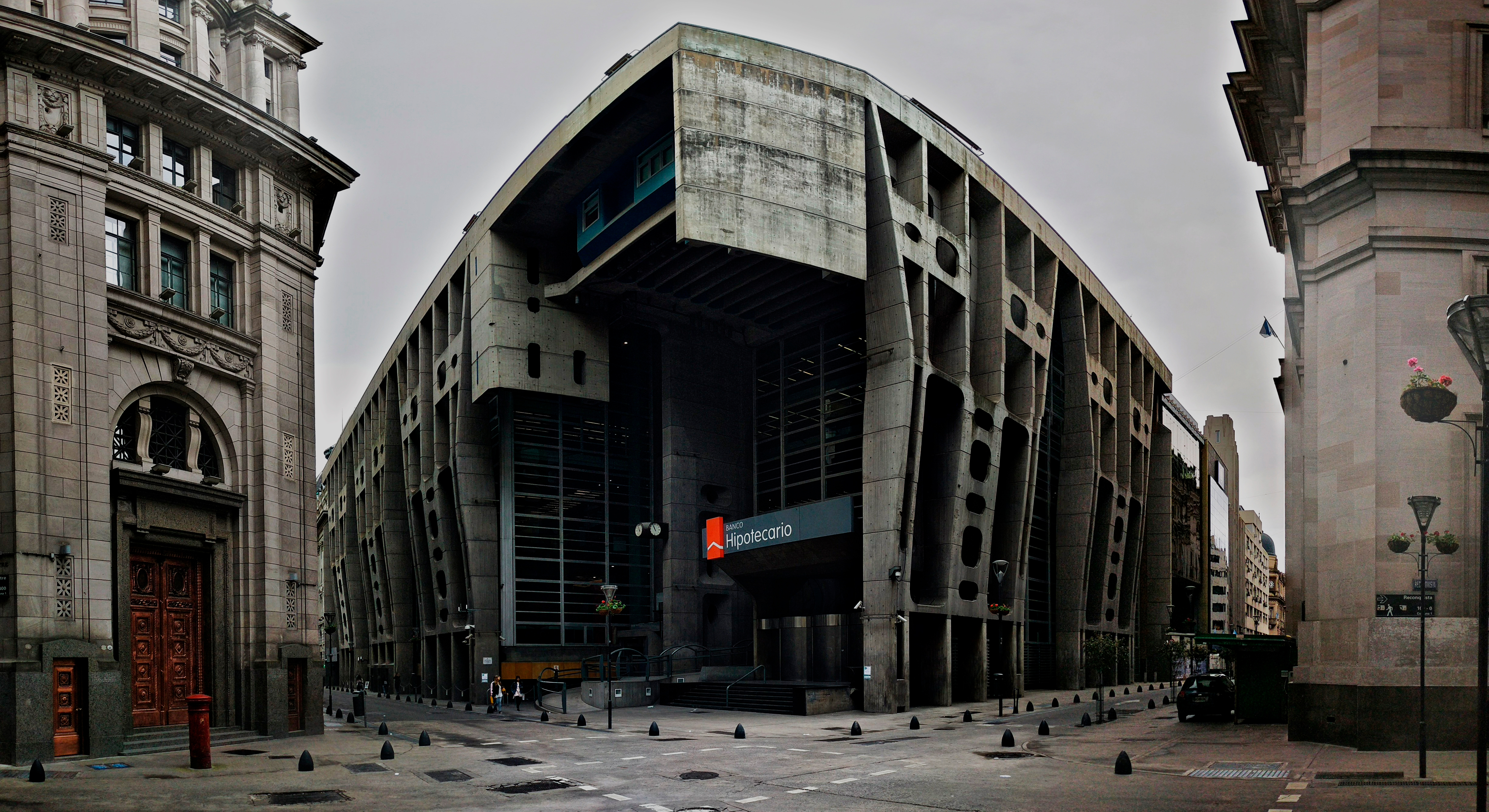
Bank of London and South America Headquarters, Buenos Aires, Argentina, by Clorindo Testa, 1966

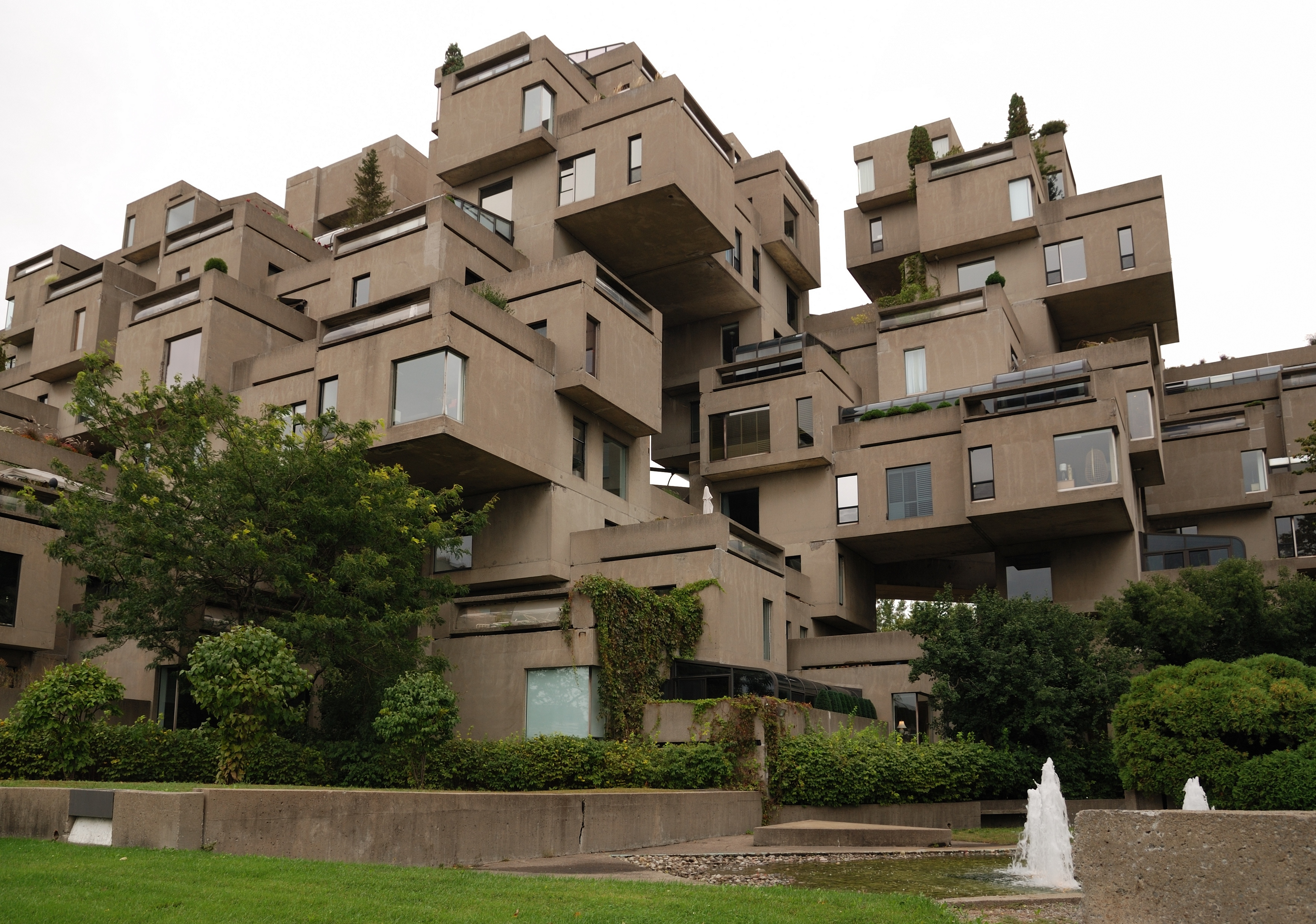
Habitat 67, Montreal, Canada, by Moshe Safdie, 1966–1967

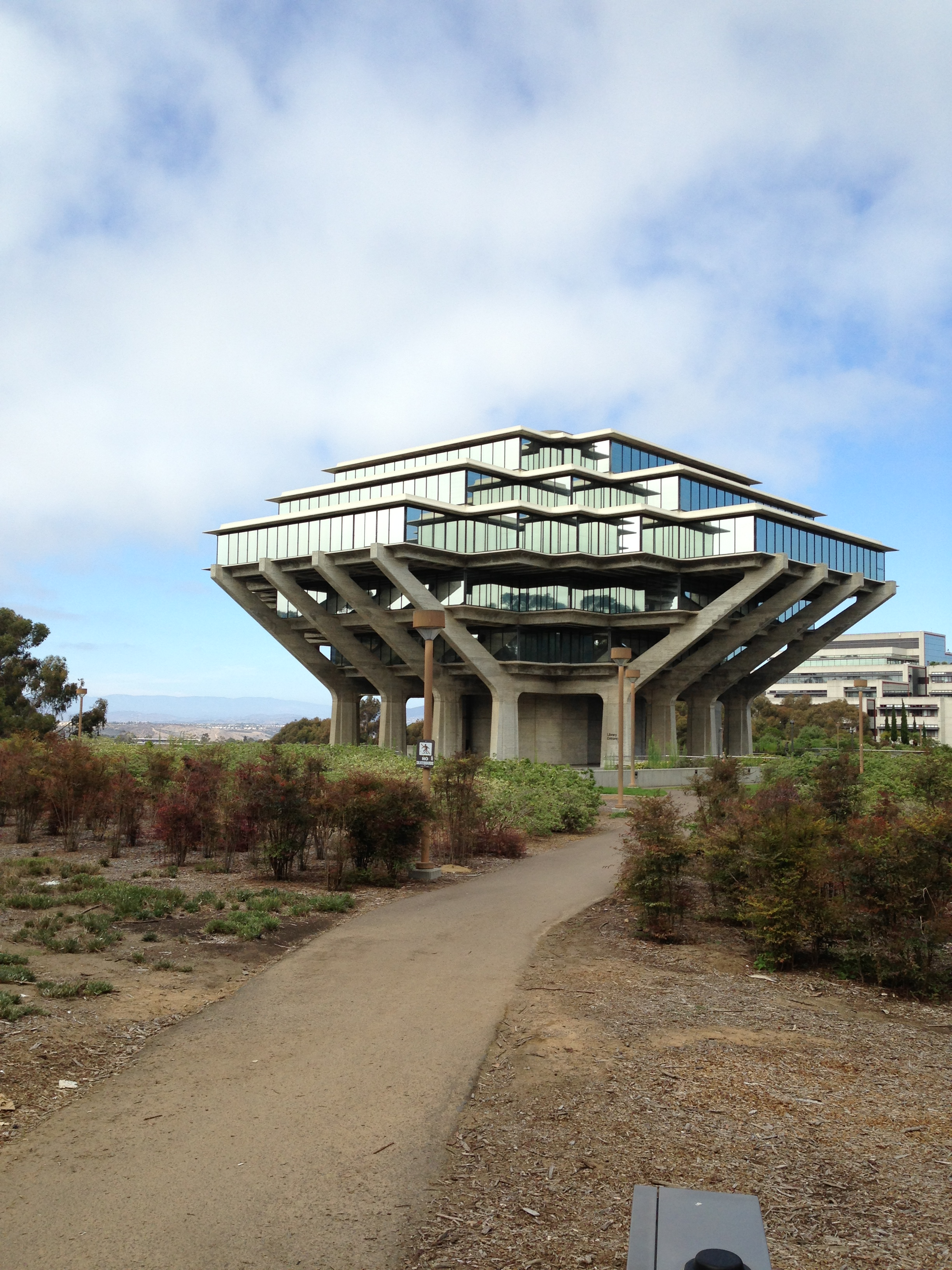
Geisel Library, San Diego, California, US, by William Pereira, 1970

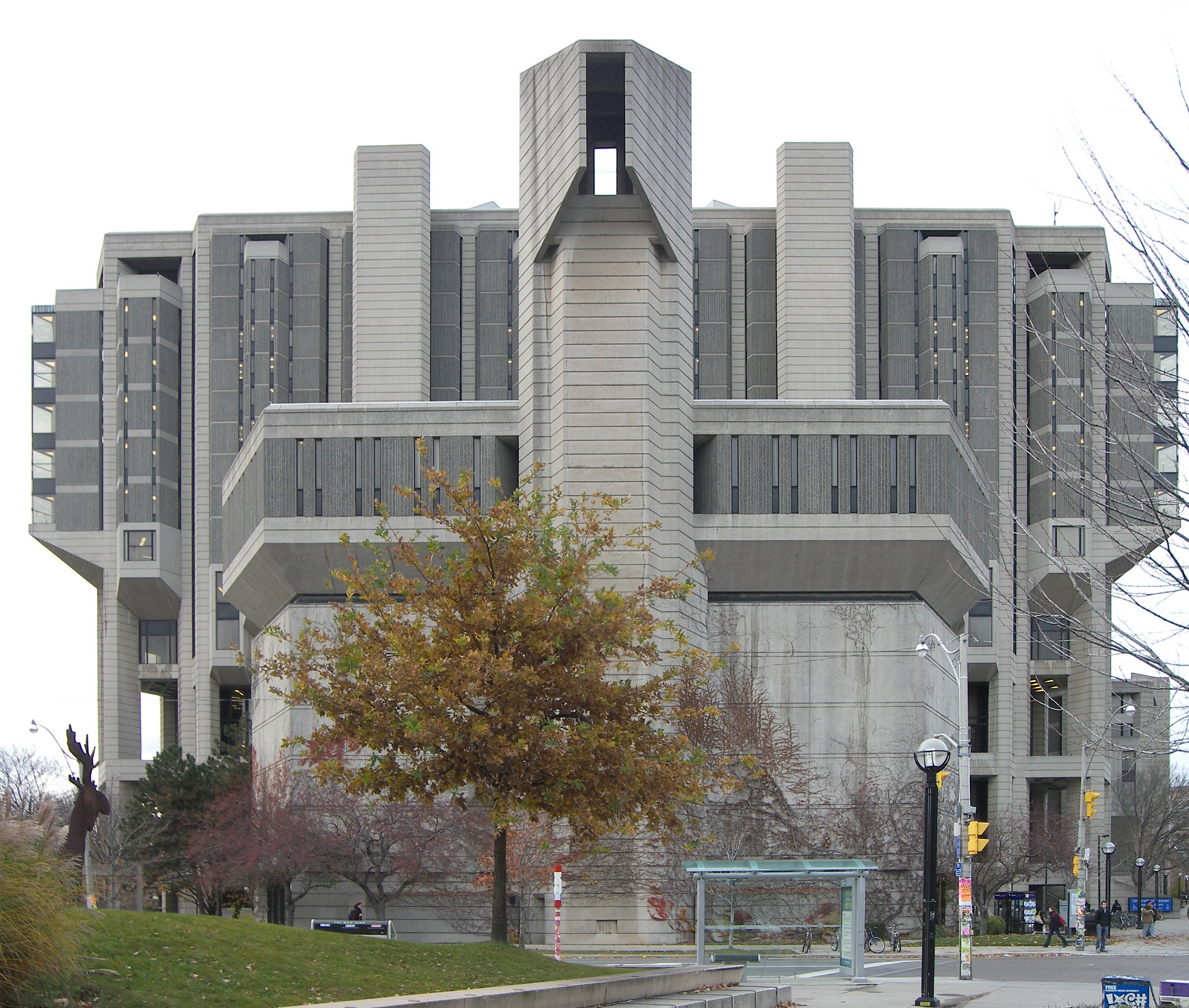
Robarts Library, Toronto, Canada, by Mathers & Halden Architects, 1973

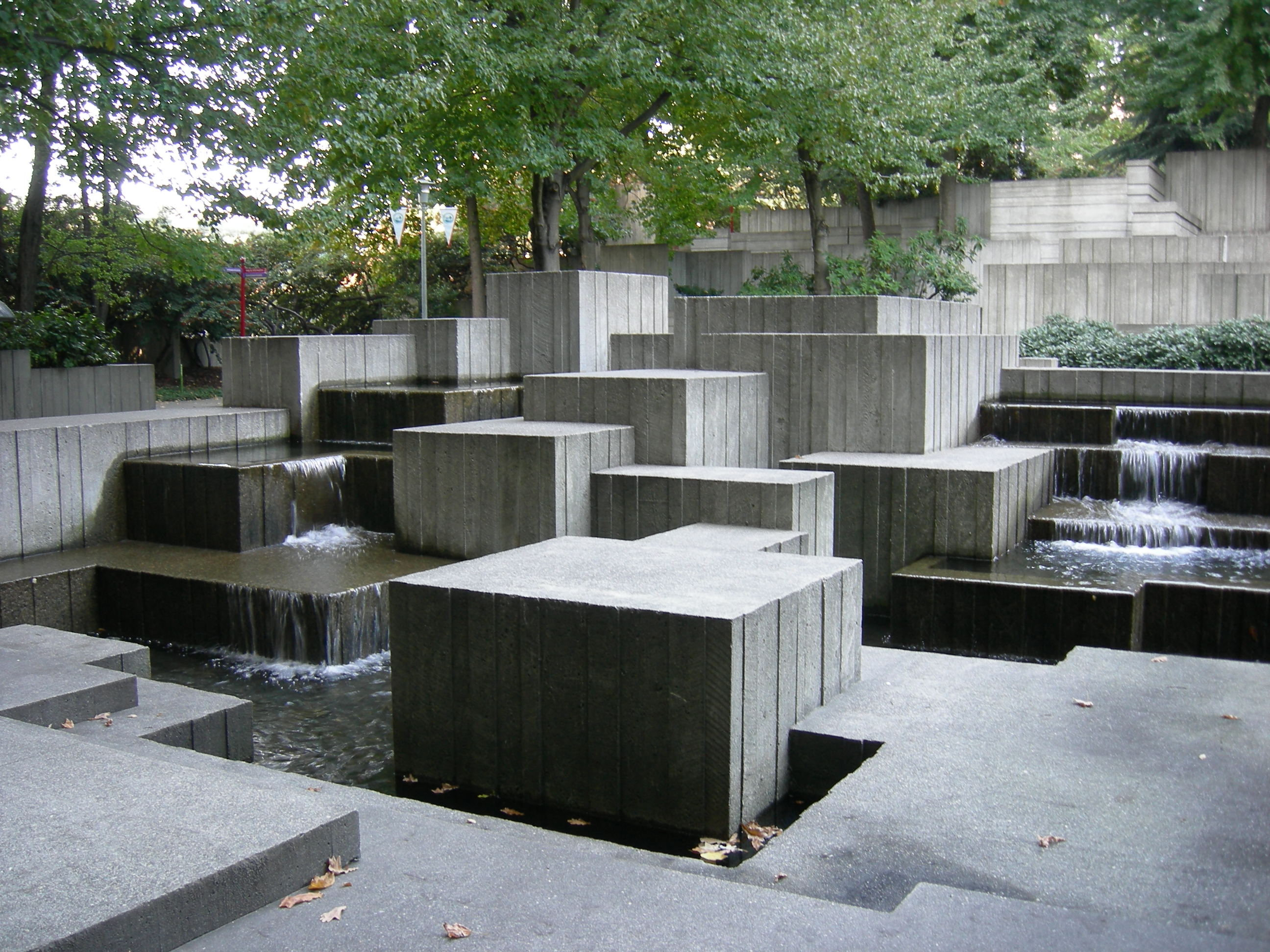
Freeway Park Fountain, Seattle, Washington, US, by Lawrence Halprin, 1976

Supposedly based on social equality, Brutalism was inspired by Le Corbusier's 1947-1952 Unité d'habitation in Marseille. It seems the term was originally coined by Swedish architect Hans Asplund (1921–1994), but Le Corbusier's use of the description béton brut, meaning raw concrete, for his choice of material for the Unité d'habitation was particularly influential. The style flourished from the 1950s to the mid-1970s, mainly using concrete, which although new in itself, was unconventional when exposed on facades. Before Brutalism, concrete was usually hidden beneath other materials.

=== Postmodern ===
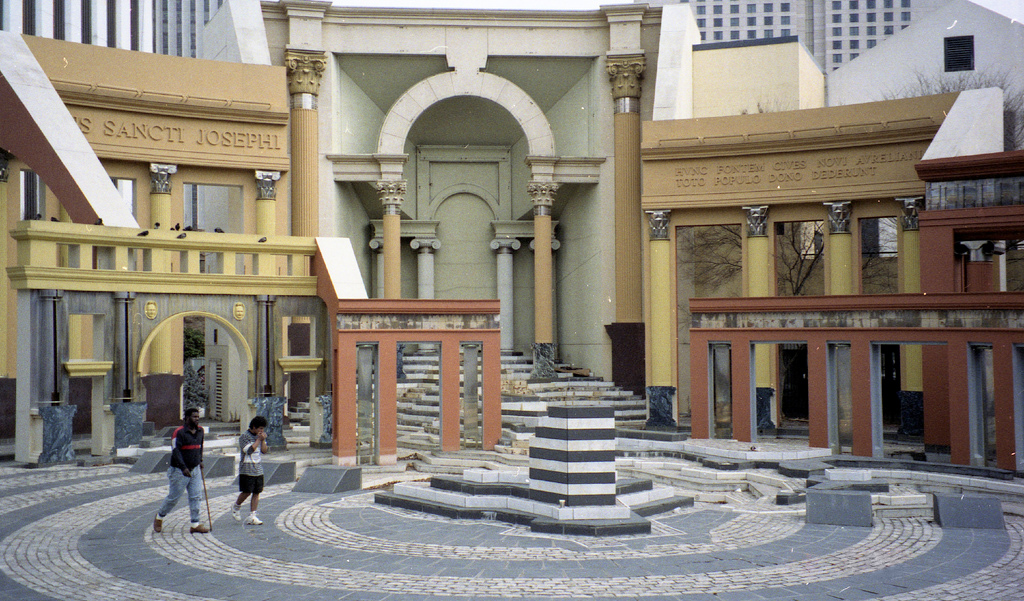
Piazza d'Italia, New Orleans, USA, by Charles Moore, 1978

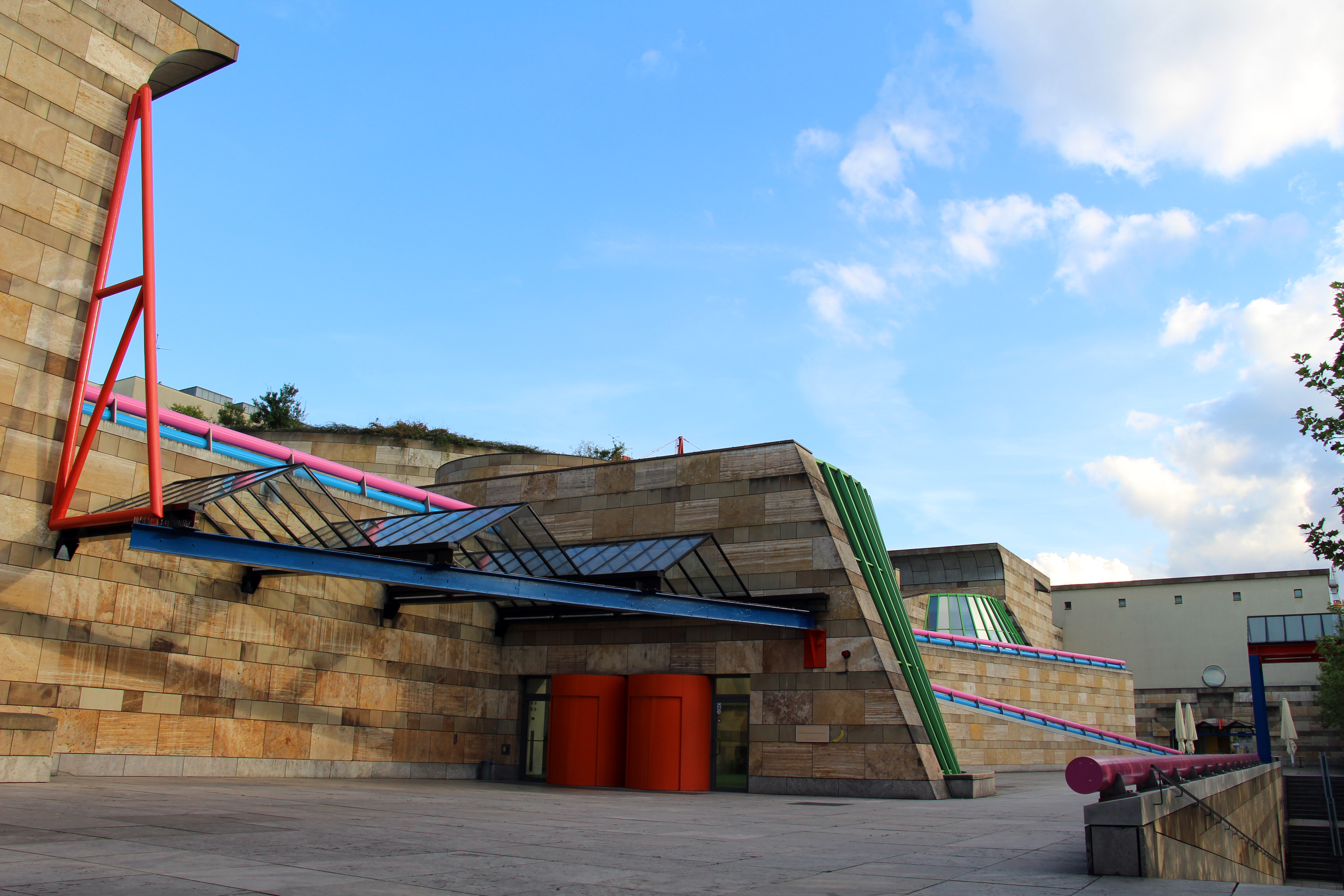
Neue Staatsgalerie, Stuttgart, Germany, by James Stirling, 1984

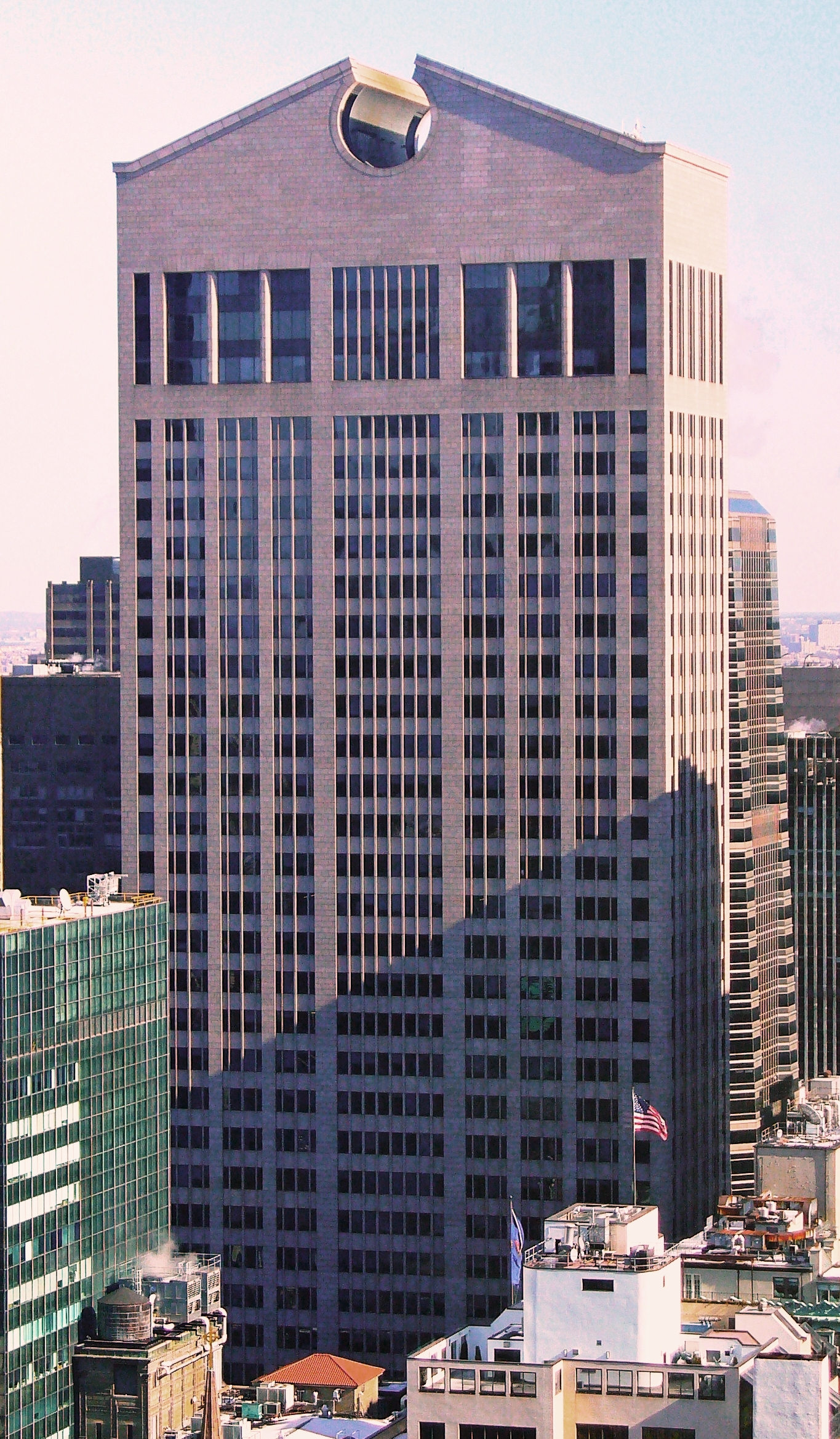
AT&T Headquarters, New York City, by Philip Johnson and John Burgee, 1984

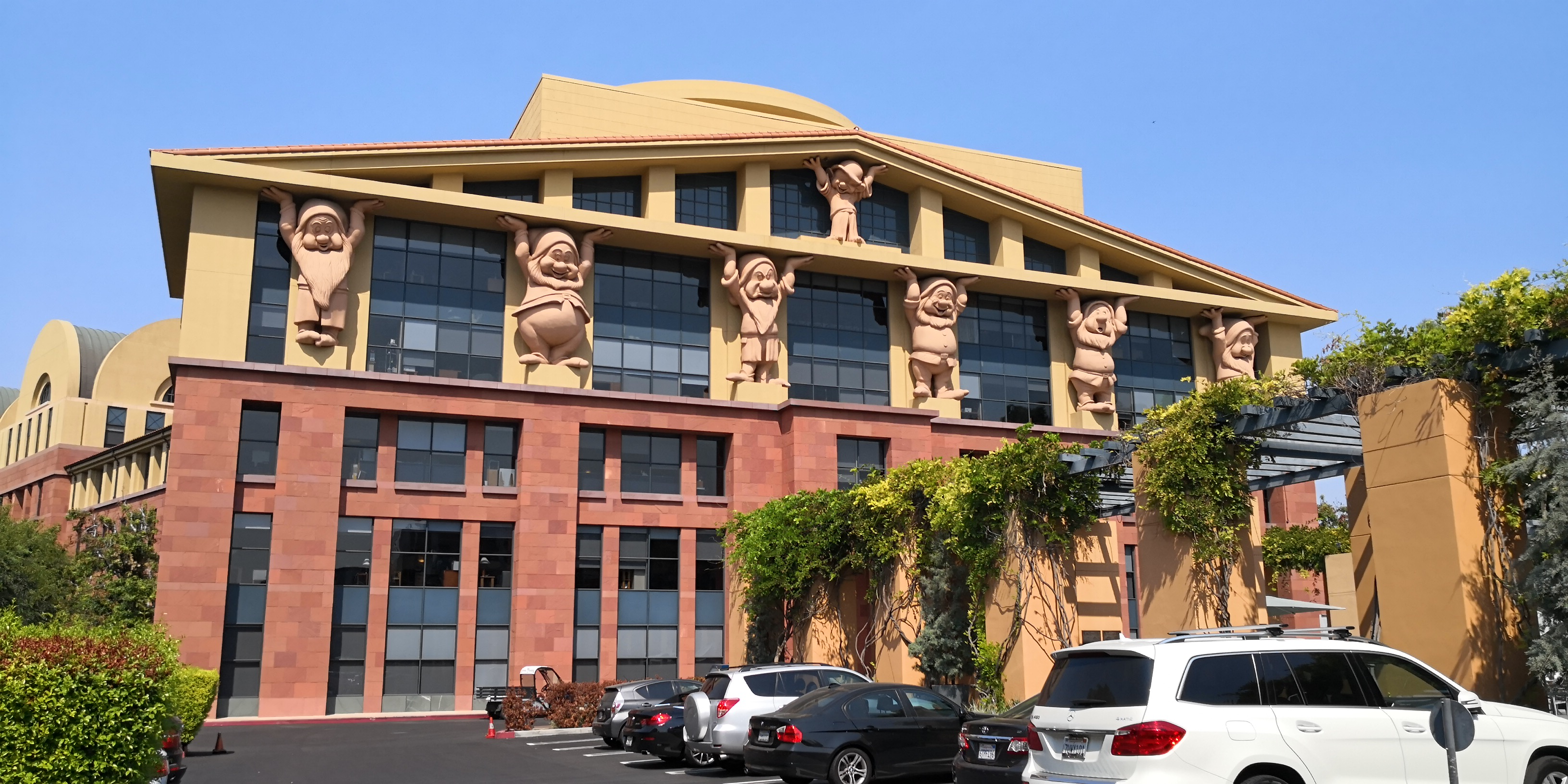
Team Disney Building, Los Angeles, USA, by Michael Graves, 1990

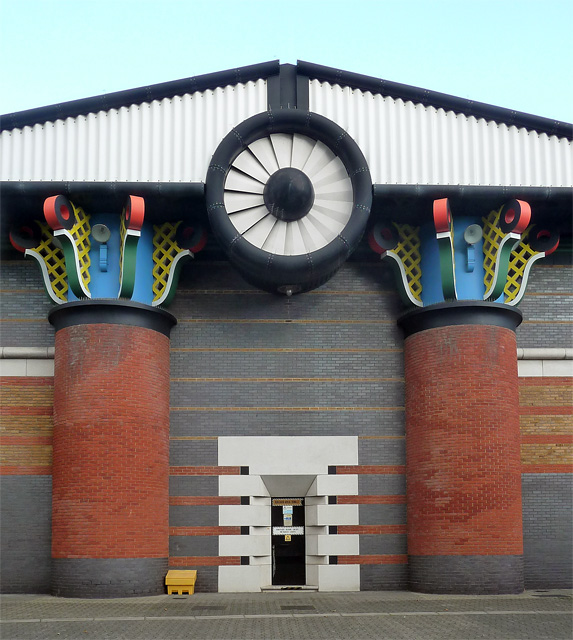
Isle of Dogs Pumping Station, London, John Outram, 1988

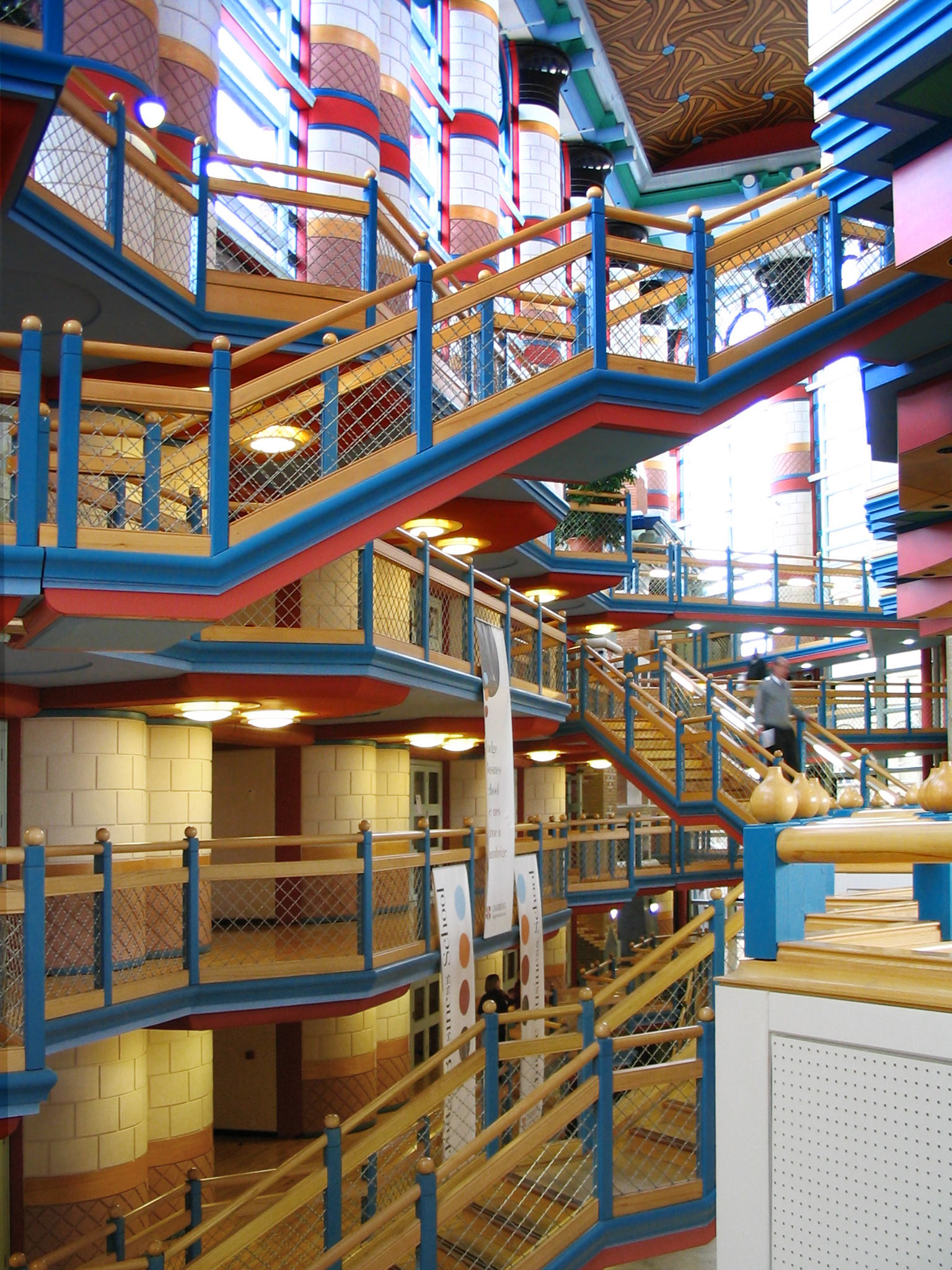
Multicolour interior of the Cambridge Judge Business School, Cambridge, UK, by John Outram, 1995

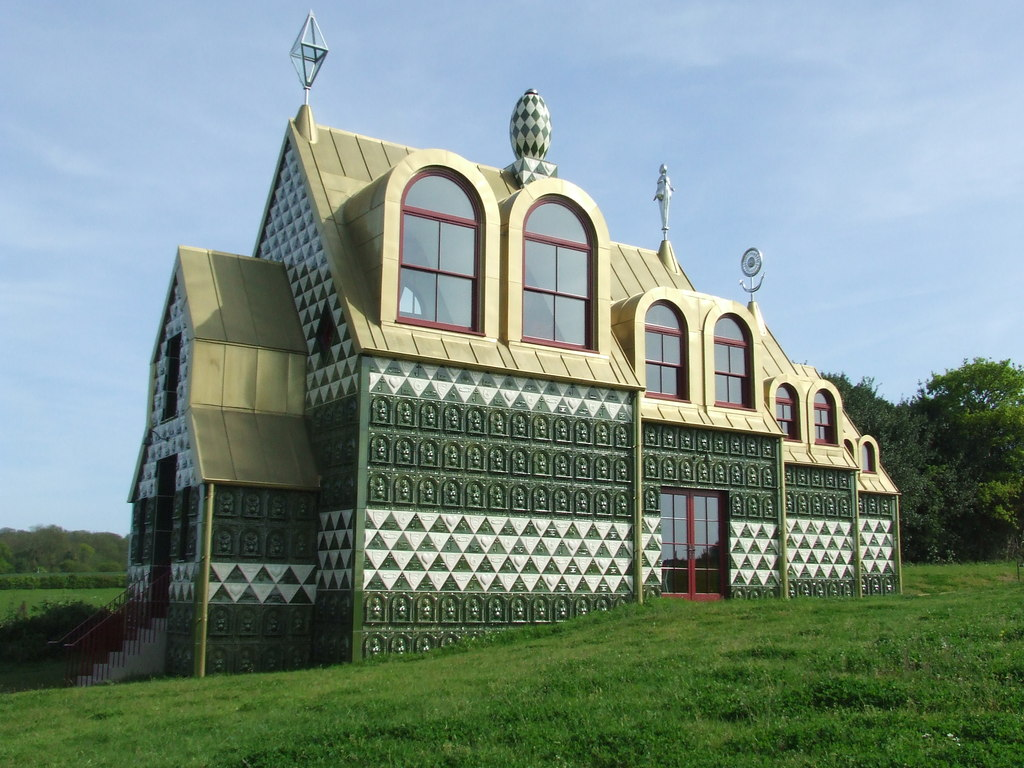
House for Essex, Wrabness, Essex, UK, by FAT and Grayson Perry, 2014

Not one definable style, Postmodernism is an eclectic mix of approaches that appeared in the late 20th century in reaction against Modernism, which was increasingly perceived as monotonous and conservative. As with many movements, a complete antithesis to Modernism developed. In 1966, the architect Robert Venturi (1925–2018) had published his book, Complexity and Contradiction in Architecture, which praised the originality and creativity of Mannerist and Baroque architecture of Rome, and encouraged more ambiguity and complexity in contemporary design. Complaining about the austerity and tedium of so many smooth steel and glass Modernist buildings, and in deliberate denunciation of the famous Modernist 'Less is more', Venturi stated 'Less is a bore'. His theories became a majore influence on the development of Postmodernism.

==== Deconstructivist ====
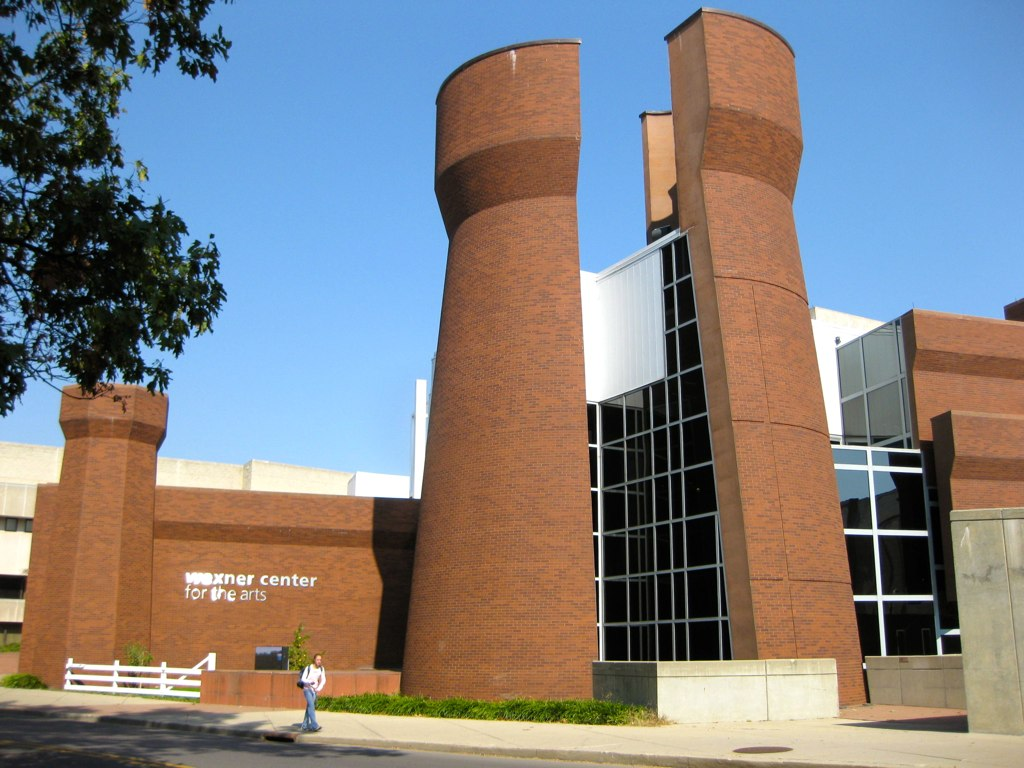
Wexner Center for the Arts, Ohio State University, Columbus, Ohio, US, by Peter Eisenman, 1989

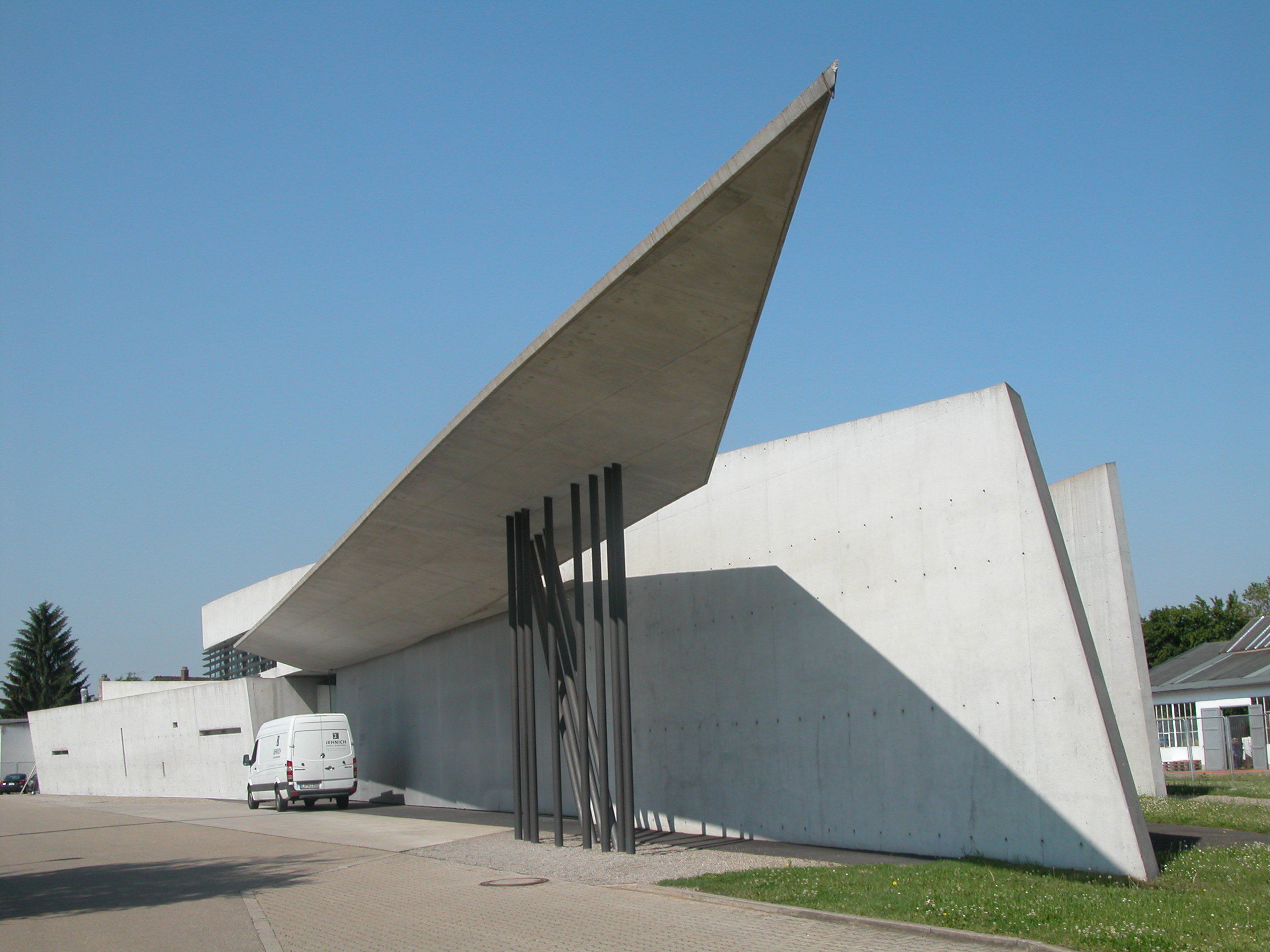
Vitra Fire Station, Weil am Rhein, Germany, by Zaha Hadid, 1989–1993

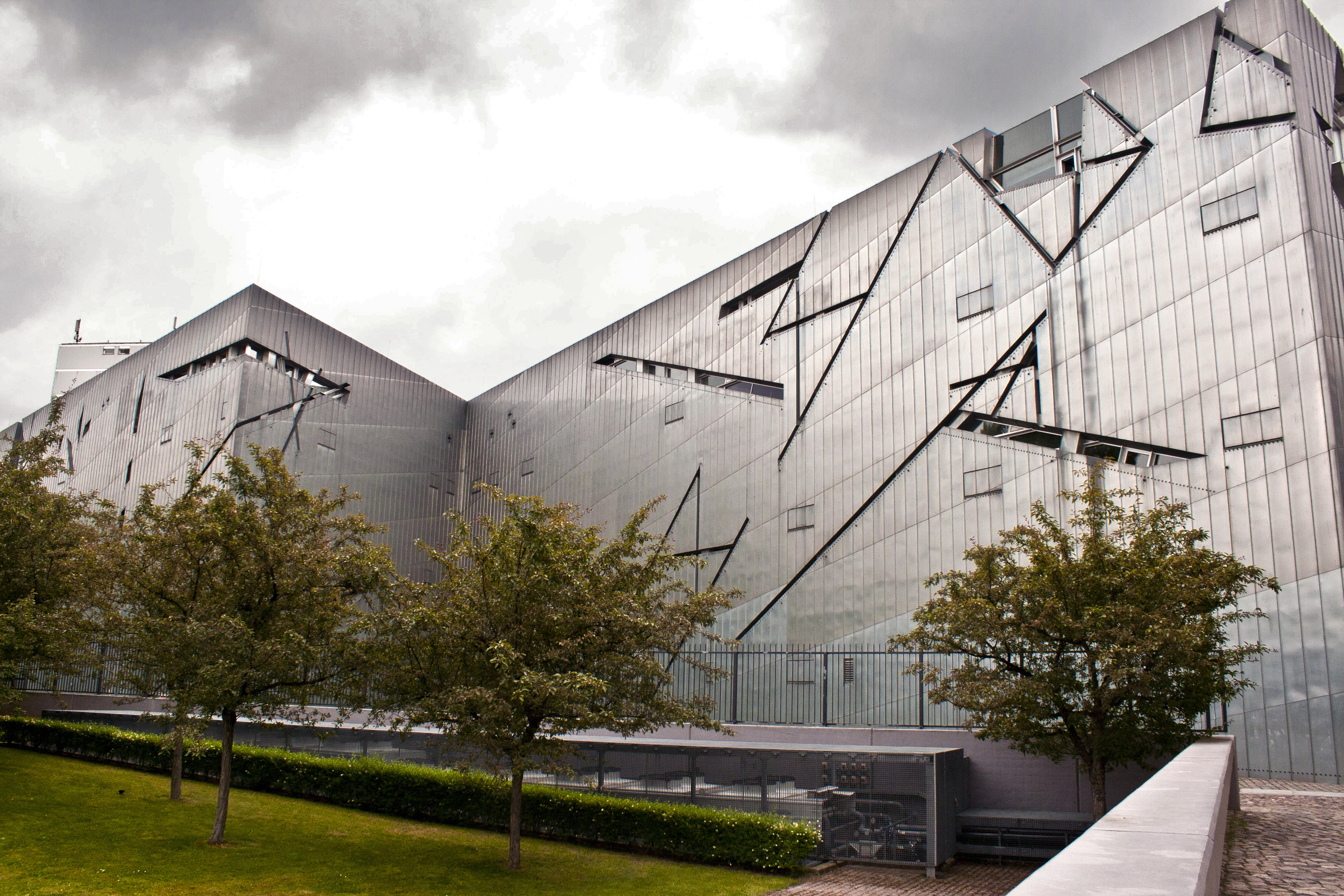
Jewish Museum, Berlin, Germany, by Daniel Libeskind, 1992–1999

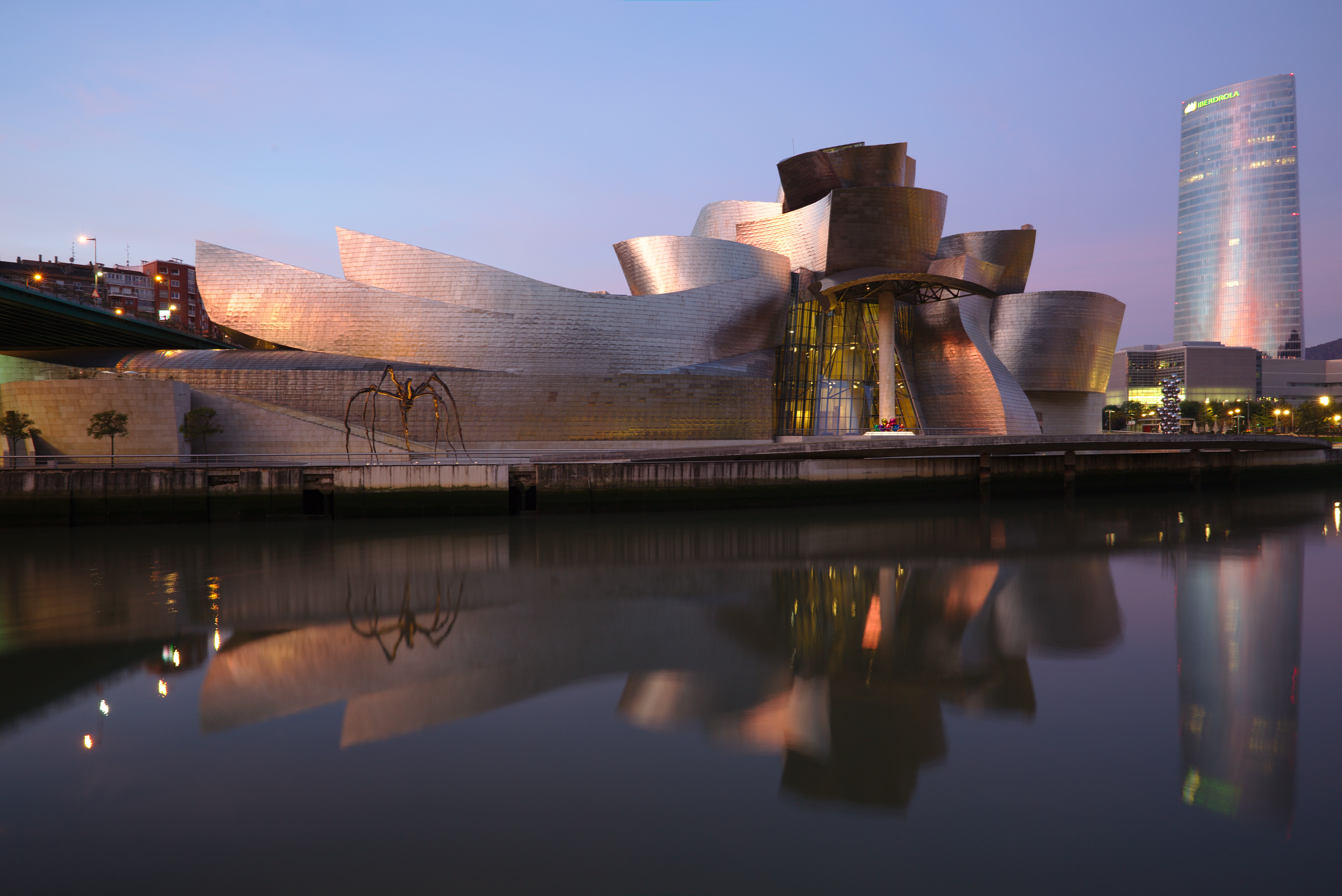
Guggenheim Museum, Bilbao, Spain, by Frank Gehry, opened in 1997

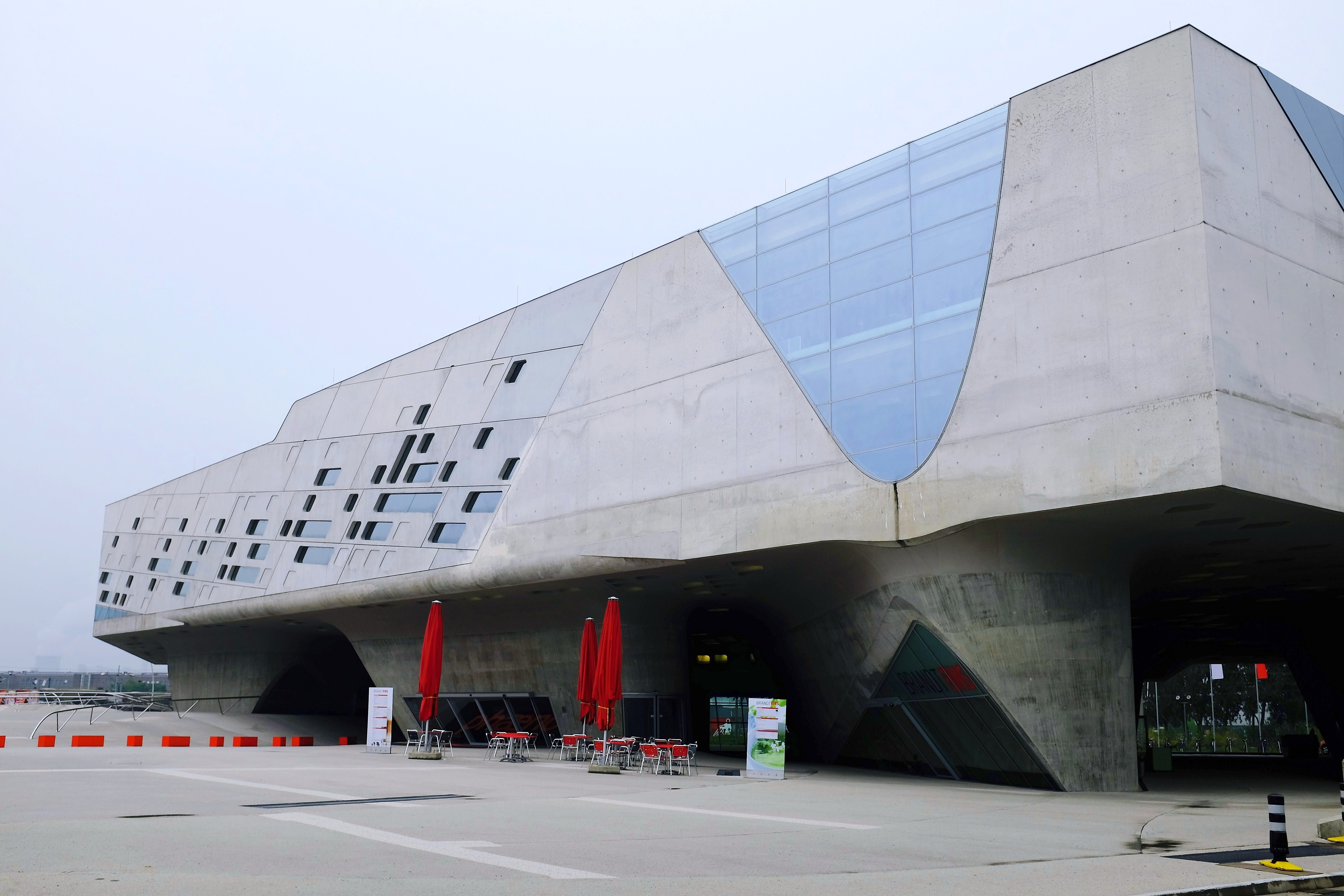
Phaeno Science Center, Wolfsburg, Germany, by Zaha Hadid, 2005

Deconstructivism in architecture is a development of postmodern architecture that began in the late 1980s. It is characterized by ideas of fragmentation, non-linear processes of design, an interest in manipulating ideas of a structure's surface or skin, and apparent non-Euclidean geometry, (i.e., non-rectilinear shapes) which serve to distort and dislocate some of the elements of architecture, such as structure and envelope. The finished visual appearance of buildings that exhibit the many deconstructivist "styles" is characterised by a stimulating unpredictability and a controlled chaos.

Important events in the history of the Deconstructivist movement include the 1982 Parc de la Villette architectural design competition (especially the entry from the French philosopher Jacques Derrida and the American architect Peter Eisenman and Bernard Tschumi's winning entry), the Museum of Modern Art's 1988 Deconstructivist Architecture exhibition in New York, organized by Philip Johnson and Mark Wigley, and the 1989 opening of the Wexner Center for the Arts in Columbus, designed by Peter Eisenman. The New York exhibition featured works by Frank Gehry, Daniel Libeskind, Rem Koolhaas, Peter Eisenman, Zaha Hadid, Coop Himmelblau, and Bernard Tschumi. Since the exhibition, many of the architects who were associated with Deconstructivism have distanced themselves from the term. Nonetheless, the term has stuck and has now, in fact, come to embrace a general trend within contemporary architecture.

=== Contemporary architecture ===
Contemporary architecture is the architecture of the 21st century. No single style is dominant. Contemporary architects work in several different styles, from postmodernism, high-tech architecture and new references and interpretations of traditional architecture like New Classical architecture to highly conceptual forms and designs, resembling sculpture on an enormous scale. Some of these styles and approaches make use of very advanced technology and modern building materials, such as tube structures which allow construction of buildings that are taller, lighter and stronger than those in the 20th century, while others prioritize the use of natural and ecological materials like stone, wood and lime. One technology that is common to all forms of contemporary architecture is the use of new techniques of computer-aided design, which allow buildings to be designed and modeled on computers in three dimensions, and constructed with more precision and speed.

== See also ==
- History of architectural engineering
- Outline of architecture
- Timeline of architecture
- Timeline of architectural styles
- Society of Architectural Historians of Great Britain
