= Economy of the Federated States of Micronesia =

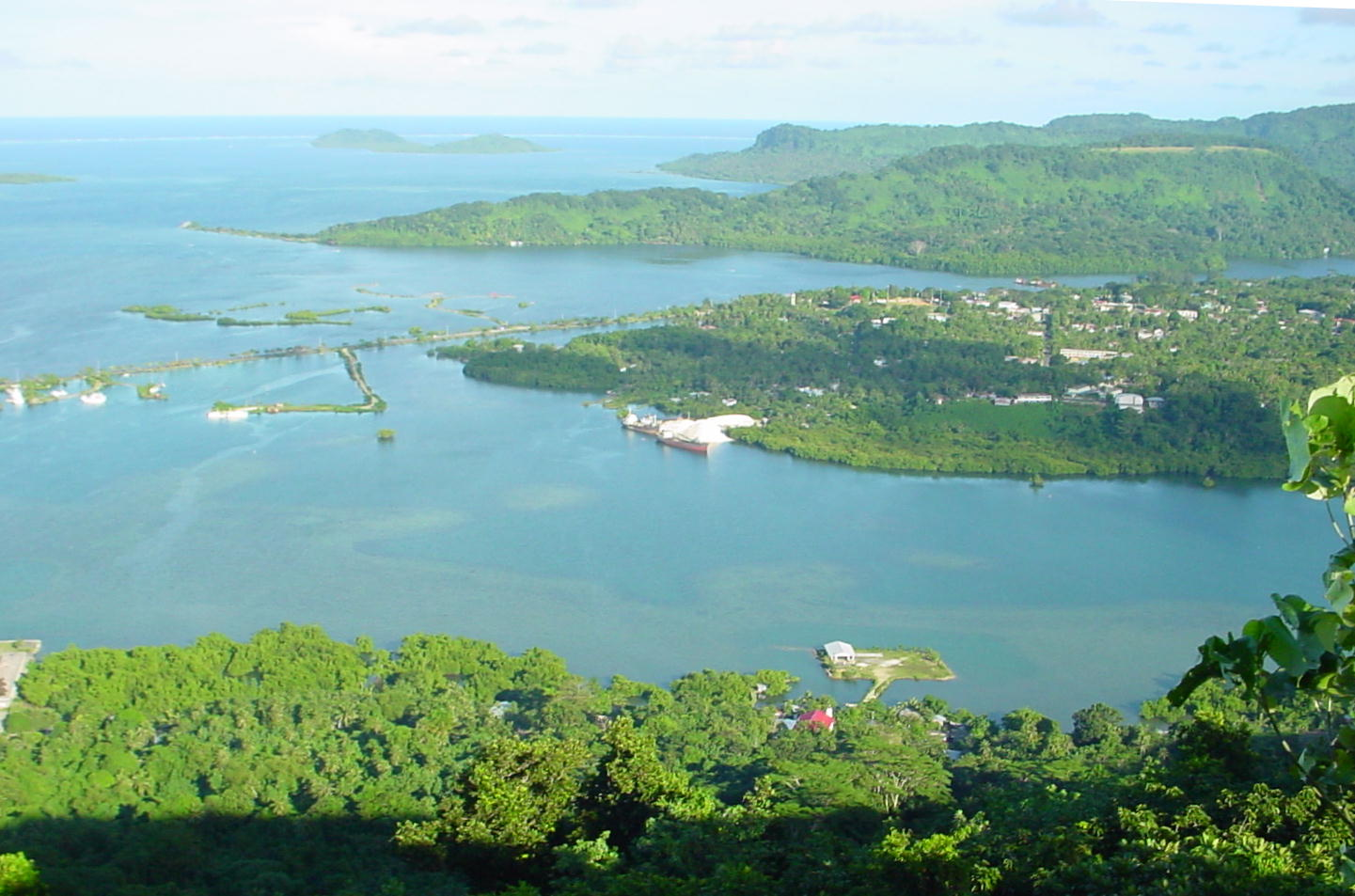
- Currency: United States dollar
- Fiscal year: 1 October- 30 September

Statistics
- GDP: ▲$0.372 billion (nominal, 2018); ▲$0.353 billion (PPP, 2018)
- GDP rank: 186th nominal (2013)
- GDP growth: 1.5% (2019 estimate)
- GDP per capita: ▲$3,634 (nominal, 2018); ▲$3,454 (PPP, 2018)
- GDP per capita growth: 0.6% (2025)
- GDP by sector: Agriculture: 26.3%; Industry: 18.9%; Services: 54.8% (2017 est.)
- Inflation (CPI): 1.5% (2018)
- Population below national poverty line: 26.7% (2000)
- Gini coefficient: 40.1 (2013)
- Labor force: 37,920 (2010)
- Labor force by occupation: Services: 93.9%; Agriculture: 5.2%; Industry: 0.9% (2013 est.)
- Unemployment: 16.2% (2010)

External
- Exports: $39.88 Million (2015 est.)
- Imports: $167.8 Million (2015 est.)
- FDI stock: $15.8 Million (2013 est.)

Public finance
- Government debt: 24.5% of GDP (2017 est.)
- Foreign reserves: $157 Million (2016)
- Revenue: $213.8 Million (2013 est.)
- Spending: $192.1 Million (2013 est.)
- All values, unless otherwise stated, are in US dollars.

The economic activity of the Federated States of Micronesia consists primarily of subsistence agriculture and fishing. The islands have few mineral deposits worth exploiting, except for high-grade phosphate. The potential for a tourist industry exists, but the remoteness of the location and a lack of adequate facilities hinder development. Financial assistance from the US is the primary source of revenue, with the US pledged to spend $1.3 billion in the islands in 1986–2001. Geographical isolation and a poorly developed infrastructure are major impediments to long-term growth.

Under the terms of the Compact of Free Association, the United States provided FSM with around $2 billion in grants and services from 1986 to 2001. The Compact's financial terms are being renegotiated for an extension period. In 2001 the U.S. provided more than $84 million in Compact grants—an amount equivalent to over one-third of FSM's GDP—plus more than $20 million through other federal programs. Total official development assistance from all sources was more than $100 million in 2001, with nearly 90% of that total coming from the U.S.

The FSM public sector plays a central role in the economy as the administrator of the Compact money. The national and state-level governments employ over one-half of the country's workers and provide services accounting for more than 40% of GDP. Faced with the potential decrease or cessation of some of the assistance programs upon the Compact's financial provisions' expiry in 2001, the Government of the FSM in 1996 began to implement a program of economic reforms designed to reduce the role of the public sector in the economy. In addition, the advent of music startups using .fm domain names has provided a new, albeit fairly small, stream of revenue to the government.

== Sectors ==
The fishing industry is highly important. Foreign commercial fishing fleets pay over $20 million annually for the right to operate in FSM territorial waters. These licensing fees account for nearly 30% of domestic budgetary revenue. Additionally, exports of marine products, mainly reexports of fish to Japan, account for nearly 85% of export revenue.

The tourist industry is present but has been hampered by a lack of infrastructure. Visitor attractions include scuba diving in each state, World War II battle sites, and the ancient ruined city of Nan Madol on Pohnpei. Some 15,000 tourists visit the islands each year. The Asian Development Bank has identified tourism as one of FSM's highest potential growth industries.

Farming is mainly subsistence, and its importance is declining. The principal crops are coconuts, bananas, betel nuts, cassava, and sweet potatoes. Less than 10% of the formal labor force and less than 7% of export revenue come from the agriculture sector. Manufacturing activity is modest, consisting mainly of the export of betel nut in Yap and production of buttons from trochus shells.

=== Transport ===
Railways: 0 km

Highways: total:

paved:

unpaved:

(1996 est.)

Ports and harbors: Colonia (Yap), Kolonia (Pohnpei), Lele, Moen

Merchant marine: total: three ships (1,000 GT or over) 3,560 GT/ by type: cargo one, passenger/cargo two (2007)

Airports: Six (2007)

Airports - with paved runways:
total: Six
1,524 to 2,437 m: Four (Chuuk International Airport, Kosrae International Airport, Pohnpei International Airport and Yap International Airport)
914 to 1,523 m: Two (2007)

=== Telecommunications ===
This article is about communications systems in the Federated States of Micronesia.

In 2010, Pohnpei State was connected to the Internet using the HANTRU-1 undersea communications cable to provide high-speed bandwidth. Kosrae State, Chuuk State, and Yap State, were planned to be connected in a second phase.

=== Education ===
Education in the Federated States of Micronesia is required for citizens aged 6 to 14 (or 1st to 8th grade), and is important to their economy. The literacy rate for citizens aged 15 to 24 is 98.8%.

The national education agency is the FSM Department of Education. Each state has its own education agency operating public schools.

- Chuuk State Department of Education
- Kosrae State Department of Education
- Pohnpei State Department of Education
- Yap State Department of Education

The College of Micronesia is the tertiary institution which serves the country.

=== Healthcare ===
Prevalence of obesity in the adult population, top countries (2016), Micronesia has the eighth highest rate in the world.

The Human Rights Measurement Initiative finds that the Federated States of Micronesia are fulfilling 94.9% of what it should be fulfilling for the right to health based on its level of income. When looking at the right to health with respect to children, the Federated States of Micronesia achieve 97.1% of what is expected based on their current income. In regards to the right to health amongst the adult population, the country achieves only 91.9% of what is expected based on the nation's level of income. The Federated States of Micronesia fall into the "good" category when evaluating the right to reproductive health because the nation is fulfilling only 95.8% of what the nation is expected to achieve based on the resources (income) it has available.

Life expectancy at birth in the Federated States of Micronesia was 66 for men and 69 for women in 2018.

Pingelap in Pohnpei State is notable for the prevalence of an extreme form of color blindness called achromatopsia, and known locally as maskun. Approximately 5% of the atoll's 3000 inhabitants are afflicted.

== Taxation and trade ==
Exports of Micronesia by product category (2019) Chemical products Transportation Machines Mineral products Plastics and rubbers Metals Foodstuffs Precious metals Textiles Instruments Animal products Vegetable products Paper goods Footwear and headwear Miscellaneous Stone and glass Wood products Animal and vegetable bi-products Animal hides Arts and antiques Weapons

The large inflow of official assistance to FSM allows it to run a substantial trade deficit and to have a much lighter tax burden than other states in the region (11% of GDP in FSM compared to 18–25% elsewhere). The government also borrowed against future Compact disbursements in the early 1990s, yielding an external debt of $111 million in 1997 (over 50% of GDP).

There are no patent laws in Micronesia.
