= List of Micronesian flags =

List of flags associated with the Federated States of Micronesia

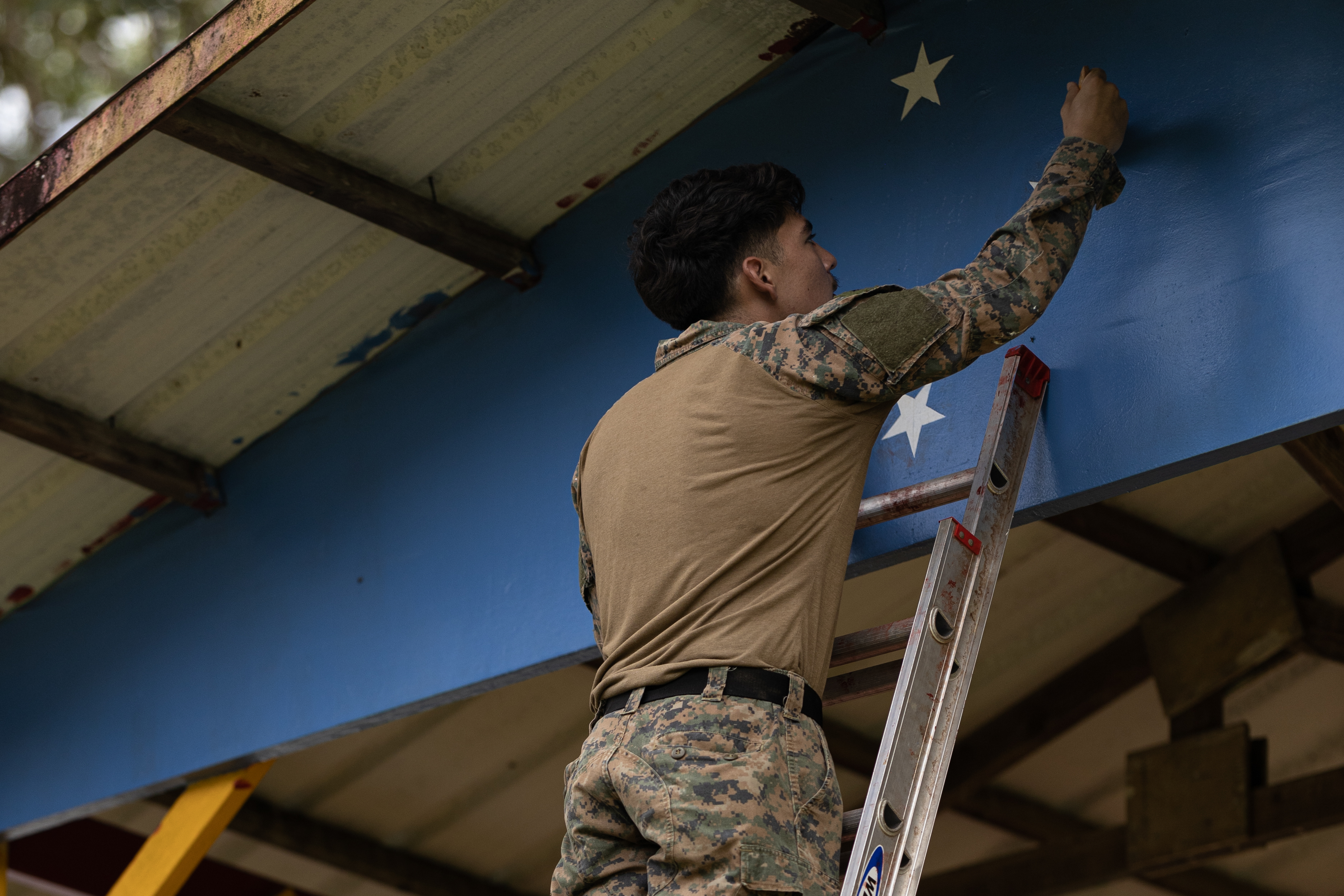
The Micronesian flag being painted

This is a list of flags associated with the Federated States of Micronesia.

== National flags ==
Flag	Duration	Use	Description
	1978–present	Flag of the Federated States of Micronesia	A flag with a ratio of 10:19 featuring four stars, arranged in a circle, on a blue field.
	1978–present	Variant	The national flag with a darker blue.

== Flags of the States of Micronesia ==
Flag	Duration	Use	Description
	1997–present	Flag of Chuuk State	
	1981–present	Flag of Kosrae	
	1992–present	Flag of Pohnpei State	A flag featuring a wreath of coconut leaves with eleven stars and a sakau cup in the middle, on a blue field.
	1980–present	Flag of Yap State	

== Flags of municipalities of Micronesia ==
=== Chuuk State ===
Flag	Duration	Use	Description
Link to file		Flag of Fefen	A blue field containing a mura bird flanked by a torch and wokupuun club, surrounded by a circle of 24 stars representing the island's villages.
Link to file		Flag of Fonoton	A white field with the municipal seal as the charge. The circular municipal seal displays an island, sunrise, three stars and palm leaves. Its inscriptions are the names of Fonoton and Chuuk State, the year 1992 commemorating its separation from the municipality of Weno, and a motto in the itang secret language reading Machewen Nechuunupuung, translatable as "Assembly of the Sovereign".
Link to file		Flag of Houk	A blue field with the municipal seal. Below it is the motto "Prosperity Through Unity" in green capital letters.
Link to file		Flag of Kuttu	A white flag with a seal as the charge.
Link to file	6 June 2011 – present	Flag of Moch	A light blue field with the municipal seal as the charge. A column of three white five-pointed stars representing Moch's villages are to the left, and a column of five representing its clans are to the right.
Link to file		Flag of Tonoas	A light blue vertical flag with a large, white five-pointed star. Above it is a green witiwit (Ptilinopus porphyraceus) carrying a streamer in its beak reading "e koi epwe saram epwe raan" ("calling for the light to shine on the land"), which is a phrase in the itang secret language. Below the star the year 2002 is inscribed.
Link to file	1993 – present	Flag of Tsis	A green field with an emblem in the charge.
Link to file		Flag of Udot	A blue bordered and horizontally striped white flag with a white hoist side bearing a fish above a first fruits bowl, surrounded by ten stars in a ring.
		Flag of Weno	A monochrome white circular emblem bearing fourteen stars and an illustration of Tonnachau Mountain upon a field described as both dark green and black.

=== Kosrae ===
Flag	Duration	Use	Description
		Flag of Tafunsak	A dark blue field with scene featuring a beach, aeroplane, traditional canoe and palm tree, overlayed with four dark blue stars to represent Tafunsak's hamlets, encompassed by an olive branch wreath.
Link to file		Flag of Utwe	A red-white-blue tricolor bearing a gray silhouette of a crab with an illustration of Mount Finkol and canoe racing within it, surrounded by three white stars, a black wreath and arched text reading "UTWE MUNICIPAL GOVERNMENT". The white stars and stripes represent Utwe's three groups: red for Gateway, white for N-One and blue for Centerpoint.

=== Pohnpei State ===
Flag	Duration	Use	Description
Link to file	2019 – present	Flag of Kapingamarangi	A blue and green vertical triband with an emblem in the charge consisting of a canoe, wreath and stars.
		Flag of Kitti	A white flag with three blue horizontal stripes, with a white canton bearing a red crescent surrounded by twelve red stars.
		Flag of Kolonia	A red-white-green triband with a blue canton containing seven white five-pointed stars.
		Flag of Madolenihmw	Six red horizontal stripes with thinner white stripes in between them, with a light blue canton bearing the municipal seal and bordered by white.
	2010 – present	Flag of Mwoakilloa	A horizontal triband, coloured orange, white and green from top to bottom, with a blue triangle representing the ocean bearing three white stars representing the Urak, Kahlap, and Manton islands on the hoist side.
		Flag of Nett	Nine stripes alternating between purple and white; in a light blue canton are nine white stars arranged in a circle.
		Flag of Nukuoro	A blue field with three white five-pointed stars arranged in a triangle.
	July 2003 – present	Flag of Pingelap	Four rows, yellow, blue, red, and white (from top to bottom), with an emblem in the canton. The four colours represent groups of Pingelapese people: yellow for Mweniap/Peisik, blue for Peraku/Namahl, red for Sakarkapw/Ihlong and white for Kakalia/Pelenkous.
		Flag of Sapwuahfik	A pentacolor striped flag with yellow, blue, white, red, and green from top to bottom. In a green canton, one large white five-pointed star and nine smaller ones arranged in an arc on its flyward side.
		Flag of Sokehs	A blue field with the municipal seal upon a yellow sun with five-pointed stars next to the tips of its rays.
		Flag of U	A wreath encompassing five white stars on a blue field.

== Flags of villages of Micronesia ==
=== Chuuk State ===
Flag	Duration	Use	Description
	By 1 October 2000 – present	Flag of Sapuk, Weno	A green field with an irregular circle of fourteen white irregular stars.

== Historical flags ==
Flag	Duration	Use	Description
	1885–1899	Flag of the Spanish East Indies	
	1899–1914	Flag of the German Empire	
	1914–1919	Flag of the Empire of Japan	
	1919–1944	Flag of the South Seas Mandate	
	1919–1944	Flag of the Governor of the South Seas Mandate	
	1944–1947	Flag of the United States	
	1947–1965	Flag of the Trust Territory of the Pacific Islands	
	1965–1980	Flag of the Trust Territory of the Pacific Islands	

=== Pohnpei State ===
Flag	Duration	Use	Description
	1977–1992	Flag of Pohnpei State	

== Shipping companies ==
Flag	Duration	Use	Description
		House flag of the FSM line, subsidiary of Kyowa Kisen	

== See also ==
- Flag of the Federated States of Micronesia
