= Nett =

Municipality in the Federated States of Micronesia

Coordinates: 6°56′19″N 158°13′07″E

- Municipality
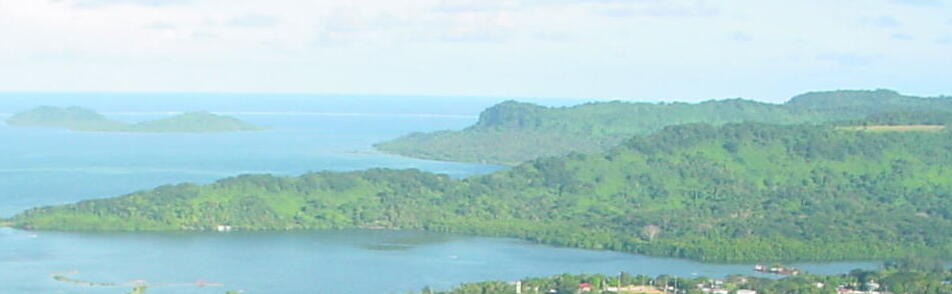
- Nett peninsula

- Flag Seal
- Interactive map of Nett
- Country: Federated States of Micronesia
- State: Pohnpei State

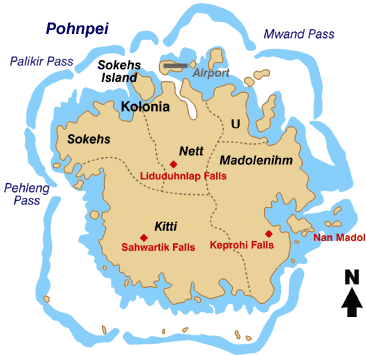
Map of Pohnpei Island showing the municipalities

Nett also written as Net, is one of the administrative divisions of Pohnpei State, Federated States of Micronesia.

== Description ==
Nett is one of the six municipalities located in the main island of Pohnpei. It corresponds to the north-central sector of the island.

The population was 6,639 as of 2010. Nett municipality formerly included Kolonia, now a separate administrative division.

Nett has been historically subdivided into 23 sections, districts, or villages (kousapw): Parempei, Lenger, Leprohi, Sekeren, Weipowe, Diadi, Tomwara, Dolokei, Lewetik, Takaieu, Paliais, Seinwar, Meitik, Paremkep, Nansokasok (Nan Sokasok), Eirike (Eirke), Nanipil, Kahmar, Doaroapop, Pohndien, Dolakapw, Mesenieng, and Lehdau. This includes Mesenieng, which is the traditional name of the now separate municipality Kolonia, which is still claimed by Nett municipality as one of its kousapw.

The kousapw are or were further subdivided into peliensapw (farmsteads).

== Education ==
Pohnpei State Department of Education operates public schools:

- Nett Elementary School
- Parem Elementary School

Bailey Olter High School (former Pohnpei Island Central School or PICS) in Kolonia serves students from Nett.

== See also ==
- Madolenihmw
- Kitti (municipality)
- U, Pohnpei
- Sokehs
- Kapingamarangi
- Pingelap
- Sapwuahfik
- Nukuoro
- Mokil
- Kolonia
- Oroluk
- Palikir
