= Madolenihmw =

Municipality of Pohnpei State, Federated States of Micronesia

Coordinates: 6°49′15″N 158°18′10″E

- Municipality
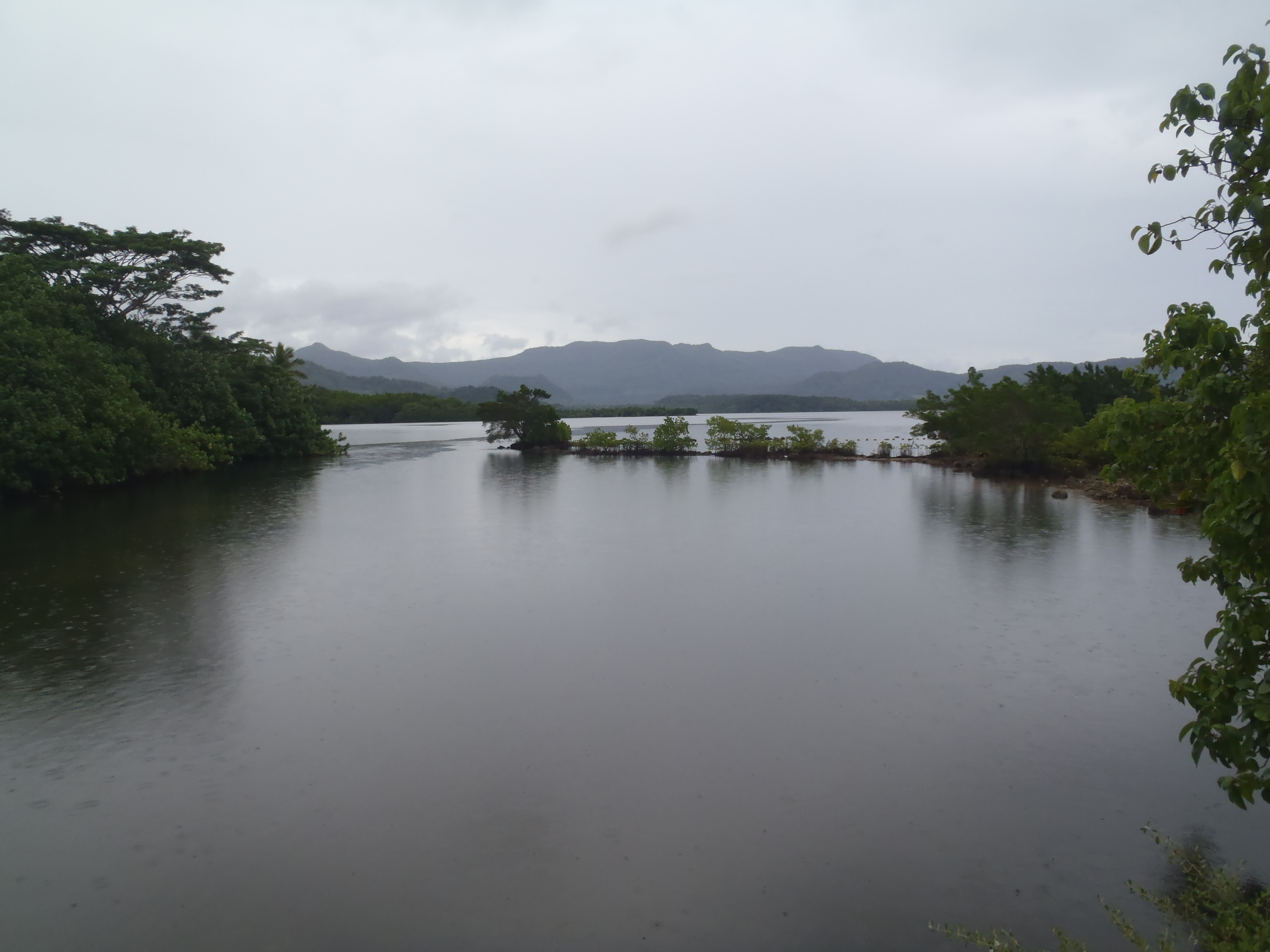
- Causeway to Temwen Island

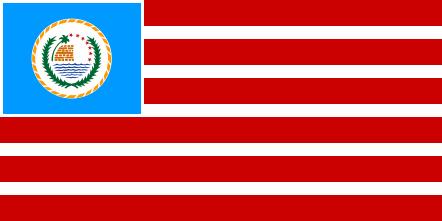
- Flag Seal
- Interactive map of Madolenihmw
- Country: Federated States of Micronesia
- State: Pohnpei State

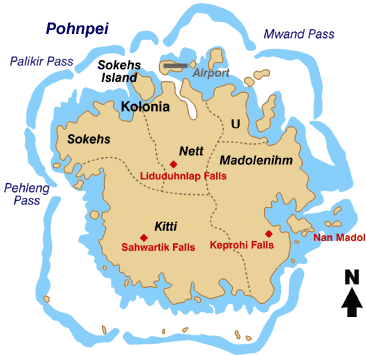
Map of Pohnpei Island showing the municipalities.

Madolenihmw is one of the administrative divisions of the Micronesian island of Pohnpei. It is located in the central east of the island, to the east of Mount Nahna Laud and south of Mount Kapwuriso. The coast of Madolenihmw includes a large bay which contains the island of Temwen, famous for its Nan Madol ruins.

== Climate ==
Metalanim, Pohnpei, Federated States of Micronesia (elevation 9.1 metres (30 ft)

Climate chart (precipitation, max. and min. temperature)
J	F	M	A	M	J	J	A	S	O	N	D
11 86 73	8.6 86 73	11 86 73	17 86 73	16 87 72	14 87 71	14 88 70	13 88 71	13 88 70	13 88 70	14 88 71	15 86 72
- █ Average max. and min. temperatures in °F
- █ Precipitation totals in inches
- Source: 1981-2010 provisional normals
Metric conversion
J	F	M	A	M	J	J	A	S	O	N	D
276 30 23	219 30 23	281 30 23	435 30 23	400 31 22	350 31 22	355 31 21	333 31 22	318 31 21	342 31 21	360 31 22	370 30 22
- █ Average max. and min. temperatures in °C
- █ Precipitation totals in mm

== Education ==
Pohnpei State Department of Education operates public schools:

- Madolenihmw High School
- ESDM Elementary School
- Lukop Elementary School
- Mand Elementary School
- Pohnlangas Elementary School
- Sapwalap Elementary School
- Temwen Elementary School
- Wapar Elementary School

Private school:

- Ohwa Christian High School

== See also ==
- Kitti (municipality)
- Sokehs
- U, Pohnpei
- Nett
- Kapingamarangi
- Pingelap
- Sapwuahfik
- Nukuoro
- Mokil
- Kolonia
- Oroluk
- Palikir
