= Pohnpei State Department of Education =

Education agency in Pohnpei State, Micronesia

Pohnpei State Department of Education (PDOE) is an agency of Pohnpei State, Federated States of Micronesia that operates public schools.

As of 2017 Churchill B. Edward is the department's director.

== Schools ==
As of 2007 it had 31 elementary schools with 556 preschool students and 8,112 elementary students, and three high schools with 2,713 students.

High schools:

- Bailey Olter High School (formerly Pohnpei Island Central School) - Kolonia
- Madolenihmw High School - Madolenihmw
- Nanpei Memorial High School - Kitti

Elementary schools:

- Awak Elementary School - U
- Enipein School - Kitti
- ESDM Elementary School - Madolenihmw
- Kapingamarangi Elementary School - Kapingamarangi
- Kolonia Elementary School - Kolonia
- Lewetik Elementary School - Sokehs
- Lukop Elementary School - Madolenihmw
- Mand Elementary School - Madolenihmw
- Mwoakilloa Elementary School - Mwoakilloa
- Nanpei Memorial Elementary School - Kitti
- Nett Elementary School - Nett
- Nukuoro Elementary School - Nukuoro
- Ohmine Elementary School - Kolonia
- Pakein Elementary School - Sokehs
- Palikir Elementary School - Sokehs
- Parem Elementary School - Nett
- Pehleng Elementary School - Kitti
- Pingelap Elementary School - Pingelap
- Pohnlangas Elementary School - Madolenihmw
- Rohi Elementary School - Kitti
- RSP Elementary School - Sokehs
- Saladak Elementary School - U
- Salapwuk Elementary School - Kitti
- Sapwalap Elementary School - Madolenihmw
- Sapwuafik Elementary School - Sapwuafik
- Seinwar Elementary School - Kitti
- Sekere Elementary School - Sokehs
- Sokehs Powe Elementary School - Sokehs
- Temwen Elementary School - Madolenihmw
- Wapar Elementary School - Madolenihmw
- Wone Elementary School - Kitti

== See also ==
- Education in the Federated States of Micronesia
