= Sokehs =

Municipality in Pohnpei, Federal States of Micronesia

Coordinates: 6.971°N 158.1872°E

- Municipality
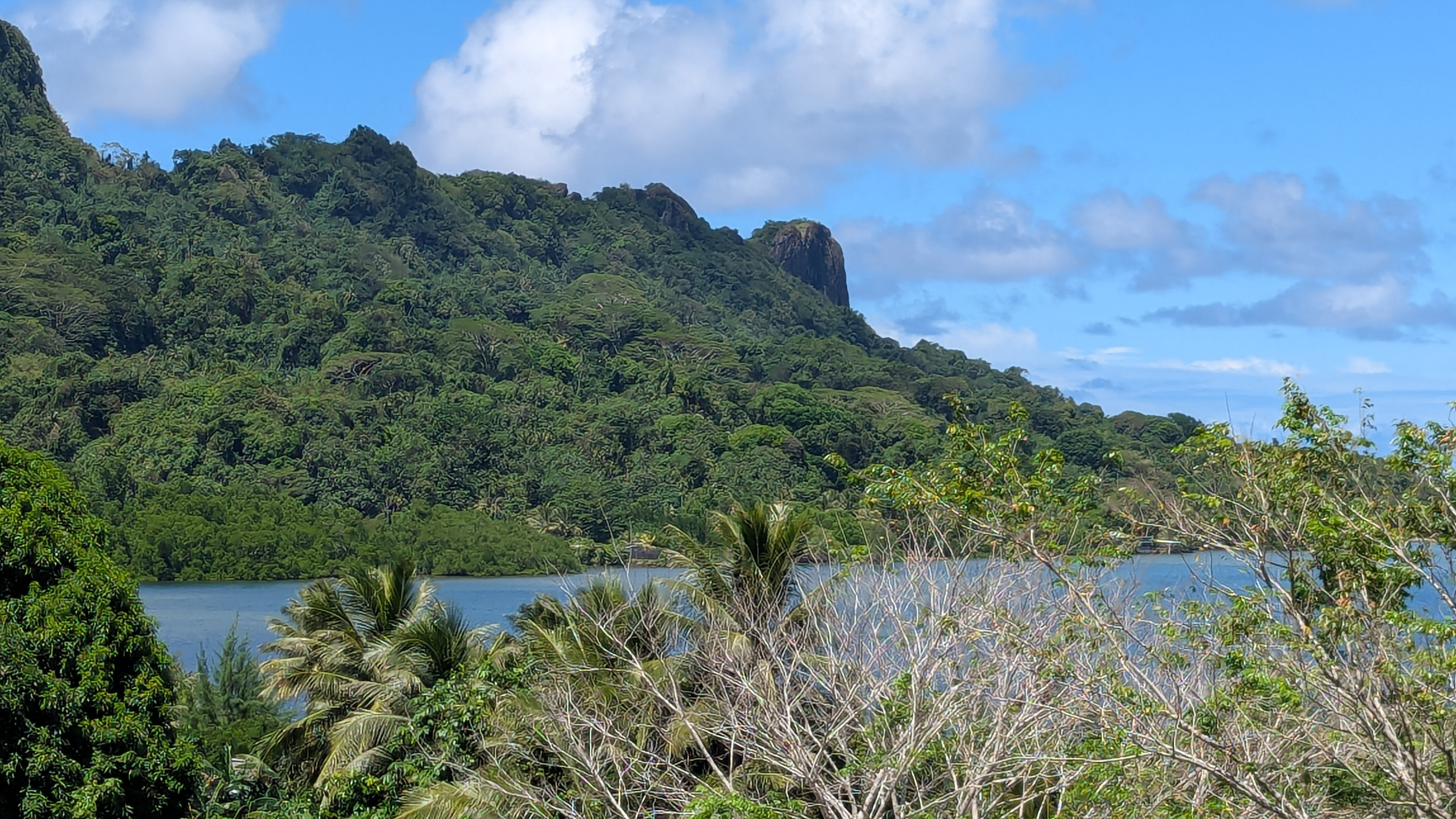
- Deke Sokehs

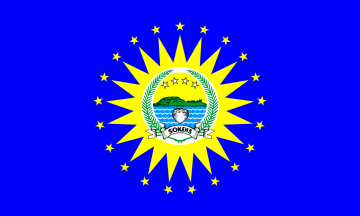
- Flag Seal
- Interactive map of Sokehs
- Country: Federated States of Micronesia
- State: Pohnpei State

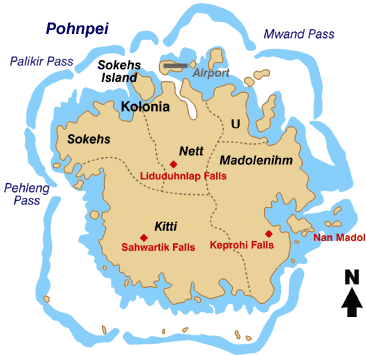
Map of Pohnpei Island showing the municipalities. Sokehs is on the upper left.

Sokehs is a municipality on the main island in the state of Pohnpei, Federated States of Micronesia. It consists of 21 villages. One of them is Palikir, the federal capital. Another is Pakin Atoll, an atoll some 30 km northwest of the main island of Pohnpei. Since 1985, the former, depopulated Oroluk Atoll and close by Minto Reef became part of Sokehs municipality.

The namesake Sokehs Peninsula is located north of the main island.

== Education ==
Pohnpei State Department of Education operates public schools:

- Lewetik Elementary School
- Pakein Elementary School
- Palikir Elementary School
- RSP Elementary School
- Sekere Elementary School
- Sokehs Powe Elementary School

Bailey Olter High School (former Pohnpei Island Central School or PICS) in Kolonia serves students from Sokehs.

== See also ==
- Madolenihmw
- Kitti (municipality)
- U, Pohnpei
- Nett
- Kapingamarangi
- Pingelap
- Sapwuahfik
- Nukuoro
- Mokil
- Kolonia
- Oroluk
- Palikir
