= Kapingamarangi =

Atoll of the Federated States of Micronesia

- Municipality
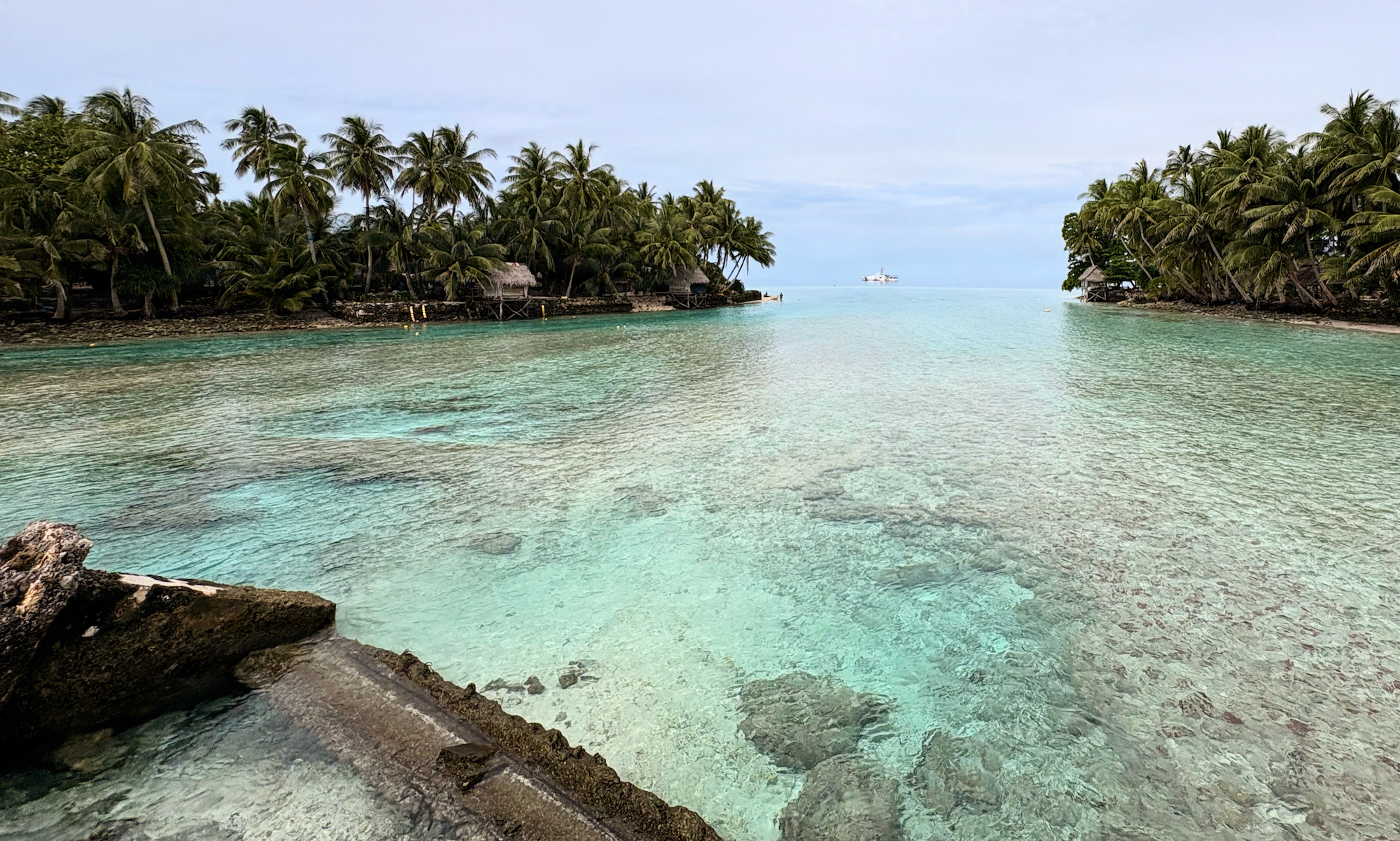
- Kapingamarangi

- Flag
- Interactive map of Kapingamarangi
- Country: Federated States of Micronesia
- State: Pohnpei State

Location of Kapingamarangi in the Pacific Ocean

Kapingamarangi is an atoll and a municipality in the state of Pohnpei of the Federated States of Micronesia. It is by far the most southerly atoll or island of the country and the Caroline Islands, 300 km (190 mi) south of the next southerly atoll, Nukuoro, and 740 km (460 mi) southwest of the main island of Pohnpei state; it forms a Polynesian outlier.

The total area of the atoll, including the lagoon, is 74 km^{2} (29 sq mi). Out of this, 1.1 km^{2} (0.4 sq mi) is land area, spread over 33 wooded islets on the eastern side of the atoll, three of which host a population of about 500 people. The western reef rim of the atoll is almost submerged in high water.

Kapingamarangi is the southernmost point of Micronesia.

== Population ==
Kapingamarangi has a population of about 500 (as of 2007). Several hundred Kapingamarangi people also live in Porakied village in Kolonia, Pohnpei. Their language is Polynesian. The main industry is fishing.

Touhou Island, which reaches a height of 35 in (890 mm) and is connected to Welua Island (Ueru Island) in the north by a causeway, is the capital of the municipality, the center of population and the home of a native chief. Most of the population resides on these two islets, plus the remnant on Taringa (south of Touhou), although many of the remaining islets are used for growing fruit and vegetables.

== History ==
The first recorded sighting by Europeans was by the Spanish expedition of Hernando de Grijalva in 1537, who charted it as Los Pescadores (Island of the Fishermen in Spanish, not to be confused with Pescadores Islands). This discovery was referred by a contemporary, the Portuguese António Galvão, governor of Ternate, in his book Tratado dos Descobrimentos of 1563.

In the 19th century it was charted as Greenwich and Pikaram by the English, and Constantine by the French. The first European ship entered the lagoon and established direct contact with the islanders in 1877. When the Empire of Japan assumed control of Micronesia from the German empire in 1914, shipping, trade, and travel became more common to the islanders.

The island was attacked by U.S. Navy long-range bombers during World War II. Two Japanese ships are listed on a wreck diving website.

== Climate ==
Kapingamarangi has a tropical rainforest climate (Af) with heavy rainfall year-round.

Climate data for Kapingamarangi
Month	Jan	Feb	Mar	Apr	May	Jun	Jul	Aug	Sep	Oct	Nov	Dec	Year
Mean daily maximum °C (°F)	30.8 (87.5)	31.2 (88.2)	31.0 (87.8)	30.8 (87.5)	31.3 (88.4)	31.3 (88.4)	31.2 (88.2)	31.3 (88.4)	31.6 (88.9)	31.8 (89.2)	31.2 (88.1)	31.2 (88.1)	31.2 (88.2)
Daily mean °C (°F)	27.5 (81.5)	27.7 (81.9)	27.5 (81.5)	27.4 (81.3)	27.6 (81.7)	27.9 (82.3)	27.6 (81.7)	27.8 (82.1)	27.9 (82.3)	28.1 (82.5)	27.8 (82.0)	27.8 (82.0)	27.7 (81.9)
Mean daily minimum °C (°F)	24.2 (75.5)	24.2 (75.6)	24.1 (75.3)	23.9 (75.1)	23.9 (75.0)	24.6 (76.2)	24.1 (75.3)	24.3 (75.8)	24.3 (75.7)	24.4 (75.9)	24.4 (75.9)	24.4 (75.9)	24.2 (75.6)
Average rainfall mm (inches)	255.8 (10.070)	270.5 (10.650)	285.8 (11.250)	312.2 (12.290)	310.6 (12.230)	315.2 (12.410)	336.5 (13.250)	268.0 (10.550)	224.3 (8.830)	218.7 (8.610)	233.9 (9.210)	232.9 (9.170)	3,264.4 (128.52)

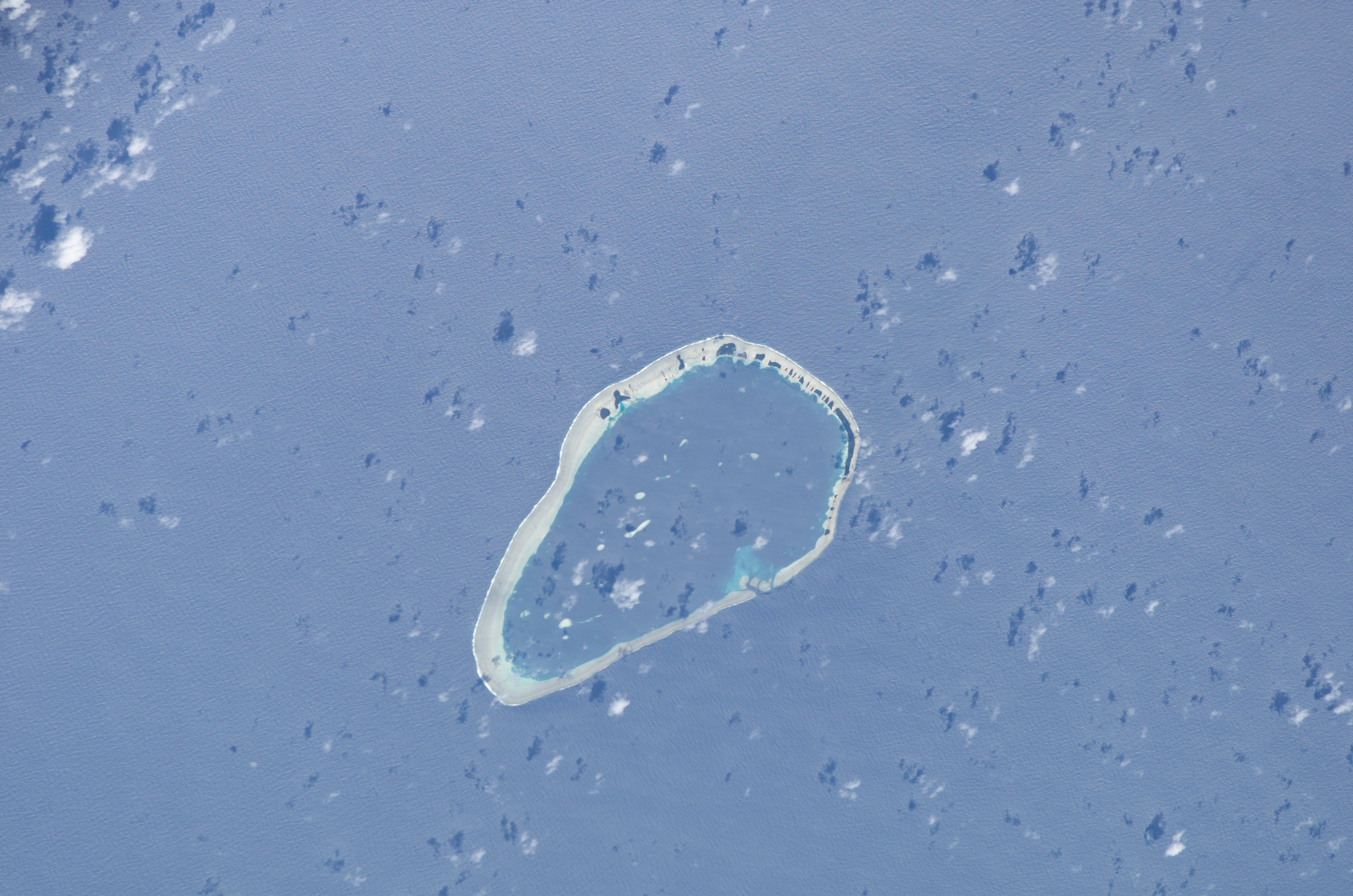
ISS Image of Kapingamarangi

== Spanish claims ==
During the dispute for the Carolines between Germany and Spain in 1885, arbitrated by Pope Leo XIII, the sovereignty of Spain over the Caroline and Palau islands as part of the Spanish East Indies was analyzed by a commission of cardinals and confirmed by an agreement signed on 17 December. Its Article 2 specifies the limits of Spanish sovereignty in South Micronesia, being formed by the Equator and 11°N Latitude and by 133° and 164° Longitude. In 1899, Spain sold the Marianas, Carolinas and Palaus to Germany after its defeat in 1898 in the Spanish–American War. However Emilio Pastor Santos, a researcher of the Spanish National Research Council, claimed in 1948 that there was historical basis, supported by the charts and maps of the time, to argue that Kapingamarangi and some other islands had never been considered part of the Carolines. Thus Kapingamarangi was not included in the description of the territory transferred to Germany, and therefore was not affected on the part of Spain to any cessation of transfer and theoretically Spain should have the only jurisdiction and right to this island.

Pastor Santos presented his thesis to the Spanish government in 1948. In the Council of Ministers of Spain on 12 January 1949, the Minister of Foreign Affairs declared on this proposal that it had passed to the first stage of public attention. The Cabinet of Diplomatic Information of the Ministry of Foreign Affairs circulated the following note:

The Minister of Foreign Affairs informed the Council of Ministers of the situation in which we find ourselves in view of information and public commentary in the press and because of the requests made of the Spanish administration. The Ministry recognizes that it is a certain fact and historic truth due to Article 3 of the Treaty of July 1, 1899, that Spain reserved a series of rights in Micronesia and for another thing, the specifications of the territories which Spain ceded in 1899 leaves apart certain groups of islands in the same zone.

However, no Spanish government has made any attempt in this respect, and this case remains as a historical curiosity related to Kapingamarangi.

== Help missions ==
Kapingamarangi has received some help missions from the European Union. The most important one was in 2019, when the European Union Cooperation Delegation in the Pacific, invested 14 months installing big water tanks in some parts of the atoll.

Some years ago Readiness for El Niño (RENI) project promoted by the European Union, offered 4.5 million euros, together with the Pacific Community, which implemented it with the governments of the Federated States of Micronesia developed this project focused on securing the food and water resources of the atoll. Also, but not as important as the previous ones, there are some organizations that have collaborated by helping the atoll, such as the University of Oregon Micronesia and South Pacific Program, PTT Found and the Project Management Unit that is part of The Adaptation Fund.

== See also ==
- Kapingamarangi language
- Christmas Drop
- Polynesian outliers
- Madolenihmw
- Kitti (municipality)
- U, Pohnpei
- Nett
- Sokehs
- Pingelap
- Sapwuahfik
- Nukuoro
- Mokil
- Kolonia
- Oroluk
- Palikir
