= Nukuoro =

Island in Pohnpei State, Federal States of Micronesia

Coordinates: 3°50′54″N 154°56′27″E

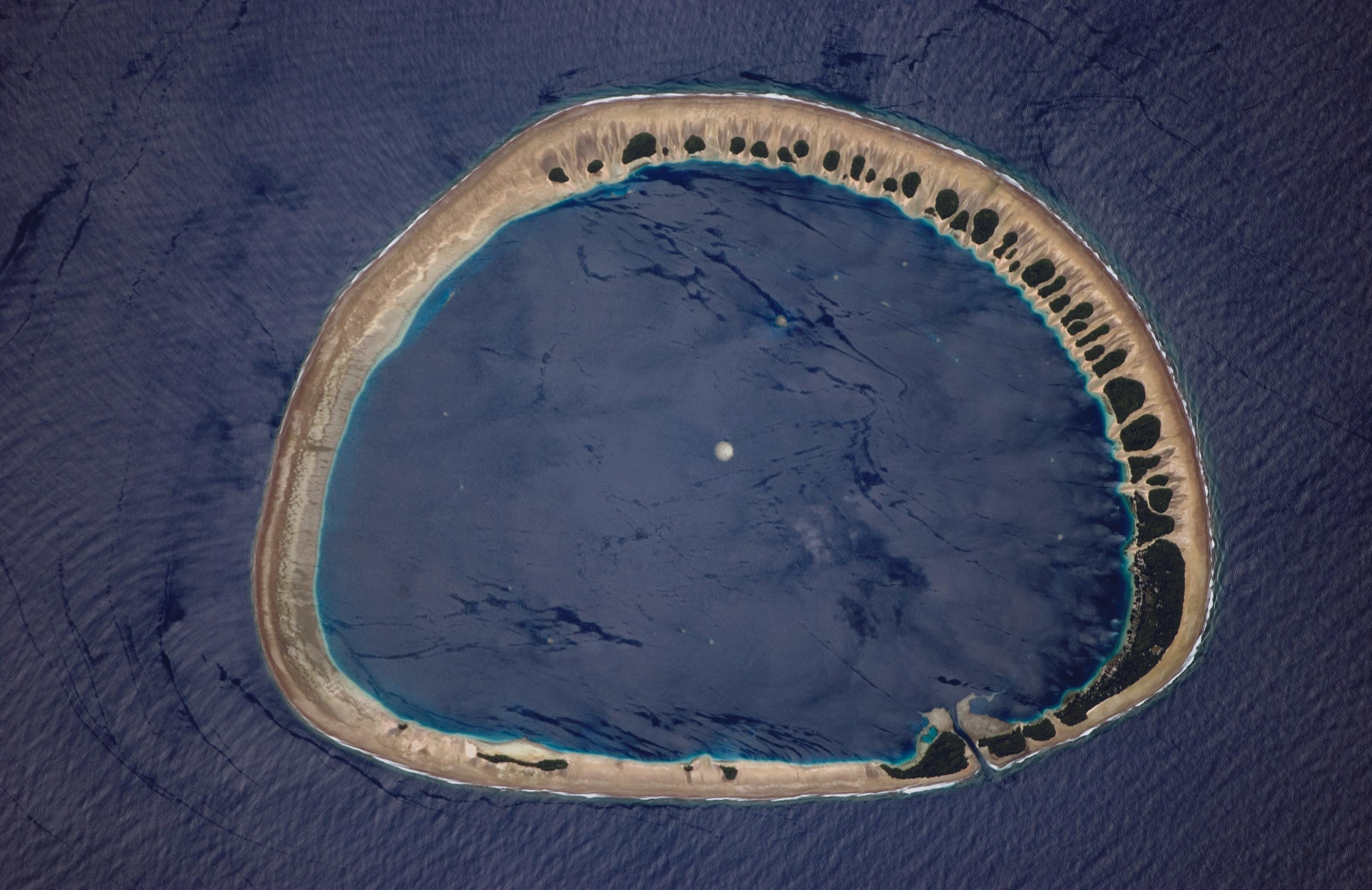
- Nukuoro from space. Courtesy NASA

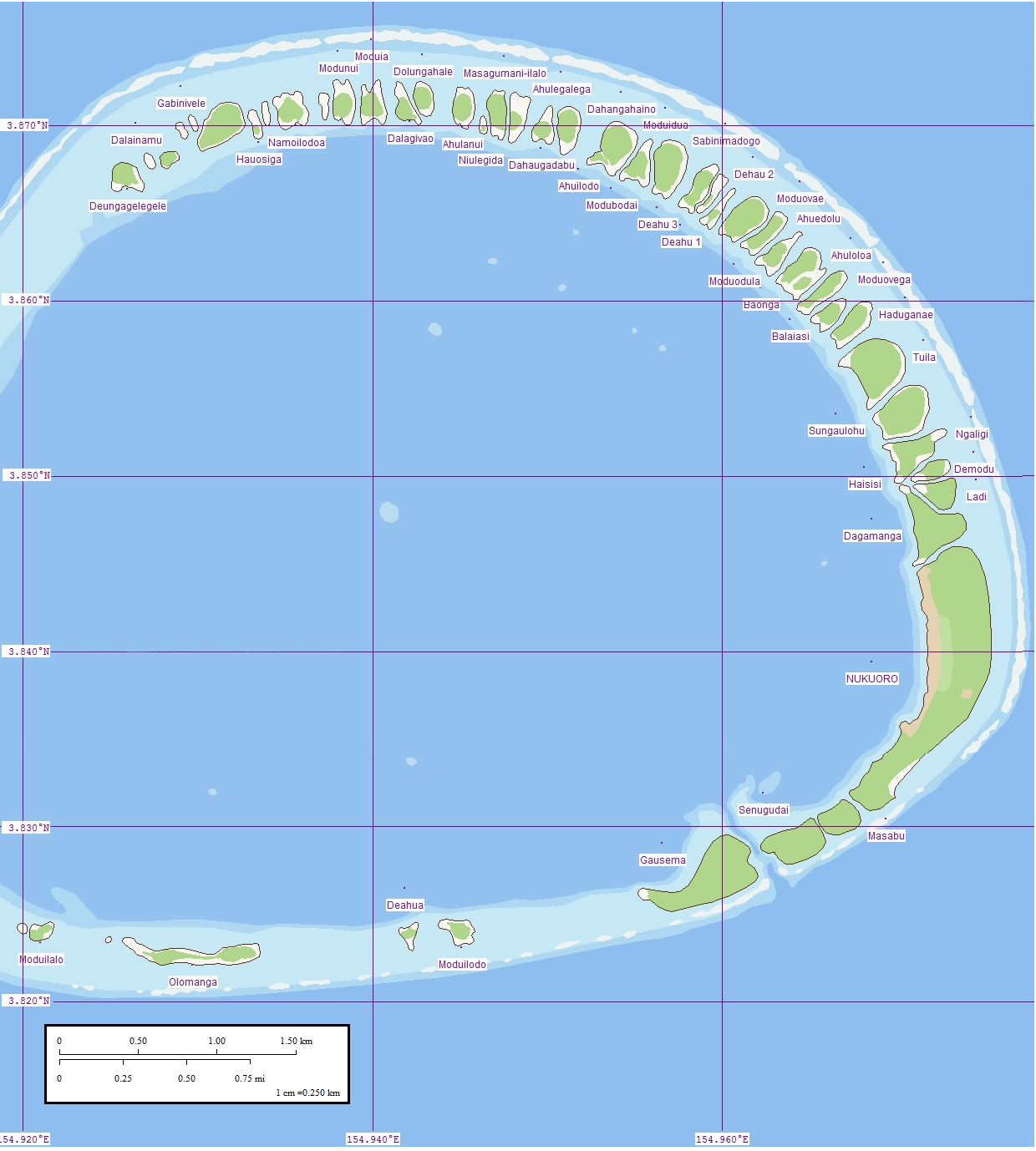
- Map of Nukuoro (without western rim)

Geography
- Total islands: 40
- Area: 40 km^{2} (15 sq mi)
- Length: 6 km (3.7 mi)

Administration
- Federated States of Micronesia
- State: Pohnpei

Demographics
- Population: 372 (2007)
- Languages: Nukuoro

Location of Nukuoro Atoll in the Pacific Ocean

The flag of Nukuoro

Nukuoro is an atoll in the Federated States of Micronesia. It is a municipality of the state of Pohnpei, Federated States of Micronesia. It is the second southernmost atoll of the country, after Kapingamarangi. They both are Polynesian outliers. As of 2007, Nukuoro had a population of 372, though several hundred Nukuorans live on Pohnpei. Fishing, animal husbandry, and agriculture (taro and copra) are the main occupations. A recent project to farm black pearl oysters has been successful at generating additional income for the island's people.

Nukuoro is remote. It has no airstrip, and a passenger boat calls irregularly only once every few months. The island has no tourism except for the occasional visit by passing sailing yachts. There is a 4-room schoolhouse but children over the age of 14 must travel to Pohnpei to attend high school.

== Geography ==
The total area, including the lagoon, is 40 km^{2} (15 sq mi), with a land area of 1.7 km^{2} (0.66 sq mi), which is divided among more than 40 islets that lie on the northern, eastern, and southern sides of the lagoon. By far the largest islet is Nukuoro Islet, which is the center of population and the capital of the municipality. The lagoon is 6 km (3.7 mi) in diameter.

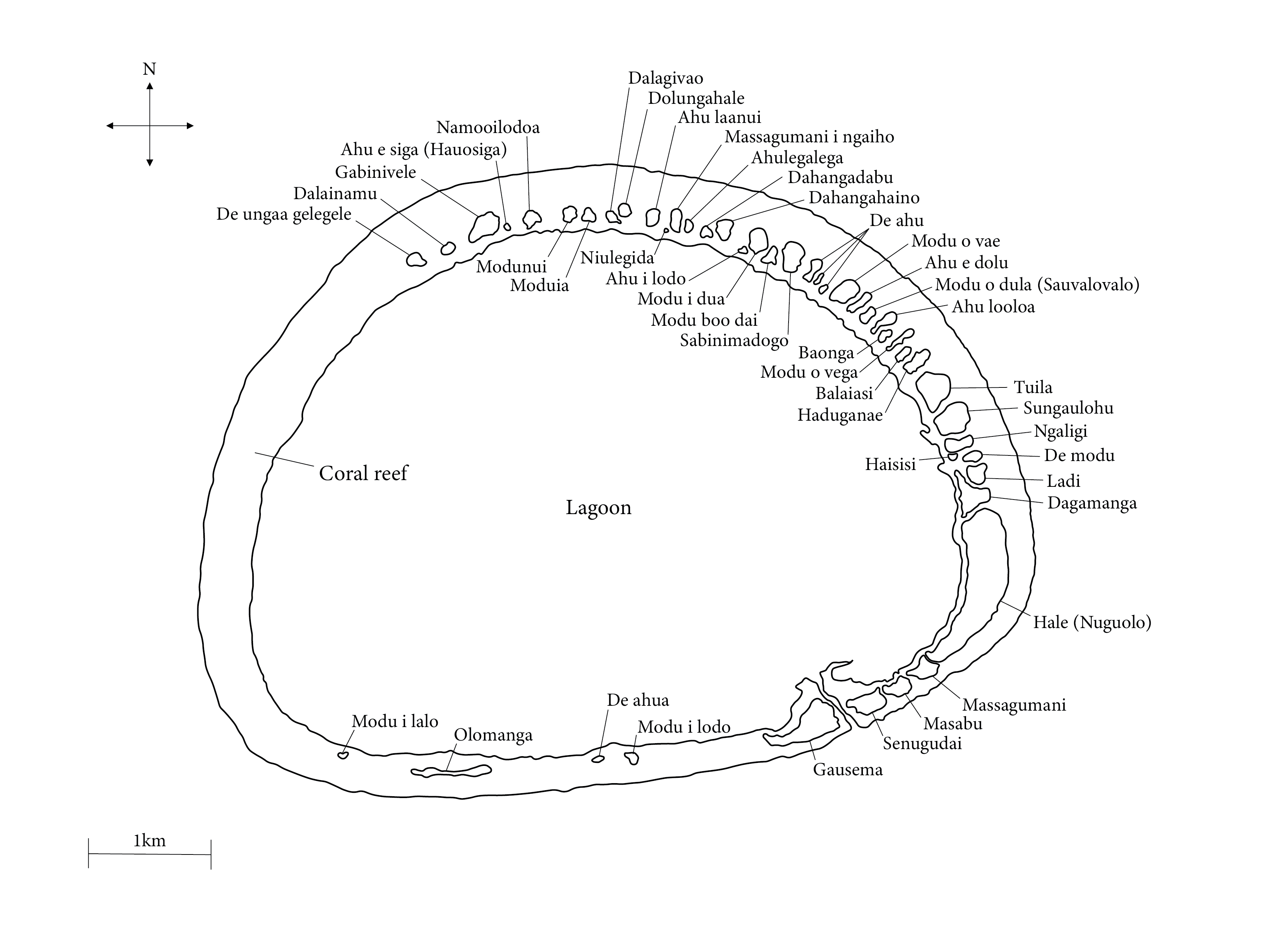

Traversable by foot during low tide, the islets of Nukuoro (called modu) are separated by narrow waterways during high tide. These modu form a chain that is perceived by residents as starting from the southwestern terminus (ngage "the front") to the northwestern terminus (ngaiho "the back"), in a counterclockwise direction. Direction when traveling along the atoll is relative and is determined by the terminus one is moving towards (i.e., one is 'going ngage' when moving away from ngaiho, and vice versa). This is true no matter which side of the atoll one is proceeding on. The largest islet, Nukuoro, which gives its name to the atoll, also affects direction on the atoll: when traveling towards Nukuoro, one is said to be 'going hale' ("home"), rather than 'going ngage/ngaiho.'

The lagoon itself also serves as a reference point to determine relative direction. Movement towards the lagoon, the center of the atoll, is called i dai ("on the water"), while movement outwards in the direction of the open ocean is called i dua ("on the back").

== Population ==
The inhabitants speak Nukuoro, which is a Polynesian language related to Kapingamarangi, Rennellese and Pileni languages. Nukuoro and Kapingamarangi constitute parts of the "Polynesian outlier" cultures, lying well outside the Polynesian Triangle.

A sizable proportion of the Nukuoro population have relocated from the atoll in recent years, with diaspora communities throughout Micronesia, the United States, and elsewhere in the world, but especially on the island of Pohnpei, to which there is continuous migration today. While about half of residents on the Nukuoro atoll are monolingual in Nukuoro, members of the speech community residing on Pohnpei are more commonly multilingual, with most speaking Pohnpeian, English, or both, in addition to Nukuoro.

According to oral tradition, the atoll was first settled by migrants originating from Samoa, led by a man named Vave, who remains an important figure in Nukuoro culture.

== History ==
In general, Polynesian Outlier communities are thought to have been established after the settlement of Polynesia proper, as a result of backwash migrations and drift voyages. Linguistic and folkloric evidence is consistent with this view: the Nukuoro language is closely related to Samoan, and the oral tradition describes the settlement of Nukuoro Atoll by a group of Samoans led by Vave, the son of a king from the Manu'a islands in Samoa. However, archaeological evidence suggests that Nukuoro Atoll has been continuously occupied since at least the ninth century A.D., with no clear evidence of cultural replacement and no unambiguously Polynesian artifacts.

What is known of the history of Nukuoro Atoll prior to European contact comes from the oral tradition, and narratives have occasionally been recorded and published by Western visitors. After the initial Samoan settlement of the island, the history of the atoll is punctuated by visitors from other Micronesian islands, including Yap, Chuuk, the Mortlock Islands, the Marshall Islands, the Gilbert Islands, Fiji, and Palau.

The first sighting recorded by Europeans was by Spanish naval officer Juan Bautista Monteverde on 18 February 1806 commanding the frigate San Rafael of the Royal Company of the Philippines. They have therefore appeared in the maps as the Monteverde Islands for a long time.

== Tino aitu sculptures ==
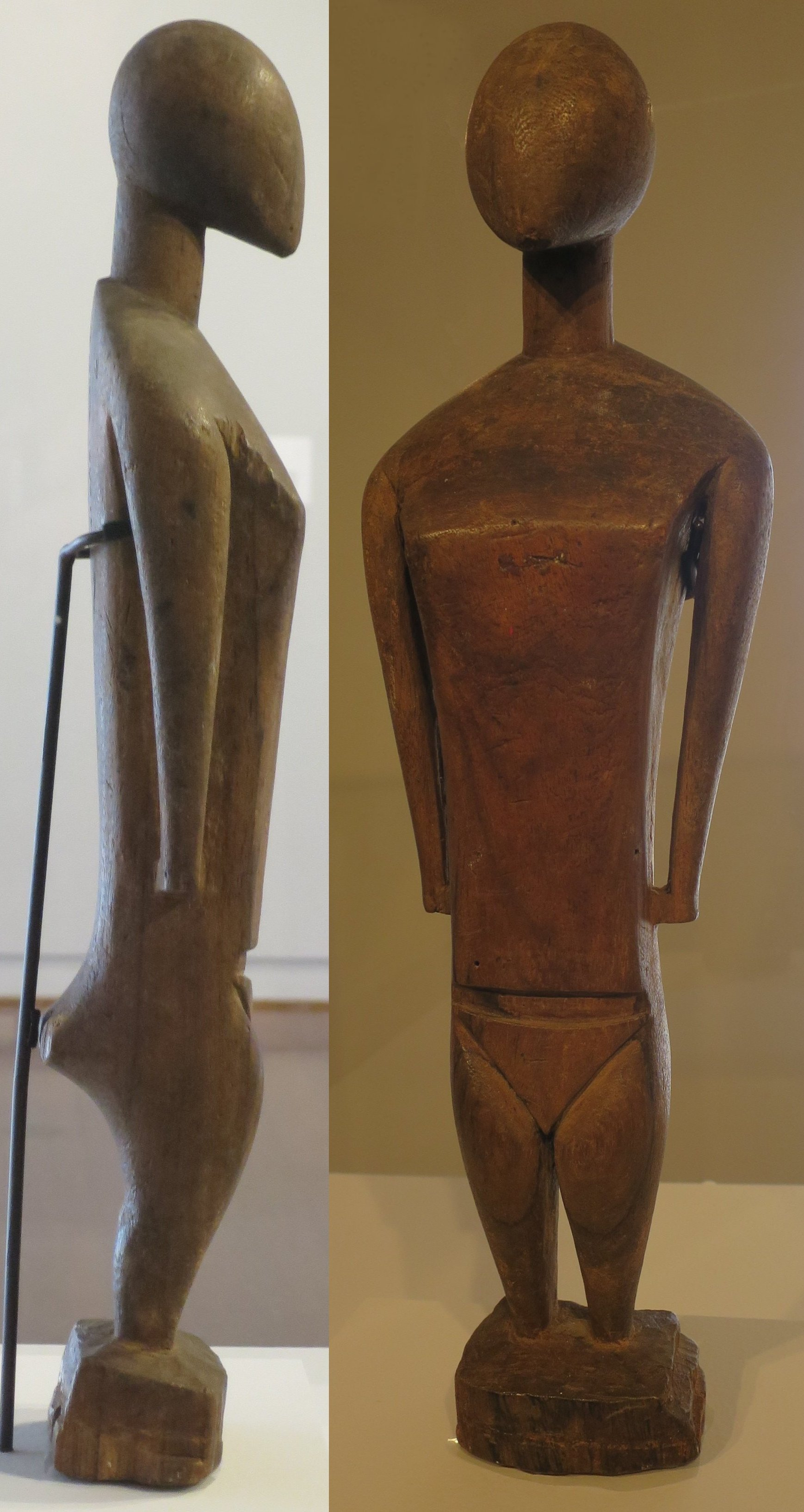
Tino aitu figure, housed at the Honolulu Museum of Art

Nukuoro is famous for its carved deity sculptures, which are known as tino aitu sculptures. The statues represent gods and deified ancestors who are associated with the five Nukuoro family groups: sekave, seala, sehege, sehena, and seolo. Traditionally, the figurines were placed in the malae (temple), as well as in the home, to protect their inhabitants from bad fortune and ill-wishing spirits. They were often given food as sacrificial offerings on major festive occasions, and were ritually clothed or adorned with flowers.

The sculptures, which range in size from 30 to 215 cm, are carved from breadfruit wood using local adzes equipped with either Tridacna shell blades or western metal blades. The surfaces were smoothed with pumice. They are known for their ovoid heads, faint or blank facial features, sloping shoulders, and geometric chests, buttocks, and legs. The chests of the figurines are typically indicated with a simple line, though some female figurines have rudimentary breasts. Some figurines are carved with tattoos.

Today, 37 Nukuoro sculptures are housed in museums and private collections around the globe, with many of the statues located in German and Hawai'ian museums. At least nine of these sculptures were collected by Johann Stanislaus Kubary, a Polish naturalist and ethnographer who visited the atoll in 1873 and 1877 as a collector for the Museum Godeffroy in Hamburg. An additional three sculptures were collected by Carl Jeschke, a German ship captain who visited first in 1904 and then more regularly between 1910 and 1913.

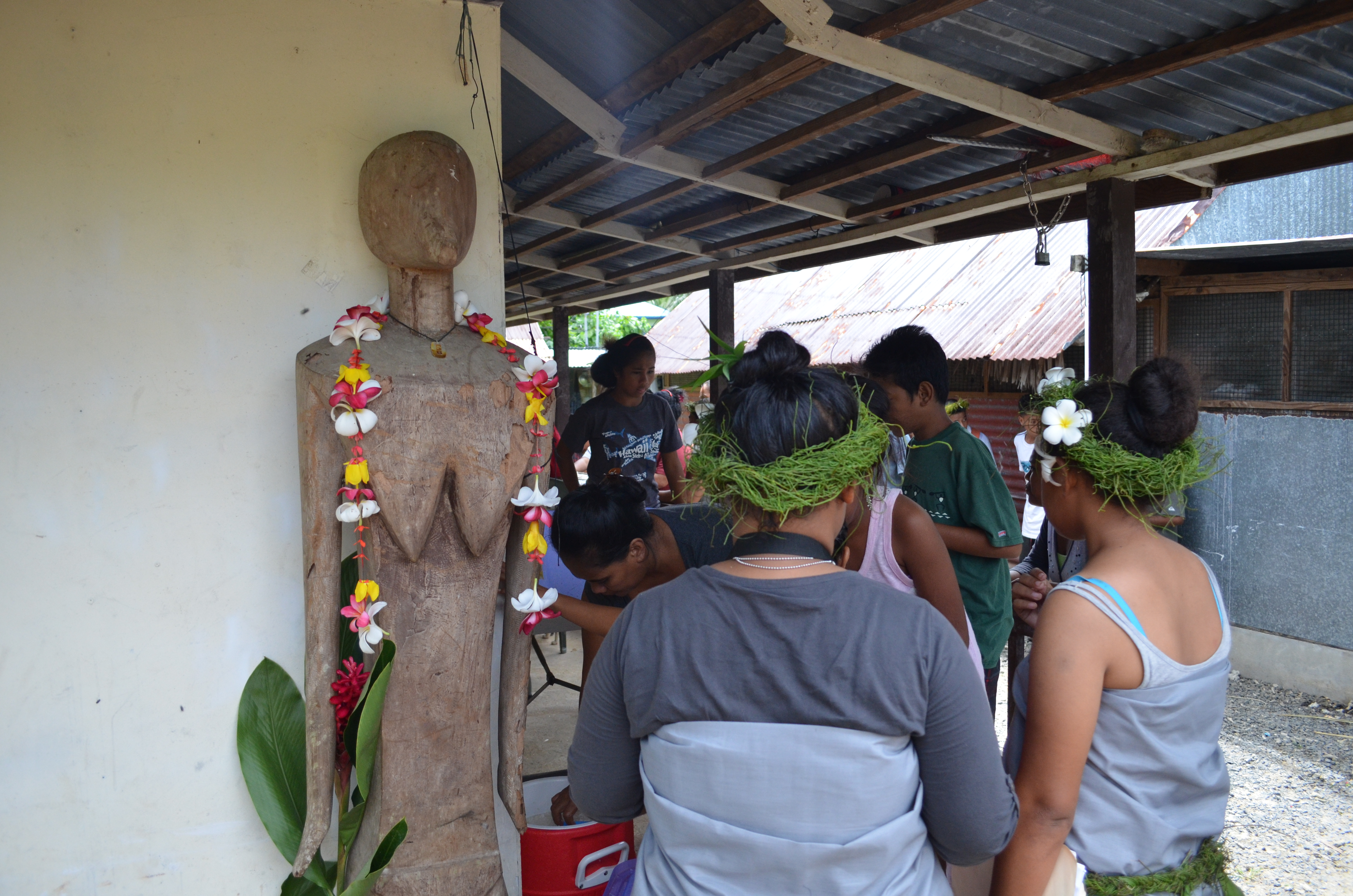
A life-sized female figure adorned with flowers at the Nukuoro community nahs in Kolonia, Pohnpei.

== See also ==
- Madolenihmw
- Kitti (municipality)
- U, Pohnpei
- Nett
- Kapingamarangi
- Pingelap
- Sapwuahfik
- Sokehs
- Mokil
- Kolonia
- Oroluk
- Palikir
