= College of Micronesia-FSM =

Public community college in Micronesia

Coordinates: 6.9086°N 158.1598°E

- Type: public
- Established: 1978
- Accreditation: ACCJC
- Endowment: unknown
- Budget: ~32 M$, 2021
- President: Theresa Koroivulaono
- Undergraduates: unknown
- Postgraduates: none
- Location: Palikir, Pohnpei, Federated States of Micronesia (main campus)
- Language: English
- Website: www.comfsm.fm

The College of Micronesia-FSM (COM-FSM) is a public community college in the Federated States of Micronesia. It began operation in 1963 as the Micronesian Teacher Education Center.

The college has a state campus in each of the states (Chuuk Campus, Kosrae Campus, Yap Campus) with its national campus in the capital of Palikir, Pohnpei. Pohnpei Campus located in Kolonia later became the CTEC Campus. The COM-FSM system also includes the Fisheries and Maritime Institute (FMI) on the Yap islands.

== History ==
Thomas R. Murray explains the Community College of Micronesia originated from a teaching training center on the grounds of the Pacific Islands Central School, later known as Pohnpei Island Central School (PICS) and now Bailey Olter High School, established in 1962. The official school history alternatively says it originated in 1963 when the Trust Territory of the Pacific Islands (TTPI) contracted the University of Hawaii to administer the Micronesian Teacher Education Center, an in-service training facility for selected TTPI teachers.

According to Thomas R. Murray, Community College of Micronesia began operations in 1969 as a way of enhancing the training of area teachers, and it initially issued elementary education associate degrees. Teachers of elementary school students who desired more advanced degrees formed the bulk of the student bodies of the College of Micronesia-FSM extension centers. However, the school's official history, that it was in 1970 the TTPI High Commissioner signed Administrative Directive No. 70-2 changing the name of the center to Community College of Micronesia (CCM), after which the college began offering a college curriculum in its own name. Beginning in 1971, the TTPI Department of Education began assuming more responsibility for the college; the university involvement was phased out in 1973. CCM remained essentially a teacher college until 1974 when the first non-education-related associate degree program was added to the curriculum.

According to Thomas R. Murray, the school as it is known today was formed by the 1976 merger of the Community College of Micronesia in Kolonia, Pohnpei; and the Micronesian Occupational College, which was built in Koror, Palau between the late 1960s and the middle of the 1970s. However, the school's official history says the change occurred in 1978 when an act of the Seventh Congress of Micronesia joined CCM with the then Micronesian Occupational Center in Palau and the College’s nursing school in Saipan to form the College of Micronesia (COM) as a public corporation governed by a Board of Regents.

In 1987, the newly independent nations of the Federated States of Micronesia, the Republic of Palau, and the Republic of the Marshall Islands signed a treaty affirming a desire to continue supporting COM. However, in 1991, the three nations signed an agreement to restructure COM to allow more local autonomy. As a result, in 1992, the Seventh Congress of the Federated States of Micronesia passed Public Law No. 7-79 establishing the College of Micronesia-FSM as a public corporation under its own Board of Regents. Thus, on April 1, 1993, the College of Micronesia-FSM became the national college of the federation. In 1999, through a memorandum of understanding with the national government, COM-FSM accepted management of the Fisheries & Maritime Academy (FMA) in Yap, renamed the FSM Fisheries & Maritime Institute.

== Academics ==
Pohnpei students from the COM-FSM National Campus came out in their traditional colors at the Spanish Wall Field in Kolonia Town to celebrate the College’s Founding Day.

The college awards associate degrees and certificates as well as two bachelor's degrees. It also has articulation agreements with several online and conventional institutions.

The College of Micronesia is accredited by the Accrediting Commission for Community and Junior Colleges. In 2004, the college was placed on "warning" status by its accreditor; that status was removed the following year.

== Notable faculty ==
- Dirk Ballendorf, historian of Micronesia, President of the College of Micronesia from 1977 to 1979.
- Iris Falcam, former First Lady and librarian for the Pacific collection from 1979 to 2010.
- Adelyn Noda, Kosrae's youngest ordained deaconess.

== See also ==
- Education in the Federated States of Micronesia
