= U, Federated States of Micronesia =

Municipality of Pohnpei State, Federated States of Micronesia

Coordinates: 6°58′13″N 158°15′27″E

- Administrative division
- Flag Seal
- Interactive map of U, Federated States of Micronesia
- Country: Federated States of Micronesia
- State: Pohnpei State

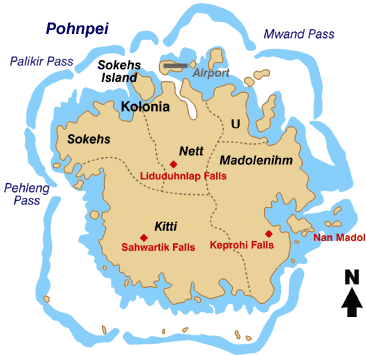
Map of Pohnpei Island showing the municipalities, U is on the upper right.

U, also written Uh, is one of the administrative divisions of Pohnpei State, Federated States of Micronesia. U bears the shortest place name in the Federated States of Micronesia, and one of the shortest in the world.

== Description ==
U is one of the six municipalities located in the main island of Pohnpei. It corresponds to the northeastern sector of the island. U had 2,289 inhabitants according to the 2008 census.

Alohkapw is the main town. A channel known as Kepidewen Alohkapw marks the boundary between U and Madolenihmw municipalities.

== Education ==
Pohnpei State Department of Education operates public schools:

- Awak Elementary School
- Saladak Elementary School

Bailey Olter High School (former Pohnpei Island Central School or PICS) in Kolonia serves students from U.

== See also ==
- Madolenihmw
- Kitti (municipality)
- Sokehs
- Nett
- Kapingamarangi
- Pingelap
- Sapwuahfik
- Nukuoro
- Mokil
- Kolonia
- Oroluk
- Palikir
