= Nanpei Memorial High School =

Location
- Kitti, Pohnpei Island, Pohnpei State; Micronesia
- Coordinates: 6.822226199999998°N 158.18678290000003°E

Information
- Type: High school
- School district: Pohnpei State Department of Education

Nanpei Memorial High School, also known as Kitti High School, is a senior high school in Kitti, Pohnpei Island, Pohnpei State, Federated States of Micronesia. As of 2018, the school, operated by the Pohnpei State Department of Education, has about 600 students.

== See also ==
- Education in the Federated States of Micronesia
