= Madolenihmw High School =

School in the Federated States of Micronesia

Location
- Madolenihmw, Pohnpei Island, Pohnpei State; Federated States of Micronesia; 6.8376809°N 158.29834340000002°E

Information
- Type: High school
- School district: Pohnpei State Department of Education

Madolenihmw High School is a senior high school in Pohnlangas, Madolenihmw, Pohnpei Island, Pohnpei State, Federated States of Micronesia. As of 2018 the school, operated by the Pohnpei State Department of Education, has about 400 students.

== See also ==
- Education in the Federated States of Micronesia
