= UH =

Uh or UH may refer to:

== Education ==
=== United States ===
- University of Hartford, Connecticut
- University of Hawaiʻi system
  - University of Hawaiʻi at Mānoa
- University of Houston, Texas

=== United Kingdom ===
- United Hospitals, collective name for the medical schools of London
- University of Hertfordshire
- University of Huddersfield
- University of Hull

=== Other countries ===
- University of Hasselt, Belgium
- University of Havana, Cuba
- University of Heidelberg, Germany
- University of Helsinki, Finland
- University of Hyogo, Japan

== Places ==
- Uh, Federated States of Micronesia
- Uherské Hradiště, Czech Republic
- Upper Hutt, New Zealand
- Uzh, a European river (Slovak: Uh)

== Other uses ==
- "Uh", a speech disfluency in English
- University hospital
  - List of university hospitals
- Ukrainian hryvnia, a currency
- Ulster Hospital, Dundonald, Northern Ireland
- Unang Hirit, a Philippine morning TV show
- Utility helicopter, an aircraft type
- Derrick Uh (died 2022), a Belizean crime victim
