= Fono, Federated States of Micronesia =

Island in the Federated States of Micronesia

Fono Azayt
- Flag

- Location in Federated States of Micronesia
- Coordinates: 7°29′5″N 151°52′52″E
- Country: Federated States of Micronesia
- State: Chuuk State
- Time zone: UTC+11 (Time zone)

Fono is an island in the Federated States of Micronesia. The island has one church, St. Ignatius Loyola Church and approximately 400 residents.
