= Bailey Olter High School =

Location
- Kolonia, Pohnpei Island, Pohnpei State; Micronesia
- Coordinates: 6.949722199999999°N 158.20333329999994°E

Information
- Type: High school
- School district: Pohnpei State Department of Education

Bailey Olter High School, formerly Pohnpei Island Central School (PICS), and Pacific Islands Central School, is a senior high school in Kolonia, Pohnpei Island, Pohnpei State, Federated States of Micronesia. As of 2018 the school, operated by the Pohnpei State Department of Education, has about 1,500 students, making it the state's largest high school. Its service area includes Kolonia, Nett, Sokehs (including the FSM capital Palikir), and U.

PICS was the first senior high school on the island of Pohnpei; it was originally the sole senior high school in the Trust Territory of the Pacific Islands, and for a period then only secondary school in the Micronesia region.

== History ==
In 1947 the Mariana Islands' Teacher Training School (MITTS) opened in Guam. MITTS was a normal school serving all areas of the Trust Territory. It moved to Chuuk (Truk) in 1948, to be more central in the Trust Territory, and was renamed Pacific Islands' Teacher Training School (PITTS). The school's function was to develop local Micronesian teaching staff for the Trust Territory.

It transitioned from being a normal school to a comprehensive secondary school, so it was renamed the Pacific Islands Central School. The school moved to Pohnpei in 1959. At the time it was a three-year institution housing students who graduated from intermediate schools.

Additions were built between the late 1960s to the middle of the 1970s, a period when several other public high schools were built in the Trust Territory of the Pacific Islands.

== See also ==
- Education in the Federated States of Micronesia
