= Pohnpei State =

Pohnpei Wein Pohnpei, Weipokon en Pohnpei
- State
- Flag Seal
- Anthem: I Sohte Kak Moanokehla Pohnpei (Pohnpeian)
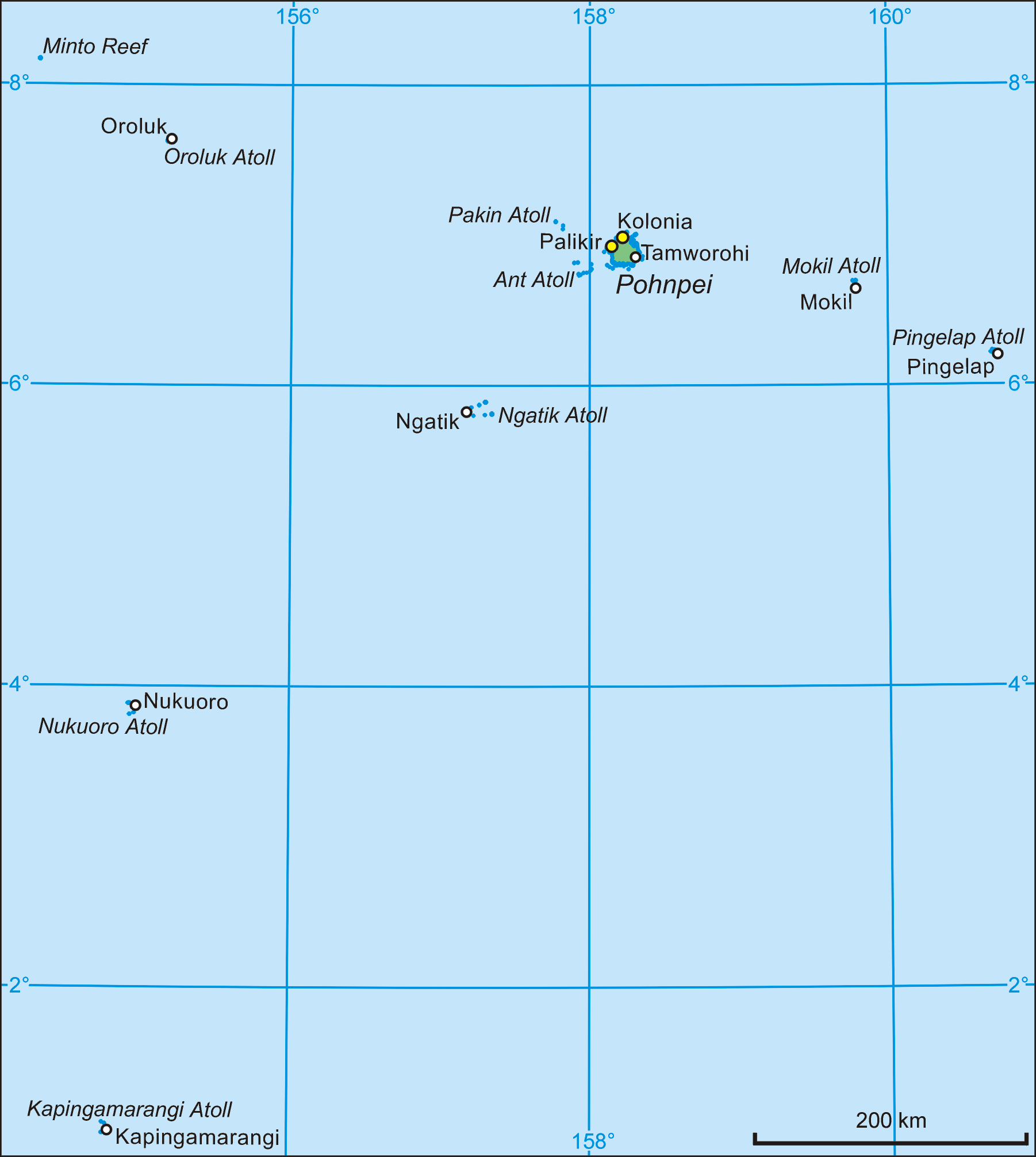
- Map of Pohnpei State

- Pohnpei in Micronesia
- Coordinates: 6°51′N 158°13′E
- Country: Federated States of Micronesia
- Capital: Kolonia

Government
  - Governor: Stevenson Joseph (since 2024)

Area
  - Total: 371.6 km^{2} (143.5 sq mi)

Population (2023)
  - Total: 26,102
  - Density: 70.24/km^{2} (181.9/sq mi)
- Time zone: UTC+11
- ISO 3166 code: FM-PNI

Pohnpei State (/ˈpɔːnpeɪ/), officially simply Pohnpei, is one of the four states of the Federated States of Micronesia (FSM). Its capital is Kolonia. With a land area of 346 km^{2} (134 sq mi), it is the largest state.

== History ==
The pre-colonial history of Pohnpei is divided into three stages: Mwehin Kawa or Mwehin Aramas (c. 1100); Mwehin Sau Deleur (from c. 1100 to c. 1628); and Mwehin Nahnmwarki (from c. 1628 to c. 1885).

In Pohnpei there are historic ruins of a Micronesian civilization, especially the ruins of Nan Madol.

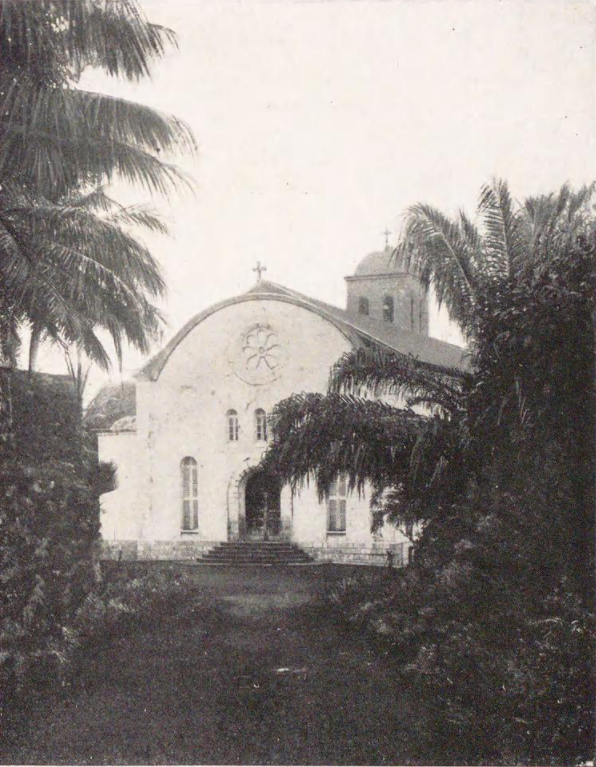
Old Catholic Church in Pohnpei (1932)

=== Spanish colonization ===
The Caroline Islands, within which the island of Pohnpei is currently included, were visited on 22 August 1526 by the Spanish explorer Toribio Alonso de Salazar. On 1 January 1528, the explorer Alonso de Saavedra took possession of the islands of Uluti in the name of the King of Spain. The archipelago was visited in 1542, by the Matelotes Islands in 1543 and 1545, and by Legazpi in 1565.

The first European visitor to Ponapé was Pedro Fernández de Quirós, commanding the Spanish ship San Gerónimo. He sighted the island on 23 December 1595; his description of it is brief and he never landed there. The second known European visit did not occur until much later, by the Australian John Henry Rowe, his ship John Bull arrived on the island on September 10, 1825, being attacked by the natives. Pohnpei, together with the Senyavin Islands, was included in the European navigation charts after being sighted by the Russian navigator Fyodor Litke in 1828, more than two centuries after the rest of the Caroline Islands. The main seat of government of the Carolinas was found on this island. The Spaniards called the island Ponapé and established the city of Santiago de la Ascensión, which became their first capital. As it was the seat of the Spanish colony (composed of officials, military, missionaries and Filipino workers) it became known simply as Colonia or Kolonia, adjacent to the current capital, Palikir.

In 1885, at the behest of the Spanish government, a new expedition was organized in the Philippines, then a colony of Spain, to proceed with the definitive occupation of the archipelago of the Carolinas, under Spanish sovereignty. The island of Ponapé, in the eastern part of the archipelago, extended over 2,000,000 square kilometers of ocean, was chosen as the seat of the government by means of the triple support of Manila-Guaján-Ponapé, which also made it possible to effectively patrol that vast expanse of jurisdictional waters.

Commander Posadillo was appointed head of the expedition and arrived on the island at the end of 1885. The scarce garrison and administrative equipment was installed on the island. The company was not economically profitable due to "the small variety of export products, the distance from the markets, the fact that it could only occupy a small number of square kilometers and the cost of maintaining a growing number of detachments"; it was rather due to prestige requirements. For this reason, when in 1887 there was an uprising by the indigenous people, who murdered the entire Spanish colony, a new expedition was immediately ordered to leave.

The troops that composed the next Spanish expedition were commanded by Commander Diaz Varela. Another naval officer, Capitán de fragata (Frigate Captain) Luis Cadarso y Rey de Andrade, joined the expedition as governor of the archipelago; as commanding officer of unprotected cruiser Reina Cristina, he would die eleven years later in the Battle of Manila Bay in combat with the American protected cruiser USS Olympia, the flagship of the United States Navy's Asiatic Squadron, during the Spanish-American War. Ponapé was reached after twelve days of painful journey and what the natives had destroyed was rebuilt, locking it in a fort. When they saw an important military presence on the island, they accepted the Spanish authority, advised by a European named Deoane, who lived among them, and who may have been the instigator of the previous rebellion.

While the Spanish domination lasted on the island, peaceful periods and skirmishes took place over that territory with a complicated morphology that made operations difficult. The rebellions were often joined by indigenous people from the adjacent islands over which no effective control could be exercised. Throughout those years, Spanish casualties as a result of these confrontations were proportionally numerous: in one of them, for example, there were thirty dead and fifty wounded. It was often necessary to apply authority with absolute force. The remains of Fort Alfonso XIII, known as "Spanish Wall", date from the colonial period.

=== German and Japanese control ===
After the Spanish–American War of 1898, Germany bought the island from Spain; under German sovereignty, the colony was officially named Kolonia. Ponapé was occupied by Japan during World War I, after which the League of Nations declared that the Carolinas Islands should pass to the Japanese administration, as a war debt for the German defeat, together with the Marshall Islands and the Mariana Islands (except Guam, US territory). Japanese sovereignty lasted from 1914 to 1945.

During World War II, the American amphibious campaigns of the Pacific War between 1943 and 1945 bypassed the islands. U.S. forces attacked Japanese military installations on the islands on several occasions, including bombardments by the battleships USS Massachusetts (BB-59) and USS Iowa (BB-61) and an airstrike by the light aircraft carrier USS Cowpens (CVL-25).

=== United States administration ===
Former flag used from 1977 to 1992

At the end of World War II, the Caroline Islands became part of the Trust Territory of the Pacific Islands under the administration of the United States. Pohnpei, when it was a district of the territory, initially contained the island of Kosrae, which was a municipality of the Pohnpei district. In 1977, Kosrae became a separate district.

=== Federated States of Micronesia ===
The Federated States of Micronesia gained full independence in 1985. Since then, Pohnpei has been a sheltered tropical port under indirect U.S. control.

== Geography ==
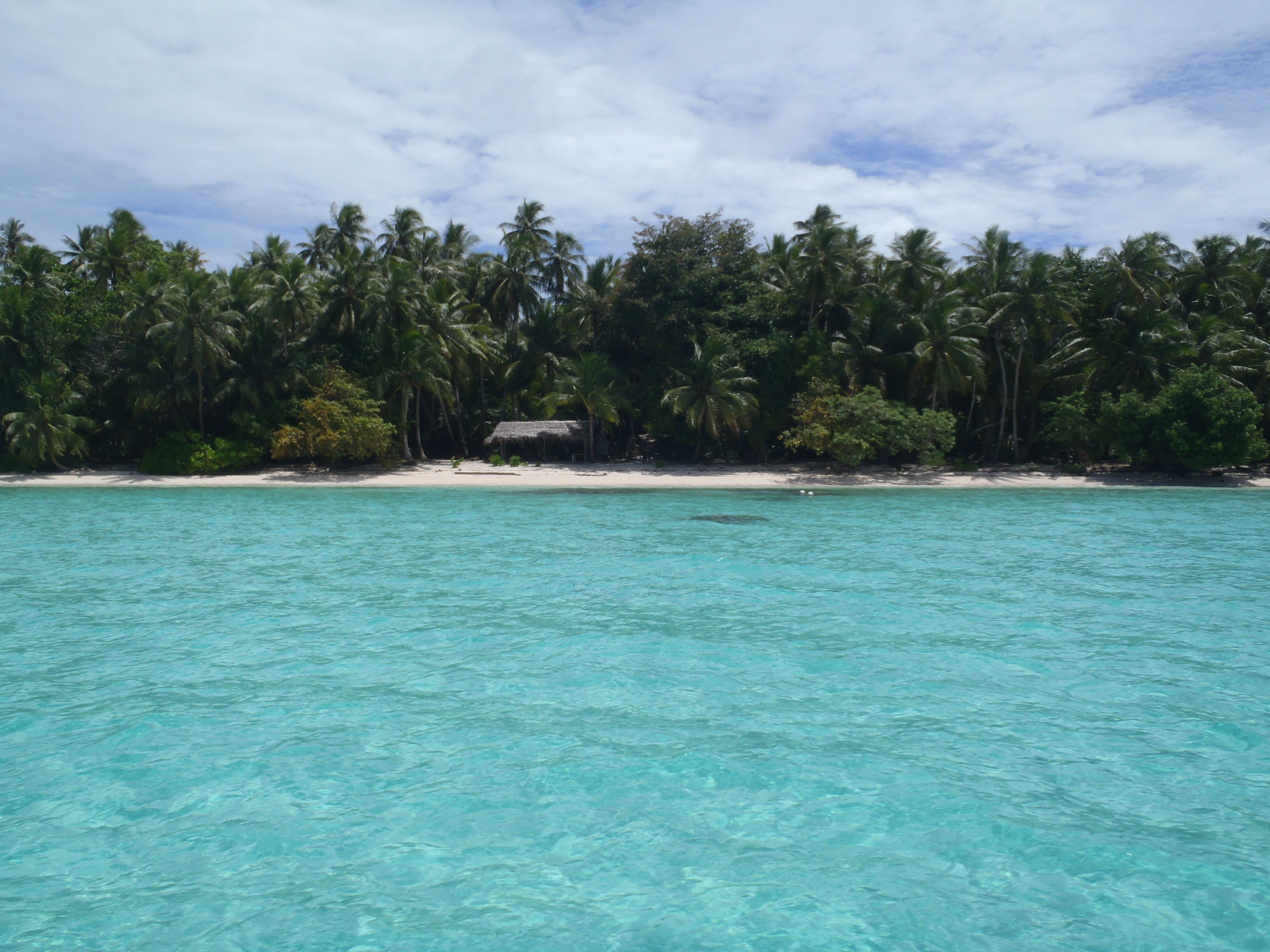
Inside the lagoon of Ant Atoll, southwest of Pohnpei

The state of Pohnpei is located in the Pacific Ocean near the eastern end of the Caroline Islands. It is approximately midway between Honolulu and Manila. The land area of Pohnpei state is about 345 square kilometers (133.2 square miles).

Pohnpei's outer islands are low islands, and include Pingelap, Mokil, Ant, Pakin, Ngatik, Nukuoro, Oroluk, and Kapingamarangi; also included is the largely submerged Minto Reef.

With the exception of coastal plains, talus slopes and alluvial fans, most of Pohnpei Island, a volcanic island, is ruggedly mountainous, lush and verdant, with the highest peak at 791 meters (2,595 ft). Its rainforest is dense and rich; extensive mangrove swamps line much of the low shore. The island is roughly circular in outline, its 130-kilometer (80 mi) coast surrounded by coral reef.

=== Municipalities ===
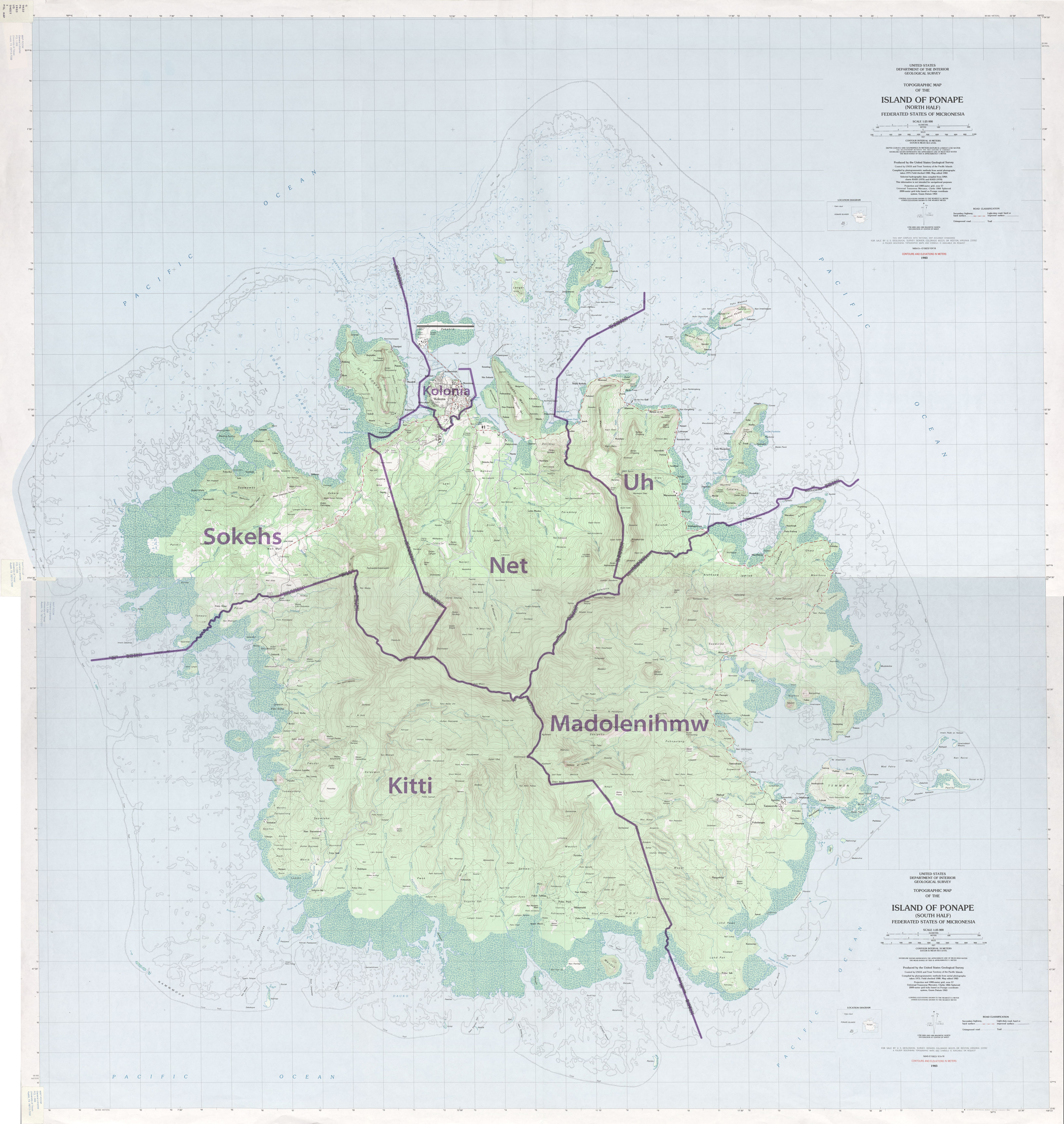
Municipalities on Pohnpei Island

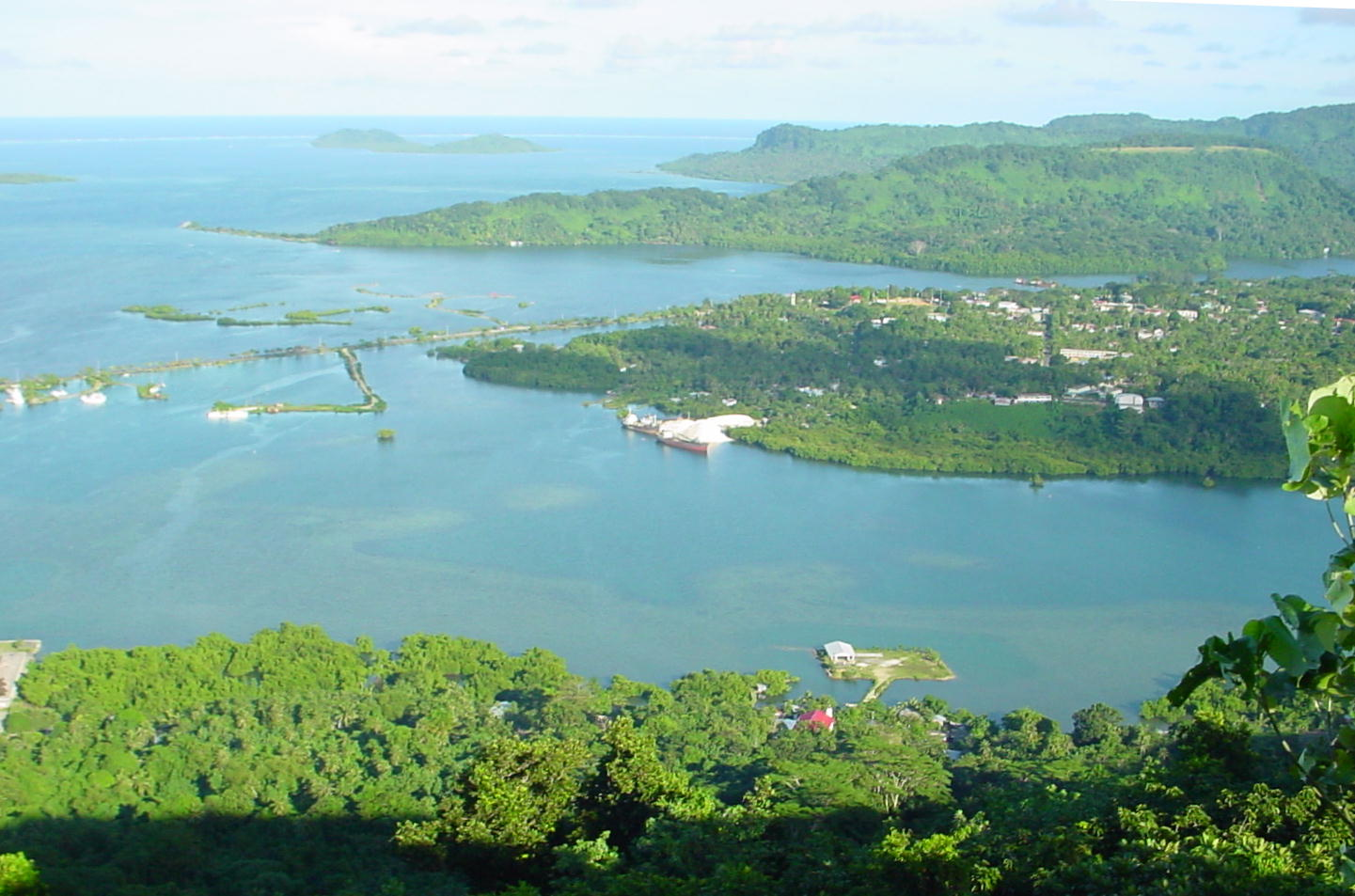
Kolonia, Pohnpei State

These are listed with their populations at the 2010 Census:

- Pohnpei Proper (34,789)
  - Madolenihmw (5,767)
  - Nett (6,639)
  - Sokehs (6,647)
  - Kitti (6,470)
  - Kolonia (6,074)
  - U (3,192)
- Outer islands (1,407)
  - Mwoakilloa (or Mokil) (183)
  - Pingelap (258)
  - Sapwuahfik (formerly Ngatik) (456)
  - Nukuoro (210)
  - Kapingamarangi (350)
  - Oroluk (since 1985 part of Sokehs Municipality) (no population)

== Politics and government ==
The State of Pohnpei is one of the four federal states of the Federated States of Micronesia. As a democratic federation, each state has the ability to retain large number of power within the state as well as a certain level of sovereignty typical of federal states. The chief executive of Pohnpei is the governor. Pohnpei has a unicameral legislature.

== Education ==
Pohnpei State Department of Education operates public schools.

Public high schools:

- Nanpei Memorial High School (also known as Kitti High School)
- Madolenihmw High School
- Bailey Olter High School (formerly Pohnpei Island Central School) in Kolonia

Private schools:

- Calvary Christian Academy in Kolonia
- Ohwa Christian High School in Madolenihmw
- Our Lady of Mercy Catholic High School in Kolonia
- Seventh Day Adventist High School in Kolonia
