= Education in the Federated States of Micronesia =

Education in the Federated States of Micronesia is required for citizens aged 6 to 14 (or 1st to 8th grade), and is important to their economy. The literacy rate for citizens aged 15 to 24 is 98.8%.

The national education agency is the FSM Department of Education. Each state has its own education agency operating public schools.

- Chuuk State Department of Education
- Kosrae State Department of Education
- Pohnpei State Department of Education
- Yap State Department of Education

The College of Micronesia is the tertiary institution which serves the country.

== History ==
Before Micronesia became a set of colonial territories, education was rarely distinguished from daily life, and children were educated through everyday experiences. During the 17th century, Spanish influence changed the Micronesian learning paradigm to a school-based structure. Early Spanish schools were primarily oriented toward providing a religious education to Micronesian children, and teachers would encourage attendance by offering small prizes, such as candy or holy cards, as a reward. Instruction was often the domain of missionaries.

In 1899, Micronesia (which at this point included some territories outside of what is currently the Federated States of Micronesia) passed into German control, and this influenced the educational system as well. The Germans brought with them their cultural emphasis on the importance of secular public schooling, and although much education was still left to missionaries, a public school was opened on Saipan and a police training program was instated on Palau.

The Japanese brought their strict model of education to Micronesia in 1914. They strongly emphasized the Japanese language, as they believed that this would serve as a gateway for students to Japanese culture, which they believed would provide children with "the blessings of advanced civilization".

Following World War II, the United States took control of Micronesia as a trust territory, leaving their own mark on Micronesian education. In contrast to the approach of the previous colonizers, the US nominally sought to allow Micronesians to adapt education to their own cultural needs. However, the American and European concept of a liberal education is based upon the development of independent thinking and individual accomplishment, a concept which is not emphasized in the more community-based Micronesian cultures, where decision-making and accomplishments are often done in groups. The Micronesian emphasis on community also prioritizes family needs over attendance, and it is not unusual for schools to close due to community events or children to stay home if necessary for their families.

In the 1960s, the American administration redoubled its efforts to bring education to every Micronesian child. By the end of the decade, each district had its own high school, and nearly every elementary-aged child attended school. US per-student expenditures on Micronesian students nearly quintupled from $50 at the beginning of the decade to the $240 at the end. At first, American teachers were sent to the island, but Peace Corps volunteers eventually replaced them. The foreign teachers limited the ability of the US to realize its stated goal of helping Micronesians adapt their educational system to their culture. In addition, courses were carried out in English. When education was turned over to Micronesians themselves, some teachers lacked the English ability to teach the material, which led in some cases to poorer education in both English and other subjects.

As of 2022, most pre-primary, primary, and secondary school teachers are qualified to teach by the FSM's definition. 90% of all teachers possess the minimum criteria for this, an Associate of Arts degree. The teacher qualification rate for private schools is much lower than the general rate, at approximately 75%.

== Non-mainstream schooling ==
Micronesian national law includes a provision for a gifted and talented program, to be designed and implemented by each of the states. The curriculum shall "maintain a balance between Micronesian culture and tradition, and international or non-Micronesian learning and technologies, so that the benefits of exceptional opportunities do not come at the expense of cultural alienation."

National law also states that each of Micronesia's member states must provide children with disabilities with education until 12th grade or age 21.

Homeschooling is permitted, as long as it meets the minimum educational requirements set forth by the Secretary of Education. The Secretary of Education and the State Boards of Education are required to monitor all home study programs, and may revoke their approval of a given program at any time with reasonable grounds.

== See also ==
- Rose Mackwelung
