= Palikir =

Capital city of the Federated States of Micronesia

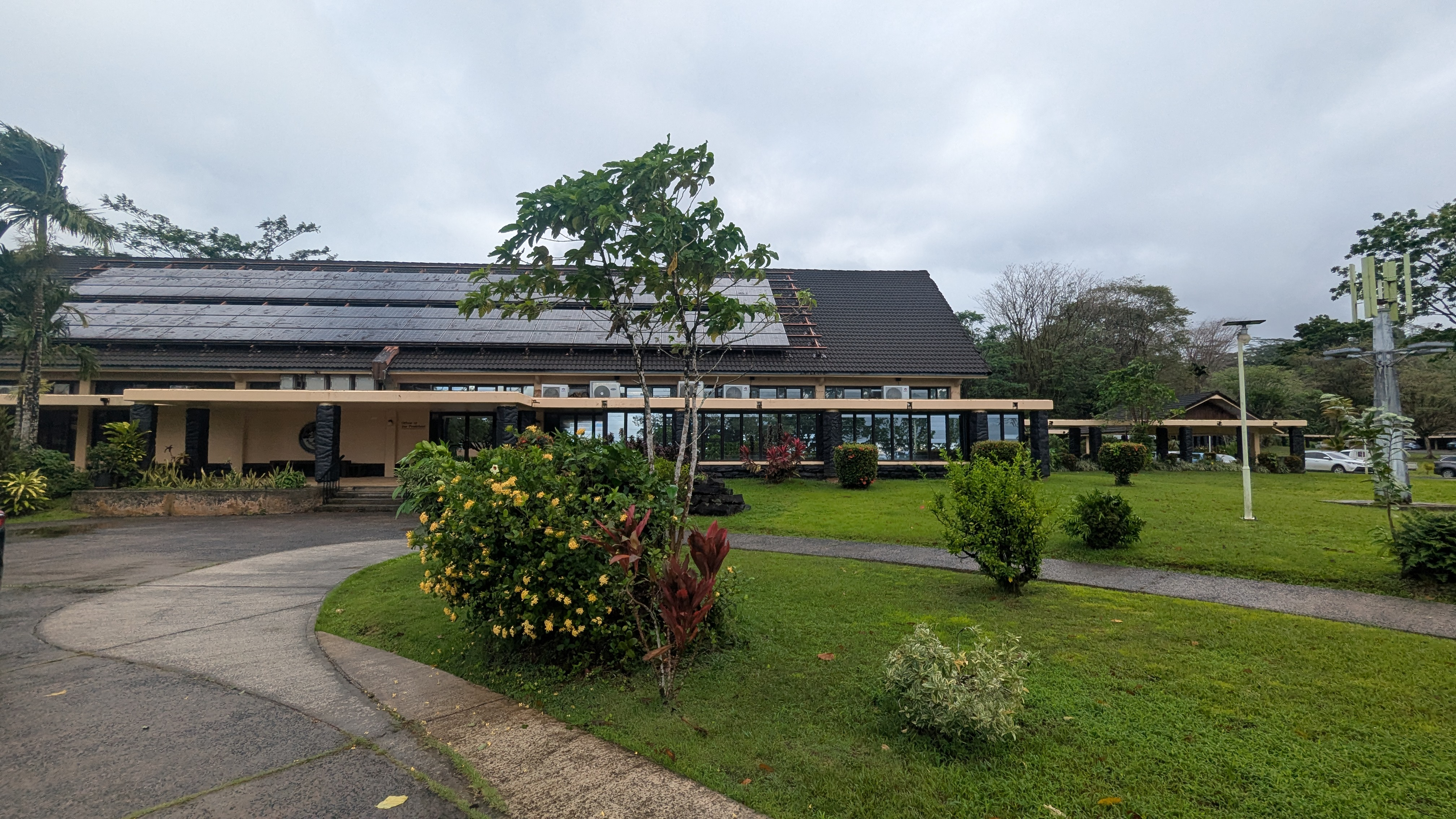
- Office of the President of the Federated States of Micronesia in Palikir

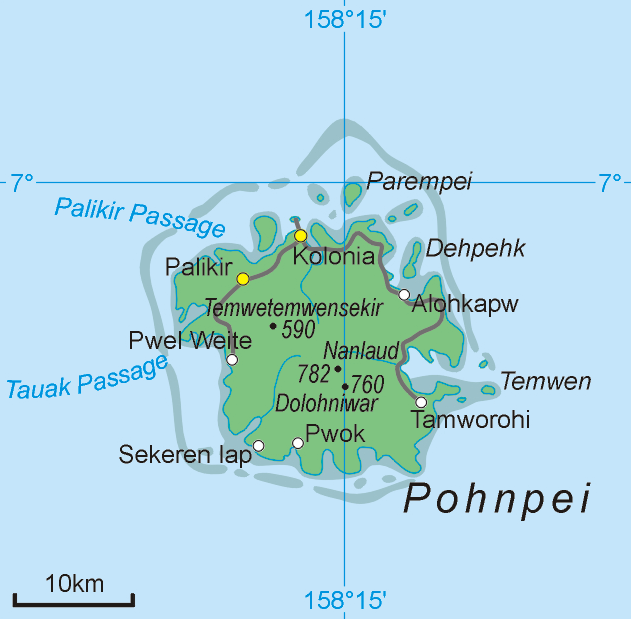
- Palikir (in north-western side) within the island of Pohnpei
- Coordinates: 6°55′2″N 158°9′32″E
- Country: F.S. Micronesia
- State: Pohnpei State
- Municipality: Sokehs

Population (2024 estimate)
  - Total: 6,964
- Time zone: UTC+11
- Climate: Af

Palikir (/ˈpælɪkɪər/) is the capital city of the Federated States of Micronesia located in the western Pacific Ocean. A town of slightly above 5,000 residents, it is part of the larger Sokehs municipality, which had a population of 6,964 as of 2024, out of the nation's total population of 106,487. It is situated on the northwest side of Pohnpei island (population 34,789), a high volcanic island surrounded by a fringing coral reef. Nearby to the northeast is the island's largest settlement, the coastal town of Kolonia. It was declared the capital of Micronesia in 1989.

== History ==
Pohnpei was ruled by tribal chiefs in ancient times. Palikir was formerly a tiny village of little consequence. The island of Pohnpei was encountered by the Portuguese and Spanish in the 15th century, but colonial settlement did not occur until 1886 by the Spanish. Later Germany attained the Caroline Islands via purchase from Spain at the end of the Spanish–American War in 1898. During World War I control passed to the Japanese. During World War II, the Japanese built an airport near Kolonia. Subsequent to World War II, the island was administered by the United States Government until FSM attained independence in 1979. The government of the Federated States of Micronesia decided to convert the Palikir area into a town to house the central administration of the islands as a purpose built capital city. It was declared the capital of Micronesia in 1989. US aid of US$15 million was made available to develop the site into a modern town. All government offices, some residential houses, and the residence of the President of the Federated States of Micronesia were built. It is now the hub of the federal administration of the country, despite still being a village with a population of 4,645.

== Geography ==
Palikir is located in the northwestern center of Pohnpei Island (formerly known as Ponape). Geologically the island terrain consists of high mountains to low coral atolls. It is the largest, highest, wettest and most scenic island of the Federated States of Micronesia. Palikir is 8 kilometers (5 miles) southwest of Kolonia, which is Pohnpei's largest town and state capital of Pohnpei State. Underwater reefs are found all round the coastal region of the island. 9 kilometers (6 miles) to the southeast, Mount Nanlaud is the highest point of the Federated States of Micronesia and of Pohnpei at 2,566 feet (782 m) as indicated on the definitive USGS 1:25,000 scale topographic survey. Palikir is surrounded by heavily wooded forest.

== Climate ==
Palikir features a tropical rainforest climate under the Köppen climate classification. Common to many areas with this climate, Palikir sees very little variance in its temperatures during the course of the year, averaging roughly 27 °C (81 °F) daily throughout the year. The town experiences heavy rainfall year-round; on average 5,202 millimeters (204.8 in) of rain falls annually, making it the wettest capital in the world.

Climate data for Palikir
Month	Jan	Feb	Mar	Apr	May	Jun	Jul	Aug	Sep	Oct	Nov	Dec	Year
Mean daily maximum °C (°F)	29.9 (85.8)	30.0 (86.0)	30.2 (86.4)	30.2 (86.4)	30.3 (86.5)	30.4 (86.7)	30.6 (87.1)	30.8 (87.4)	30.9 (87.6)	30.9 (87.6)	30.7 (87.3)	30.3 (86.5)	30.4 (86.8)
Daily mean °C (°F)	26.8 (80.2)	26.9 (80.4)	27.1 (80.8)	26.9 (80.4)	26.9 (80.4)	26.8 (80.2)	26.6 (79.9)	26.7 (80.1)	26.8 (80.2)	26.8 (80.2)	26.8 (80.2)	27.0 (80.6)	26.8 (80.3)
Mean daily minimum °C (°F)	23.8 (74.8)	23.9 (75.0)	24.0 (75.2)	23.7 (74.7)	23.6 (74.5)	23.3 (73.9)	22.7 (72.9)	22.6 (72.7)	22.7 (72.9)	22.7 (72.9)	22.9 (73.2)	23.7 (74.7)	23.3 (74.0)
Average precipitation mm (inches)	377 (14.8)	279 (11.0)	353 (13.9)	462 (18.2)	502 (19.8)	464 (18.3)	504 (19.8)	515 (20.3)	464 (18.3)	469 (18.5)	421 (16.6)	392 (15.4)	5,202 (204.9)
Source: Climate-Data.org

== Demographics ==
The nationality of the people is Micronesian with the most common ethnicities being Chuukese, Kosraeans, Pohnpeian, and Yapese. English is the common and official language while each of the major islands have their own local language such as Chuukese, Kosraean, Pohnpeian, and Yapese. 96% of the population is Christian with Roman Catholicism being the majority religion at over 50% of the population. The city has been categorized as having a "high degree of hardship with a typical hardship premium of 30%" from an international perspective.

== Administration ==
Since 1989, Palikir has been the federal capital of the Federated States of Micronesia (FSM), which attained independence from, and remains since in free association with, the United States in May 1979. FSM has a constitutional government headed by a president.

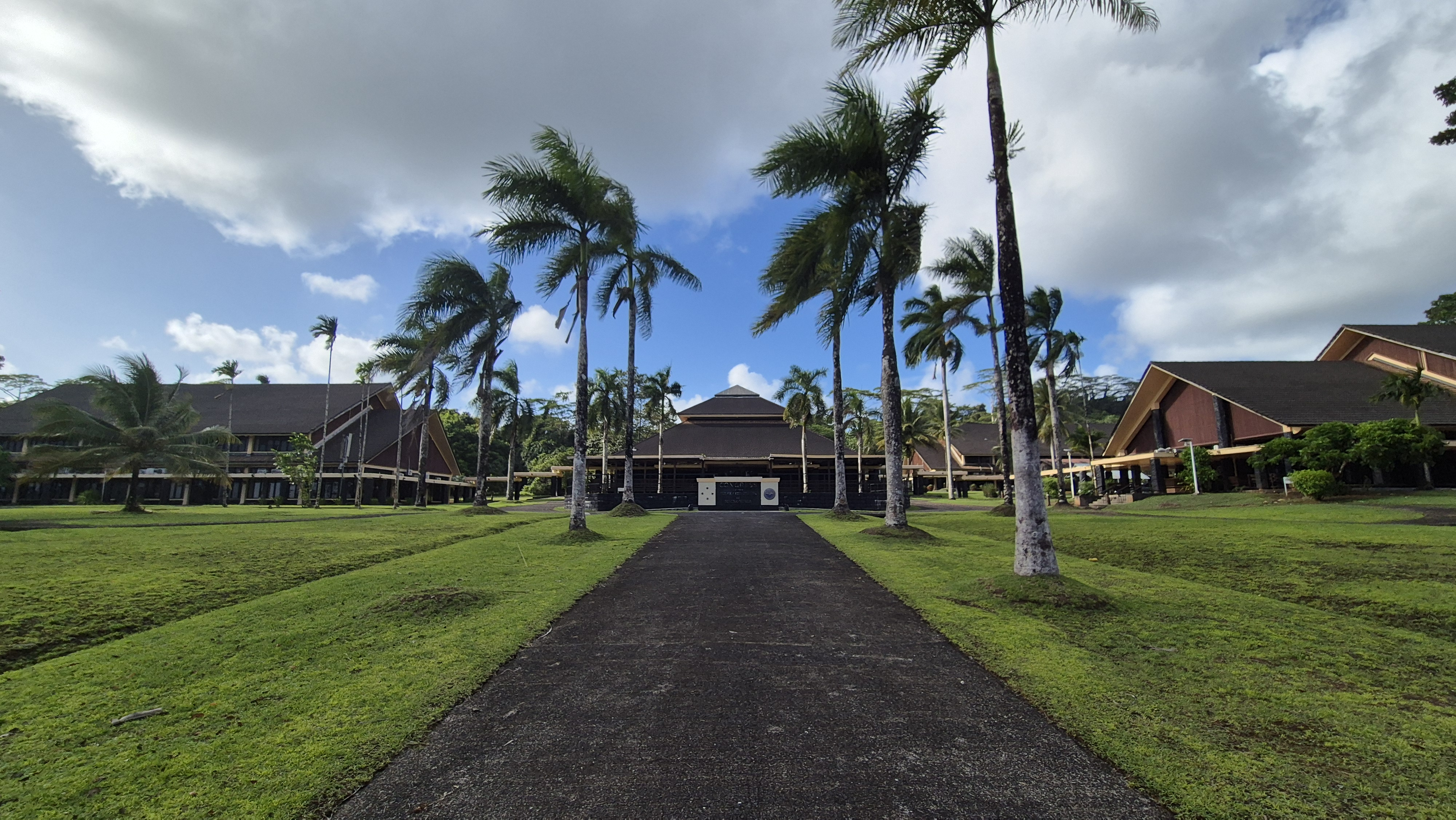
Government Buildings: Right Supreme Court, Center Congress, Left Post Office

== Economy ==
The economy of the capital city is reflected in the economic resources of the FSM Islands (600 islands, atolls and islets (including Pohnpei Island)) as a whole. The economy of the island consists basically of subsistence farming and fishing (fish processing and aquaculture). Tropical agricultural and plantation products like copra, breadfruit, taro, betel nuts, sweet potatoes, cassava, tropical fruits and vegetables, trochus shells, cacao and rice are produced. Livestock, such as pigs and poultry, are raised. Products such as fish, bananas, black pepper, and garments are mainly exported to Japan. Food, manufactured goods, machinery and equipment, and beverages are imported.

The country is independent, but in fact depends on financial support stemming from its Compact of Free Association with the US. As of 2012 the inflation rate was 2% and the cost of living (for imported goods) in Palikir is reportedly very high in comparison with other places in the world.

== Education ==
Pohnpei State Department of Education operates public schools:

- Palikir Elementary School

Bailey Olter High School (former Pohnpei Island Central School or PICS) in Kolonia serves students from Sokehs.

== Notable people ==
- Emelihter Kihleng, poet
- Bailey Olter, politician

== Transportation ==
Pohnpei International Airport is close to Kolonia.
