= Mokil Atoll =

Atoll in the Federated States of Micronesia

Mwoakilloa
- Municipality
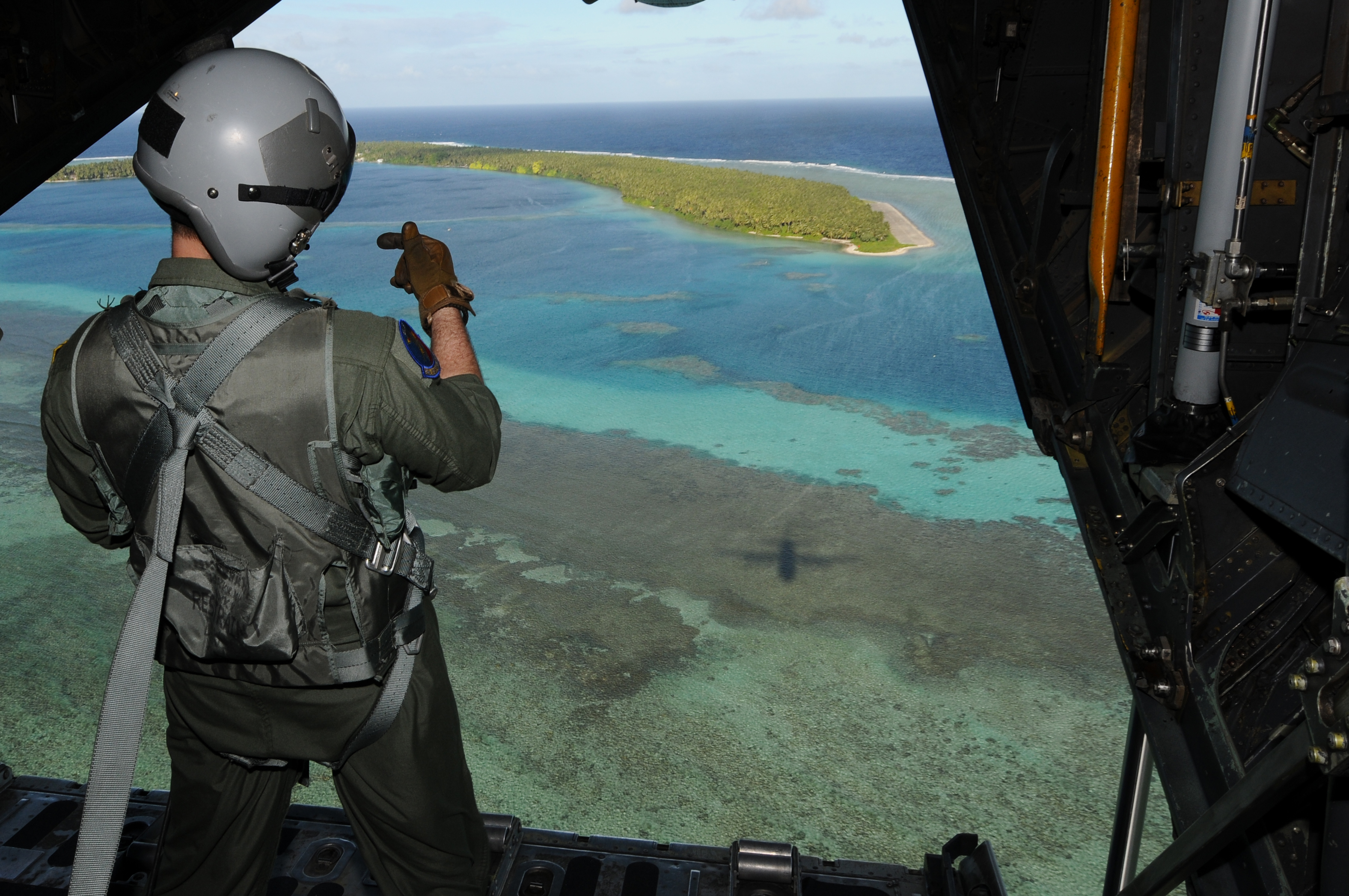
- Landscape of Mwoakilloa

- Flag Seal

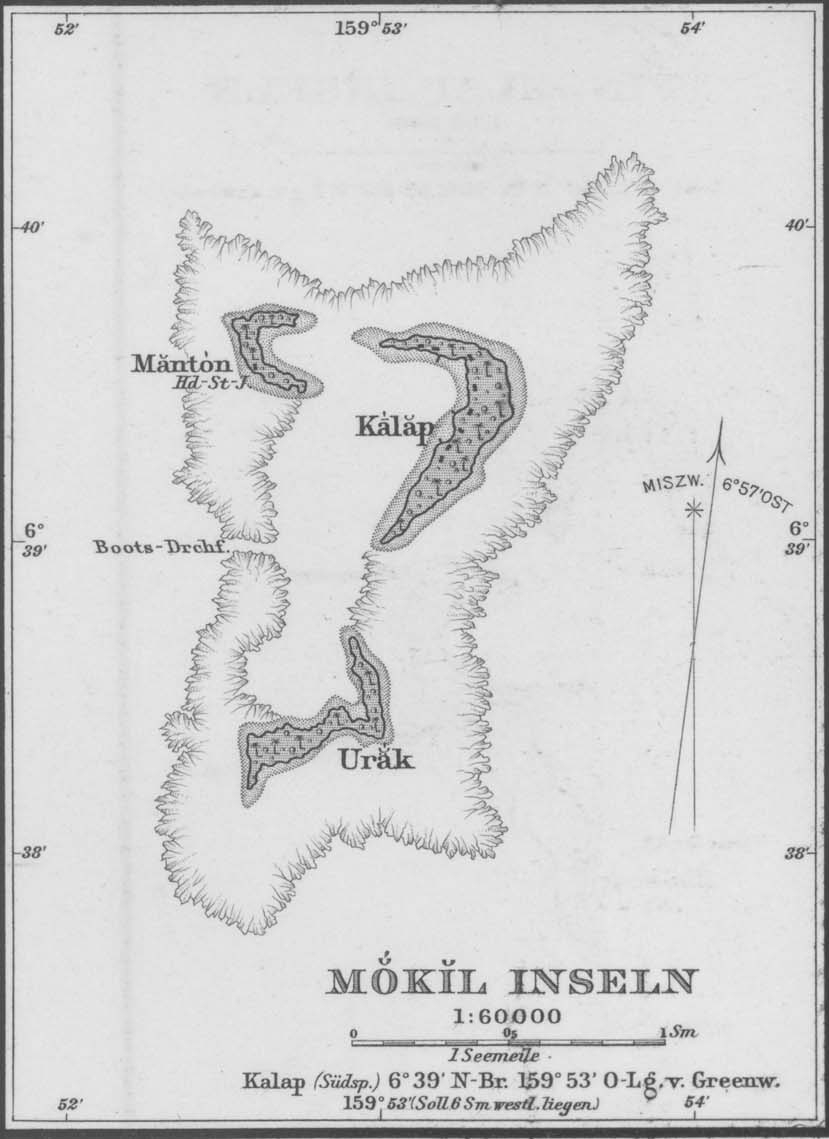
- Map of Mokil Atoll
- Coordinates: 6°40′N 159°46′E
- Country: Federated States of Micronesia
- State: Pohnpei State

Area
  - Land: 1.24 km^{2} (0.48 sq mi)

Population (2008)
  - Total: 147
- Demonym: Mokilese

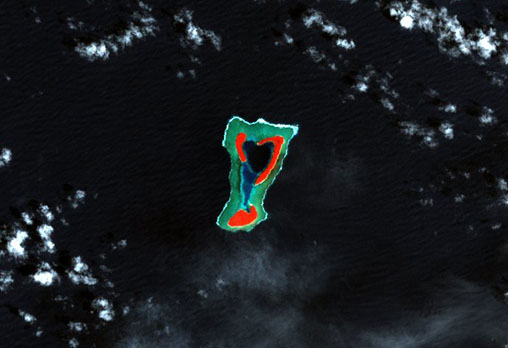
Satellite image of Mokil Atoll

Mwoakilloa (or Mokil, previously named Wellington Island or Duperrey Island, after Louis Isidore Duperrey) is an inhabited atoll in the central Pacific Ocean. Geographically, it belongs to the Caroline Islands and is a municipality of the outlying islands of Pohnpei State of the Federated States of Micronesia.

Mwoakilloa lies 153 kilometres east of Pohnpei and approximately 113 kilometres northwest of Pingelap. The almost-rectangular atoll is 4.5 kilometres long and 2.8 kilometres broad. The atoll consists of the three islands Uhrek, Kahlap (Capitol), and Mwandohn, forming a central lagoon of approximately 2 square kilometres in area. Only the northeast island Kahlap is inhabited, with the town facing the lagoon. The total area of all islands is approximately 1.24 square kilometres.

The population of Mwoakilloa decreased from 177 in 2000 to 147 in 2008. The inhabitants speak Mokilese — similar to the Pohnpeian language in the family of Micronesian languages.

The name "Wellington Island" comes from the vessel Marquis of Wellington, whose captain named the island after his vessel. The Marquis of Wellington was on her way to China, having transported 200 or so convicts to Port Jackson, Australia, from Britain.

The atoll is home to a local narrative of a Princess Eti, who could speak in many tongues and communicated with the first French explorers to the island.

== Transportation ==
Mokil Atoll Airfield
- IATA: none; ICAO: none

Summary
- Airport type: Public
- Owner: Government
- Operator: Civil Government
- Serves: Kahlap
- Interactive map of Mokil Atoll Airfield

Runways
Direction	Length		Surface
Direction	ft	m	Surface
	1,200	370	Concrete

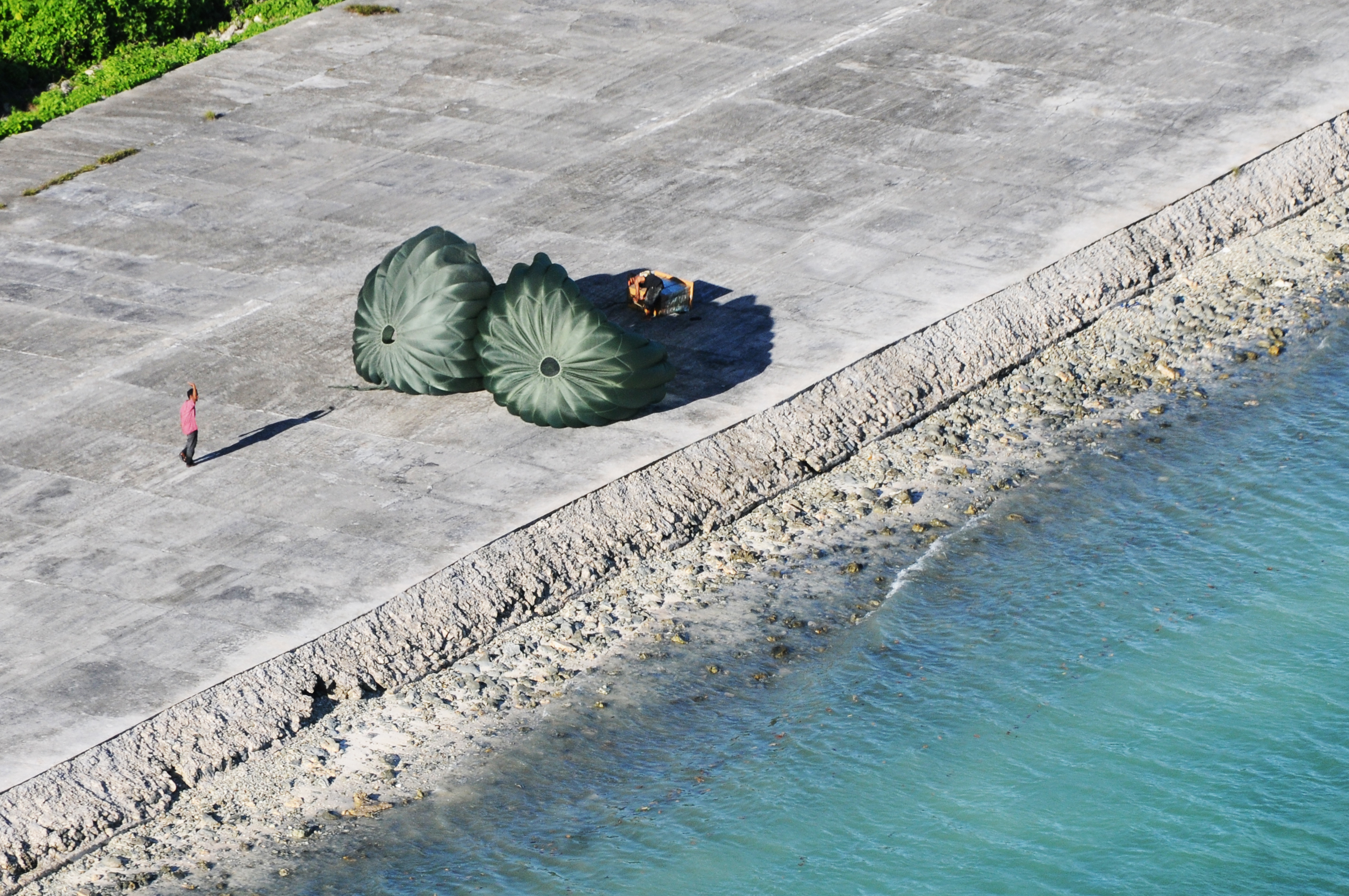
A resident of Mokil Atoll waves to the C-130 crew after receiving an air dropped aid package during Operation Christmas Drop, 2012.

Mokil Airfield is located on the southern end of Kahlap with a 1,200-foot (370 m) runway. The airfield offers no service and used by chartered flights by Caroline Islands Air.

== Bibliography ==
- Statoids.com, retrieved December 8, 2010
