= Pingelap =

Pingelap Pingelap Atoll
- Atoll
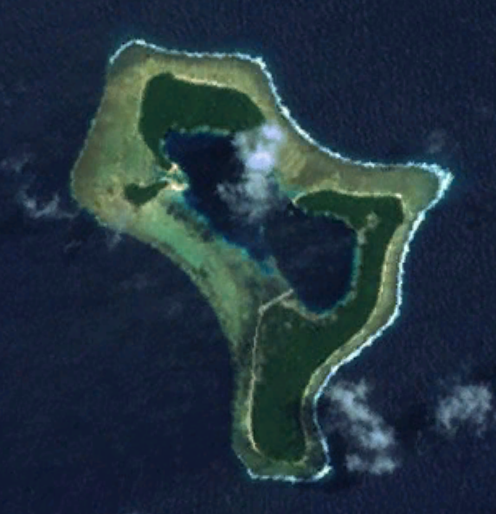
- A satellite image of the Pingelap atoll at low-tide. The pale strip in the center is the airstrip.

- Location of Pingelap in the Pacific Pingelap (Pacific Ocean)
- Coordinates: 6°13′5″N 160°42′10″E
- Country: Micronesia
- State: Pohnpei

Area
  - Land: 1.8 km^{2} (0.69 sq mi)

Dimensions
  - Width: 4 km (2.5 mi)

Population
  - Total: 250

Pingelap is an atoll in the Pacific Ocean, part of Pohnpei State of the Federated States of Micronesia, consisting of three islands: Pingelap Island, Sukoru and Daekae, linked by a reef system and surrounding a central lagoon, although only Pingelap Island is inhabited. The entire system has a land area of 1.8 km² (455 acres) at high-tide, and is less than 2.5 miles (4.0 km) at its widest point. The atoll has its own language, Pingelapese, spoken by most of the atoll's 250 residents.

== History ==
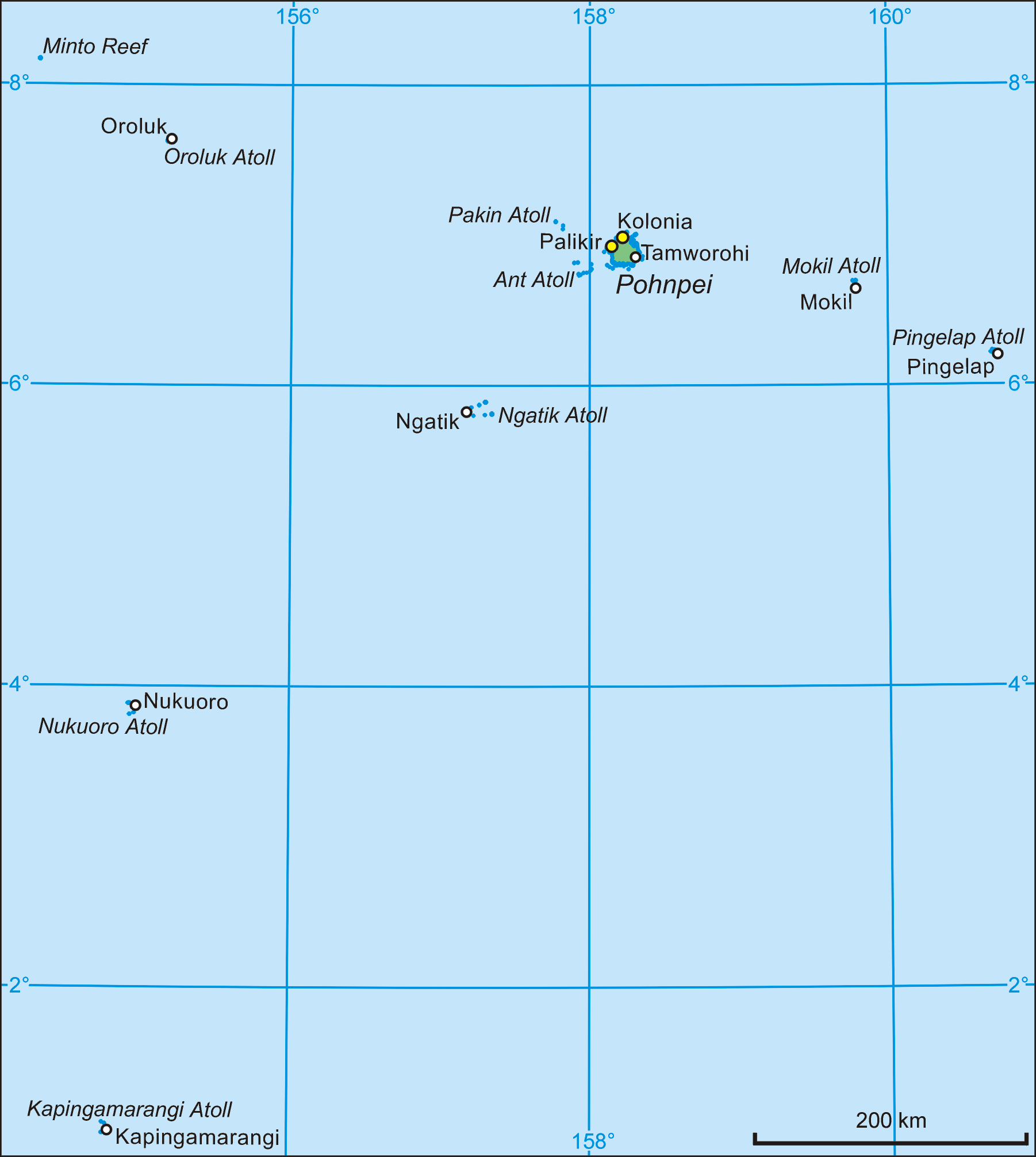
A map of the Pohnpei region. Pingelap is at the eastern edge of the map.

The first European observer of the islands was Captain Thomas Musgrave in the ship Sugar Cane. Captain MacAskill in Lady Barlow revisited them in 1809. Errors in measurement of their location resulted in the islands being separately named on charts in the 19th century as the Musgrave Islands and the MacAskill islands, within the Caroline archipelago.

Historically, the Ouwa or the Paramount Chief or King of Pikelap which is a hereditary title that granted supreme rule of the land, ruled the island of Pikelap which is now known as Pingelap. Japan seized the atoll in October 1914, following the start of World War I. The hereditary system remained in place during Japanese rule, although the title was renamed "Island Magistrate".

Japan used the southern part of Pingelap Island during hostilities in the Pacific Ocean theater of World War II for a supply base. Allied Forces later attacked it. The presence of foreign troops on the island led to the introduction of a number of infectious diseases, including gonorrhoea, tuberculosis and dysentery, which reduced the population from its pre-war level of around 1000 to 800, and decreased the fertility rate significantly.

The arrival of the U.S. Navy in 1945 resulted in the setting up of a democratically elected system alongside the traditional system, which gradually weakened in power. Universal primary education was provided for Pingelapese children and a limited health care scheme was set up to eradicate the diseases introduced during the war.

During the 1960s, the Peace Corps and U.S. Air Force settled on the main island. The U.S. Air Force constructed a missile watching station in the northeast of the island and a pier, with work beginning in 1978 on an airstrip, jutting into the lagoon, on the main island. The runway was finished in 1982, and currently Caroline Islands Air makes two or three flights daily to and from the atoll.

== Climate ==
Pingelap enjoys a tropical climate, with even, warm temperatures throughout the year. The NOAA estimated an average daily temperature range of 24-32˚C (75.2-89.6˚F) in 2018.

Precipitation is generally plentiful, with heavy year-round rainfall.

Pingelap, Pohnpei, Federated States of Micronesia elevation 8 feet (2.4 m)

Climate chart (precipitation, max. and min. temperature)
J	F	M	A	M	J	J	A	S	O	N	D
13 89 74	10 90 75	13 90 74	12 90 74	13 90 75	13 90 74	13 90 74	13 90 74	14 90 74	12 90 74	13 90 74	13 89 75
- █ Average max. and min. temperatures in °F
- █ Precipitation totals in inches
- Source: 1981-2010 provisional normals
Metric conversion
J	F	M	A	M	J	J	A	S	O	N	D
323 32 23	265 32 24	318 32 24	314 32 23	336 32 24	329 32 24	333 32 23	332 32 23	362 32 23	315 32 24	332 32 23	328 32 24
- █ Average max. and min. temperatures in °C
- █ Precipitation totals in mm

== Total color blindness ==
A significant proportion of the population has complete achromatopsia due to total absence of working cones in their retinas, leaving them with only rods, a recessive genetic disorder that causes total color blindness in sufferers. This condition is known on the island as maskun, meaning literally "not see" in Pingelapese.

Complete achromatopsia is normally a very rare condition, and its prevalence on the island has been traced back to a population bottleneck in 1775 after a catastrophic typhoon swept through the island, leaving only about 20 survivors. One of these, Doahkaesa Mwanenihsed (the ruler at that time), is now believed to have been a carrier for the underlying genetic condition, but the achromatopsia disorder did not appear until the fourth generation after the typhoon, by which time 2.7% of the Pingelapese were affected. Since achromatopsia is an autosomal recessive disorder, inbreeding between the descendants of Doahkaesa Mwanenised would result in an increased recessive allele frequency. By generation six, the incidence rose to approximately 4.9%, due to the founder effect and inbreeding, with all achromats on the island nowadays tracing their ancestry to Doahkaesa Mwanenihsed.

Today the atoll is still of particular interest to geneticists; due to the small gene pool and rapid population growth, the disorder is now prevalent in almost 10% of the population, with a further 30% being unaffected carriers. (By comparison, in the United States, only 1 in 33,000, or 0.003%, are affected). Leading neurologist Oliver Sacks's 1997 book The Island of the Colorblind references the island.

It is reported that one Pingelapese island sea-fisherman with this condition has difficulty seeing in bright sunlight, but at night can see in much fainter light than people with normal vision can; he uses this ability in a boat at night waving a large burning torch about to attract or confuse flying fish, which he then catches; the flying fish act as if the torch is the moon. When Sanne De Wilde was photographing the island, she said that red was the most common color the islanders claimed to "see". Despite green being one of the colors they are least able to recognize, many described it as their favorite color, which De Wilde attributed to their love of the jungle vegetation.
