= Tortoiseshell =

Mottled, flexible, brownish material made from the shells of turtles

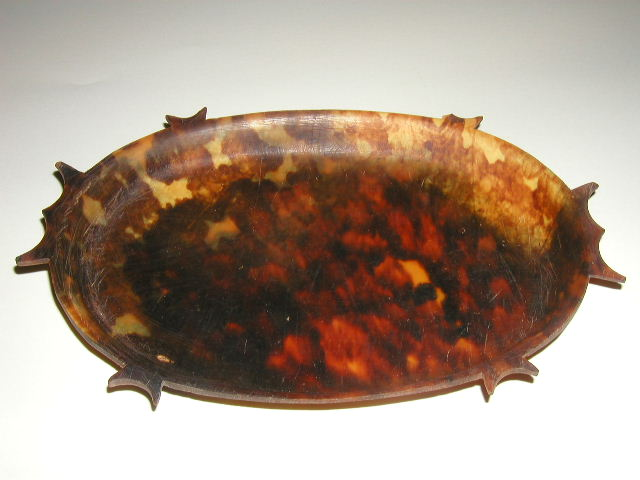
Palauan Toluk made from tortoiseshell

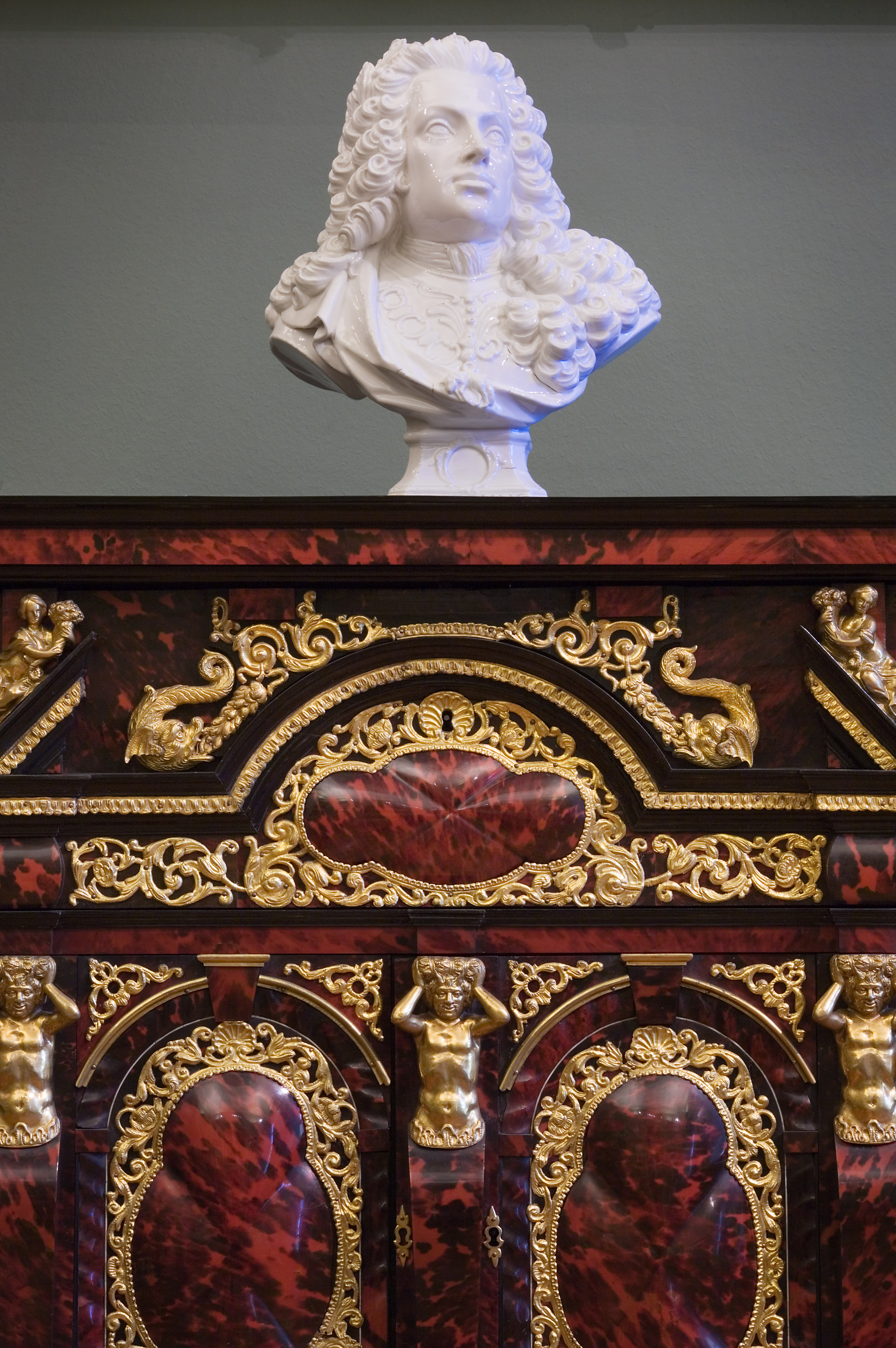
Cabinet with tortoiseshell veneers

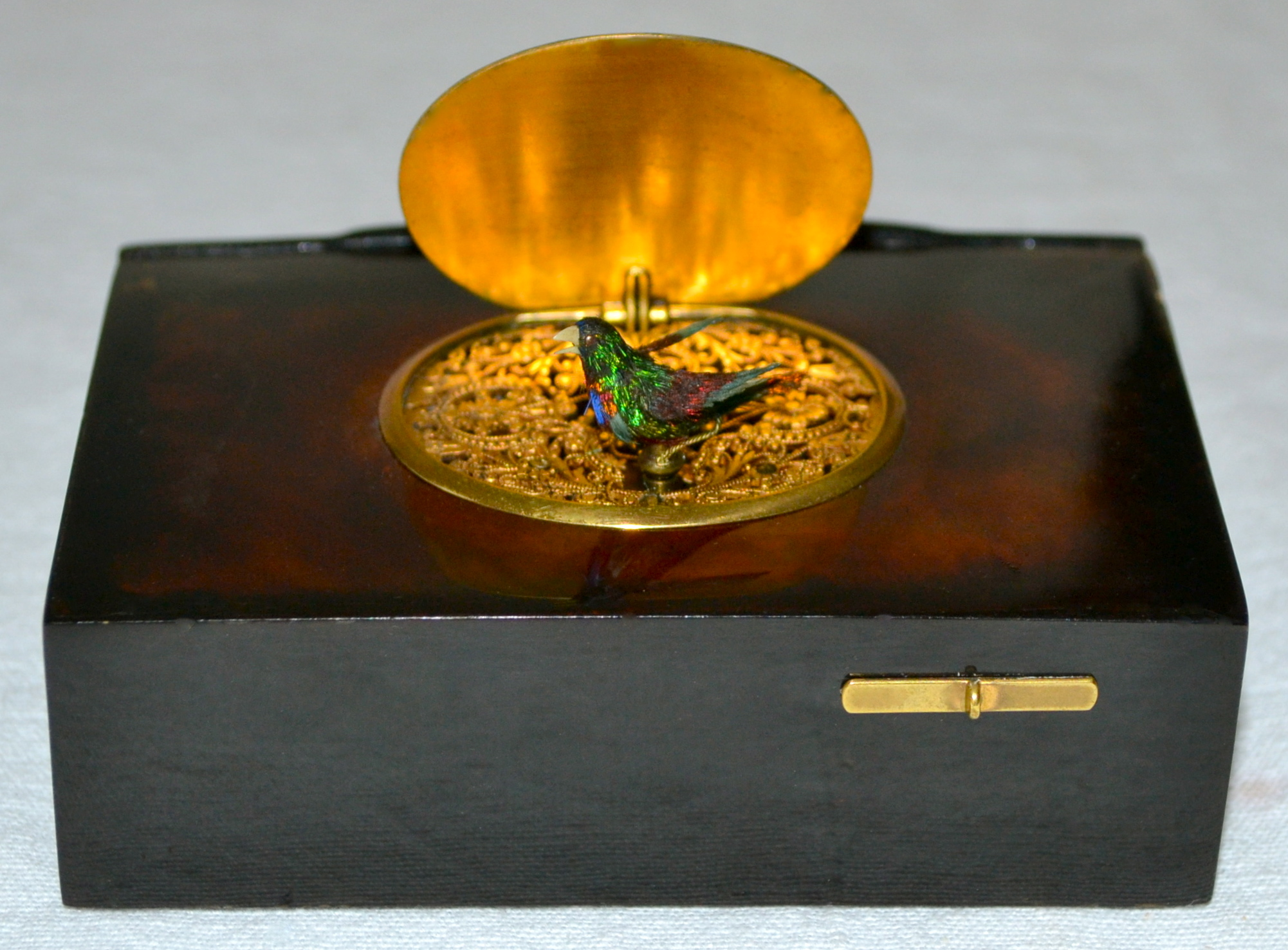
French singing bird box with a case made out of tortoiseshell.

Tortoiseshell or tortoise shell is a material produced from the shells of the larger species of tortoise and turtle, mainly the hawksbill sea turtle, which is a critically endangered species according to the IUCN Red List largely because of its exploitation for this trade. The large size, fine color, and unusual form of the hawksbill's scutes make it especially suitable. The distinctive patterning is referred to in names such as the tortoiseshell cat, several breeds of guinea pig, and the common names of several species of the butterfly genera Nymphalis and Aglais, and some other uses.

== Uses ==
Tortoiseshell was widely used from ancient times in Europe, North America, and Asia until the trade was banned in most countries in the 1970s. It was used, normally in thin slices or pieces, in the manufacture of a wide variety of items such as combs, small boxes and frames, inlays in furniture (known as Boulle work carried out by André-Charles Boulle), and other items: frames for spectacles, guitar picks and knitting needles. Despite being expensive, tortoiseshell was attractive to manufacturers and consumers because of its beautiful mottled appearance, its durability, and its organic warmth against the skin.

The initial processing involved separating the layers of the scutes from the animal's carapace by heating, softening the plates by boiling them in salt water and flattening them under a press. Two pieces could be fused by use of a hot iron, but like the earlier stages, great care had to be taken not to lose the color. Finishing and polishing was done by various techniques mainly in Europe or in the U.S.

Another method used by the Malays during the Raj of Sarawak era was to rub the shell with coconut oil, then suspend the animal over a slow fire for 15 minutes until the plates were peeled off. The animal was then coated with tar to protect it from the sharks and returned to its natural environment. The tortoiseshells were then graded according to their colour and were used to manufacture combs, buttons and brooches.

Craftsmen in various Asian countries have also perfected this art.

== Availability ==
In 1973, international trade of tortoiseshell among many countries was banned under CITES (the Convention on International Trade in Endangered Species). The ban came into force in 1975, and more countries joined CITES over the years, although Japan took an exception to the ban until 1992. The material was already often imitated in stained horn, plastic like cellulose acetate, and other materials. The synthetic Delrin has been used especially for guitar picks.

Brands of synthetic substitutes for tortoiseshell include Tortoloid and Tor-tis.

== History ==
Tortoiseshell has been used since ancient times, and the ancient Greek chelys or lyre often used a whole shell to form its body. Inlaid veneers of tortoiseshell were popular with wealthy ancient Romans for furniture, especially couches for dining, and for small items. The Periplus of the Erythraean Sea, probably a work of the 1st century AD, distinguishes between shell from different species, with the best regarded as the hawksbill.

André Charles Boulle (1642–1732), cabinetmaker to Louis XIV of France, introduced or perfected marquetry combining thin inlays of tortoiseshell backed with metal, with woods and metal, a style still called after him (Boulle work). Small luxury objects such as snuff-boxes were decorated in piqué work, inlays of precious metals and jewels into tortoiseshell (or other materials).

Hopes of capturing a large store of tortoiseshell led to the Ngatik massacre by Australian "beachcombers" of up to 50 men Sapwuahfik in Micronesia in July 1837.
