= D'Andrea Picks =

D'Andrea USA is a manufacturer of plastic instrument picks. Luigi D'Andrea made the first plastic guitar pick out of celluloid in 1922. In October 2007, D'Andrea celebrated 85 years of designing and manufacturing professional guitar picks and music accessories, making it one of the oldest companies in the musical accessory industry.It's also the first company to make custom guitar plectrums.

== Introduction ==
The tonal effect of a musical piece can depend as much on the selection of pick as it does on the choice of strings, amplifiers, effects, or guitar. Many players keep a variety of types and gauges available for varied sounds and playing styles.

== History of the plastic pick ==
Up until 1922, most picks were handmade from real tortoise shell - the carapace of the Atlantic Hawksbill turtle. It provided the finest tonal quality but it had some drawbacks. It was very expensive, had a tendency to break, and was scarce. People had tried other materials such as bone, stone, and ivory but none had been particularly successful.

Luigi D'Andrea punched the little disks out of celluloid by hand, with a heavy mallet and a variety of knife-edged dies which he designed. The cut edges were then finished by hand with sandpaper. He also made the traditional tortoiseshell picks the same way. The real shell came from Europe in irregularly shaped "plates" which were then soaked in oil and pressed between heated stainless steel plates for days. The plates were regularly tightened with a hand wheel. The pick material was then taken off the press hot and cut by hand with a steel die and wooden mallet, to get as many good picks as possible from the irregular plate. They had to work quickly because if the shell cooled or dried out, it would shatter when cut. The edges of the plate made thin picks, further in was medium, and the center supplied the thick gauge. They were then either tumbled or finished by hand on a sanding wheel. Some would have to be re-pressed flat again at the end of this process, for the gauges were never uniform. By comparison, the celluloid process was slightly simpler because the 2'x5', sheets were flat and uniformly gauged. It was readily available in the U.S. until the late 1960s, and only from Italy and Japan.

During this early time, he experimented with different shapes and sizes. Guitarists he knew would visit him, and bring their special needs to his attention: making the picks bigger, smaller, longer, more round, sharper, point two sides, then three. He started numbering the styles. Soon he had created 23 shapes in tortoise and 56 shapes in celluloid. Among them is the #351 which eventually becomes the 'standard' "Fender" pick. One of the oddest was the #84, a combination of 3 #353 picks in thin, medium, and heavy, beveled on one edge, and joined by a rivet. It could be flipped out like a pocket knife to the desired thickness when needed. Because he tried to please so many of the players with modifications to pick styles, most of today's pick innovations were already included in the D'Andrea catalogs of the 1920s.

The problem of holding on to a pick was also addressed. There is a whole line with shaped cork cushion grips, including a heart-shaped grip for a heart pick, in several sizes. One line also had notches in the sides of the picks that held tiny rubber bands. That look became part of the D'Andrea logo from the 1920s to the 1950s. Some picks even had 1/4" holes in the centers for grip. When imprinting became an integral part of pick manufacturing, different "patterns" were embossed for grip. Some styles were struck with a die which embedded tiny ridges in the tops to "corrugate" them. By the 1970s, D'Andrea introduced yet another innovation addressing the grip problem—PRO-GRIP celluloid. This treated the normally polished surface with a resin coating. The shiny pick was now dusty-looking but it stayed put. In the 1990s that treatment was used on the molded Delrin PRO-GRIP BRITES pick line.

By 1928, Luigi D'Andrea was the Henry Ford of guitar picks, with semi-automated equipment to punch, tumble, and imprint as many as 59 differently shaped picks in both celluloid and real tortoise shells. His New York City factory produced flat picks, thumb, and finger picks, pick guards, as well as guitar, bass, sax, accordion & drum bags, and cases.

In the 1930s, Luigi's son Anthony joined the business and began some innovations of his own. Not only the production, but the marketing of picks became his forte. He took his cue from the candy business and secured some surplus compartmentalized boxes with glass tops which he filled with pick assortments. Picks were soon sold by the gross and half gross in 4" square plastic 'jewel' boxes with separate lids. These eventually evolved into the clear plastic compartment boxes we see today. He put picks on cardboard displays, die-cut point-of-purchase counter easels, and pop-up boxes. The 1930s "Nick Lucas" picks on a card were an example of his packaging ideas.

The picks originally made in the 1920s were used on mandolins, banjos, and acoustic guitars. The early blues and jazz players used the picks back then. In the 1950s they were used by early rockers. As more and more folks began playing guitar, the demand grew rapidly. Anthony (Tony, Sr.) then began the search for new materials for picks. Tortoiseshell was hardly available, and by 1975 would be on the endangered list and no longer used. Celluloid was an expensive and difficult material to handle. The lead times were tremendous and erratic. To meet the demand, he introduced a molded nylon pick with circular patterns for grip.

== Tony D'Andrea Jr. ==
In 1962, Tony Sr.'s son, Tony Jr., joined the company. Coming out of the Aircraft industry and familiar with industrial plastics, he pioneered the use of some of the plastics still used in modern picks. A Dupont acetal polymer, Delrin was introduced as the D'Andrea Delrex line. A colorful sheet plastic, it had some of the tonal qualities of celluloid, excellent endurance, but could not be colored in shell patterns. As a sheet plastic, however, it could easily be produced in many shapes. Today, D'Andrea offers it in seven shapes and six gauges. The same material is also able to be molded. So Tony Jr. developed uniquely designed molds to accommodate the needs of the faster-paced music of the Rock revolution. His molds had innovative sharply beveled edges to provide fast release with a clearer tone. Those molds are used to produce the three Delrin lines: Jetex with a multi-leveled gripping surface, and the Brites and Pro-Grip Brites lines with Fluorescent pigmented colors. A new stronger Nylon formula was also developed and used in these sharp-edged molds.

As the "standard" #351 pick emerged as the dominant pick shape, the need for 59 shapes diminished, but Tony wanted to increase its versatility. In 1974, he introduced the 4th and 5th sound: .58mm Thin /Medium and .84mm Medium/Heavy. Today picks come in 8 gauges, up to 2.00mm super heavy. As for shapes, 10 still remain from the early days.

Still, the professionals' favorite for its unique sound quality, the breadth of the celluloid material was necessarily reduced. Because of its constantly increasing cost, many colors have been eliminated. To fill players' need for an economical pick, Tony introduced a polymer plastic, V-Resin. It mimics most celluloid properties, but its lower material cost, domestic availability, and familiar colors make it widely popular. It is available in jewel-like transparent hues and stone patterns. Variations of it are used for several premium pick lines: SPECTRA-PLEC, SPECTRA SHARP-transparent jewel colors, ULTRA PLEC in burled wood, malachite and crystal patterns, and PRO PLEC, a super heavy, rich shell patterned pick in vintage shapes.

Another area of innovation for Tony Jr. has been the pick imprinting process. From the very beginning, simple hot stamping had been used to identify the picks, first with a D'Andrea logo and then simple block letter dies for a player name. These were originally imprinted in one-shot, foot pedal-operated machines. One of the first to make the player imprint popular was Nick Lucas. In the 1930s, using the old round top #351 pick Luigi developed for him, each pick was imprinted with his logo and sold as a "Nick Lucas" pick. The 1950s saw the advent of mass-producing private labeled picks for guitar companies, requiring sophisticated automated printing and packaging. The 1960s was the heyday of rock and every player and store wanted their pick personalized. Tony developed some of the fastest multi-shot equipment for punching, imprinting, and bagging. In the 1990s he revolutionized the imprint process with the introduction of pad printing. It overcame some of the speed and design limitations of hot stamping. Now very intricate logos can be produced by computer generation and they can be multicolored. By 1996, even a photograph could be imprinted on a pick!

== D'Andrea today ==
D'Andrea manufactures twelve D'Andrea brand pick lines, private label picks for many prominent guitar makers, custom imprinted picks for thousands of music retailers worldwide, and most of the veteran and contemporary artists. Among the many endorsees are Al Di Meola, Lee Ritenour, Richie Sambora, Bon Jovi, Slayer, and The Ventures — representatives of a variety of musical styles. There are over 50,000 imprint dies in the D'Andrea archives.

After 85 years of producing, developing, and innovating, picks are now made from five plastics including celluloid. When Luigi’s son, Anthony, took over the business in the 1940s, it was expanded into cases and other guitar accessories. Today, his grandson Tony, operates the family business, along with his brother-in-law, Charles Lusso as general Mgr. In 2002, they expanded by purchasing the Snarling Dogs line of signature wah pedals and amp emulators, and the rights to the Snarling Dogs Brain Pick. In 2003, D'Andrea began distributing products from other manufacturers.

Today, celluloid has few uses other than guitar picks, pickguards, other guitar-related parts, ping pong balls, and accordion shells. Large commercial sources of it have left except for one in Italy. Mainland China now provides resources of the substance. It is produced from cotton cellulose (nitrocellulose) and camphor, in large vats which take months to cure. The lead time is anywhere from four to six months for production alone. It is then made into 300 lb. blocks, skived into sheets, and shipped from overseas—a time-consuming process.

== Update ==
As they celebrated their 90th year, effective July 1, 2012, D'Andrea USA was purchased by Delmar Products, a plastics company in Berlin, CT. Though Tony D'Andrea is in contact with the company and brother-in-law, Charles Lusso continues to work at the company, the D'Andrea family is, theoretically, no longer involved.
