= Rainbow Island =

Rainbow Island may refer to:

- Rainbow Island (1917 film), an American silent film starring Harold Lloyd
- Rainbow Island (1944 film), an American film directed by Ralph Murphy
- Rainbow Islands: The Story of Bubble Bobble 2, a 1987 arcade game
- Laiap, a reef island off the shore of Pohnpei also known by this name
