= Toluk =

Toluk may refer to:

- Toluk (Palau), Palauan currency
- Toluk, Kyrgyzstan, village in Kyrgyzstan
