= Oroluk =

Coordinates: 7°26′47″N 155°21′30″E

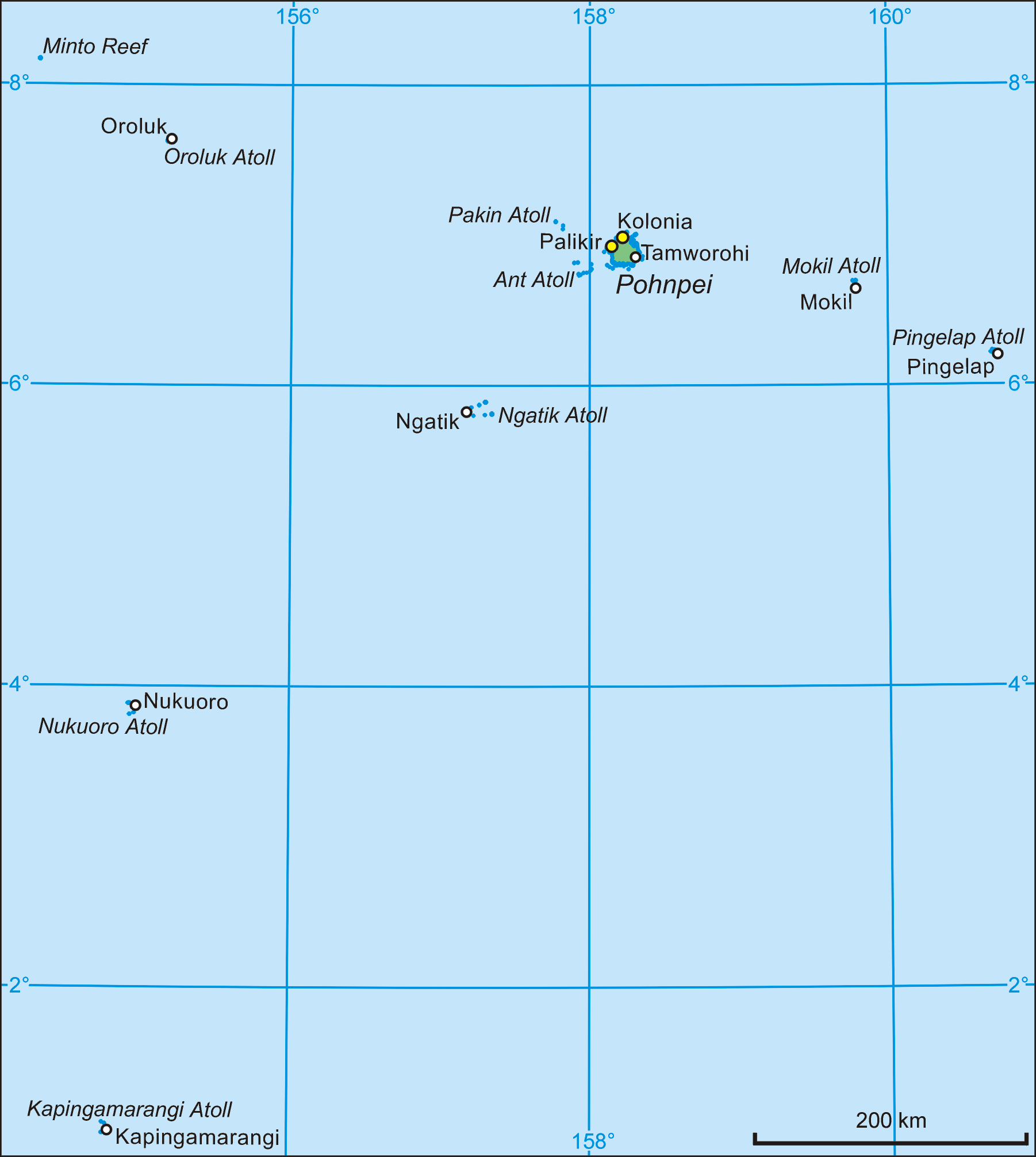
- Country: FSM

Oroluk was one of the administrative divisions of Pohnpei State, Federated States of Micronesia. In 1985, it became part of Sokehs Municipality.

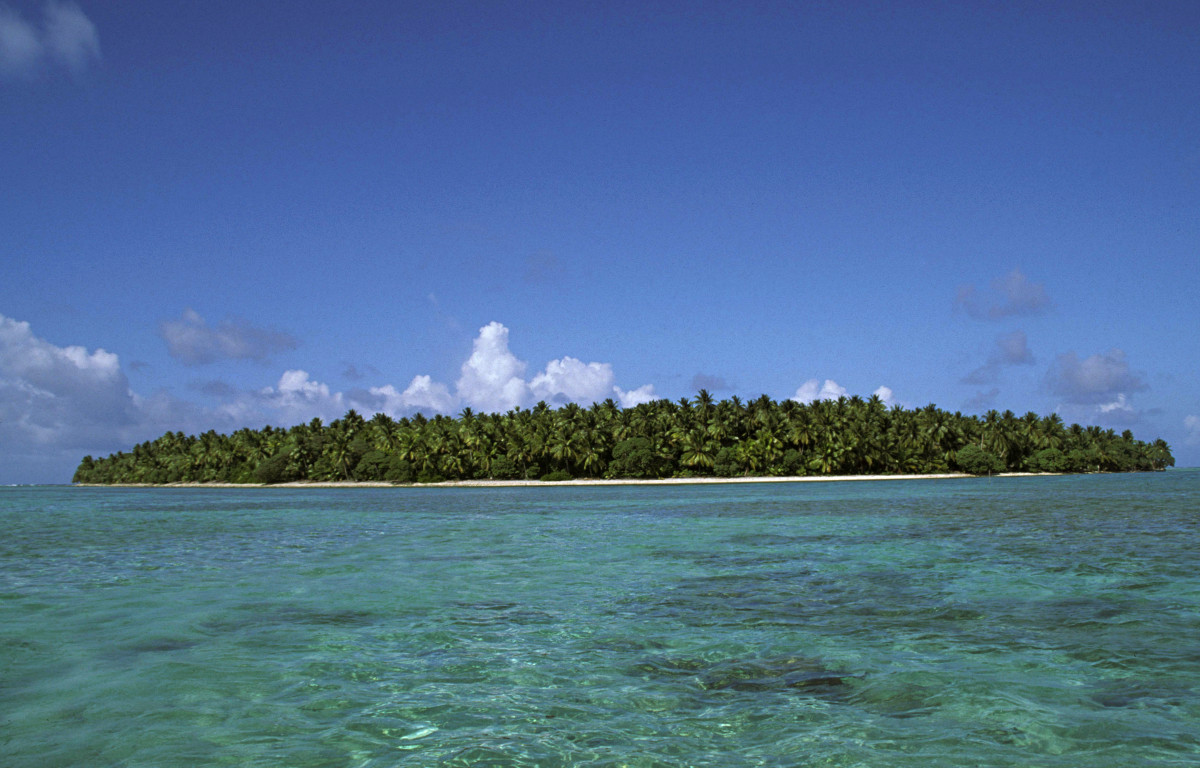
A view of Oroluk Islet, the only islet in the very large Oroluk Atoll, from the sea

== Description ==
Oroluk municipality included Oroluk Atoll and Minto Reef.

The municipality is uninhabited, after a population of 6 was recorded in the 1980 census. Minto Reef, the northwesternmost limit of Pohnpei State, is uninhabited and has only a small sandbank with no vegetated islands.

== See also ==
- Madolenihmw
- Kitti (municipality)
- U, Pohnpei
- Nett
- Kapingamarangi
- Pingelap
- Sapwuahfik
- Nukuoro
- Mokil
- Kolonia
- Sokehs
- Palikir
