= Guitar pick =

Small device used in playing guitar

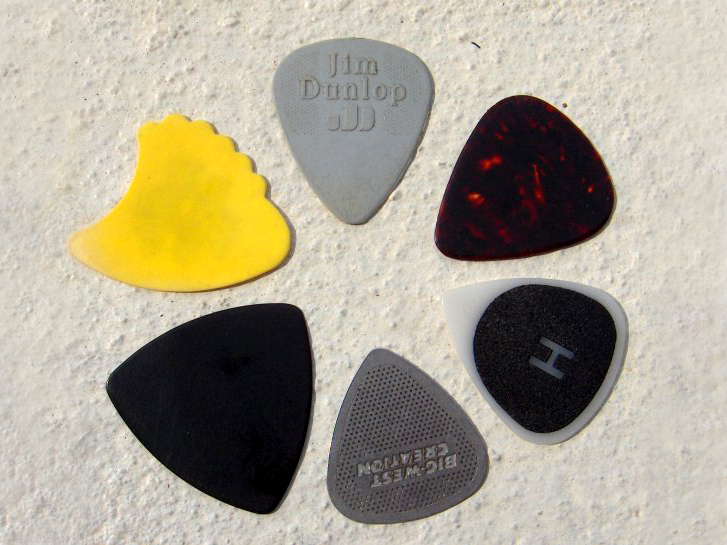
Various guitar picks. Clockwise from top: A standard nylon pick; An imitation tortoise-shell pick; A plastic pick with high friction coating (black areas); A stainless steel pick; A pick approximating a Reuleaux triangle; and a Tortex "shark's fin" pick

A guitar pick is a plectrum used for guitars. Picks are generally made of one uniform material, such as some kind of plastic (nylon, Delrin, celluloid), rubber, felt, tortoiseshell, wood, metal, glass, tagua, or stone. They are often shaped in an acute isosceles triangle with the two equal corners rounded and the third corner less rounded. They are used to strum chords or to sound individual notes on a guitar.

== Sound ==
Playing guitar with a pick produces a bright sound compared to plucking with the fingertip. Picks also offer a greater contrast in tone across different plucking locations; for example, the difference in brightness between plucking close to the bridge and close to the neck is much greater when using a pick compared to a fingertip. Conversely, the multiple playing techniques that involve the fingers, such as those found in fingerstyle guitar, slapping, classical guitar, and flamenco guitar, can also yield an extremely broad variety of tones.

== History ==
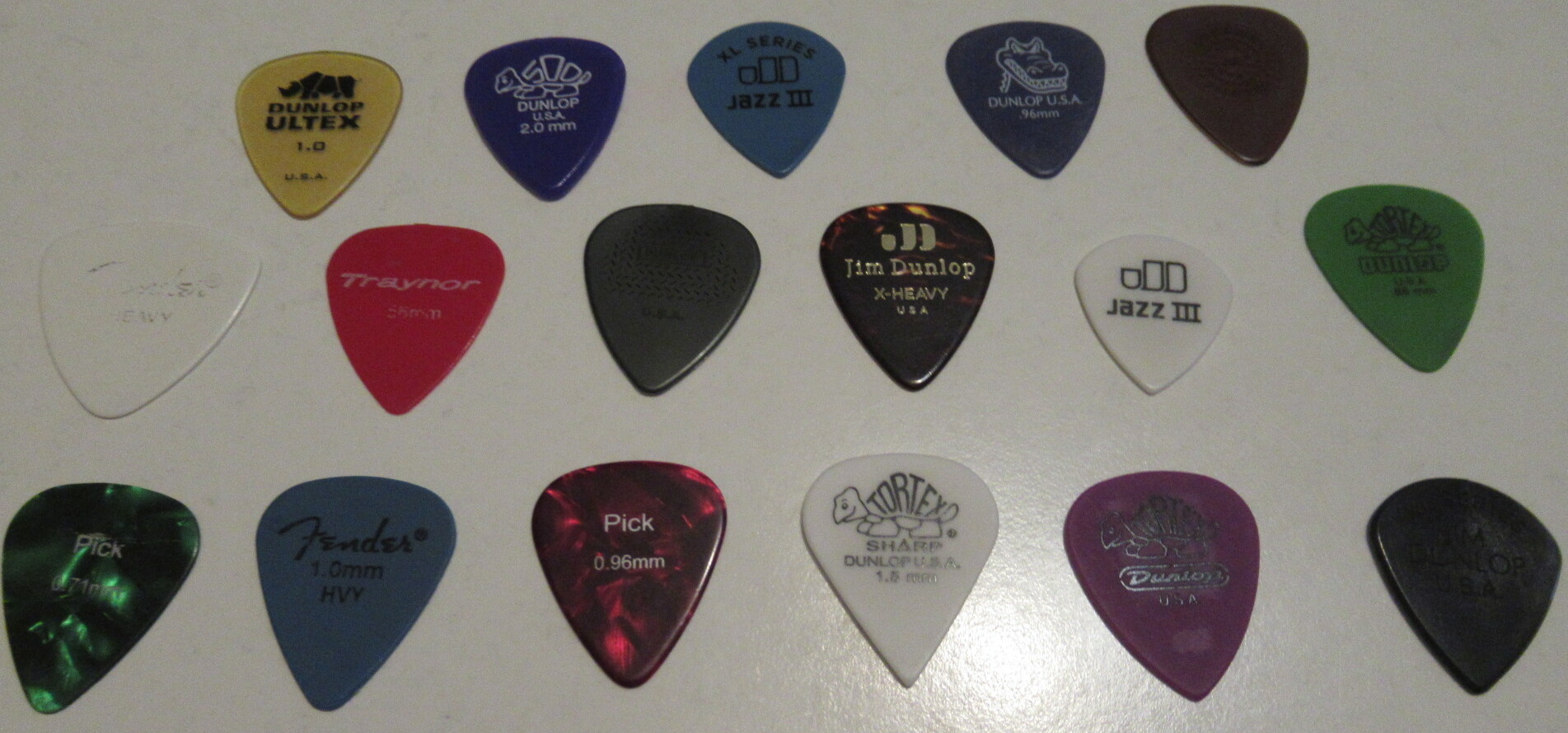
Assorted plectra for use with guitar

Musicians have used plectra to play stringed instruments for thousands of years. Feather quills were likely the first standardized plectra and became widely used until the late 19th century. At that point, the shift towards what became the superior plectrum material took place; the outer shell casing of an Atlantic hawksbill sea turtle, which would colloquially be referred to as tortoiseshell. Other alternatives had come and gone, but tortoiseshell provided the best combination of tonal sound and physical flexibility for plucking a taut string. Prior to the 1920s most guitar players used thumb and finger picks (used for the banjo or mandolin) when looking for something to play their guitar with, but with the rise of musician Nick Lucas, the use of a flat "plectrum style guitar pick" became popular.

There have been multiple innovations in the design of the guitar pick. Most of these were born out of the issue of guitar picks slipping and flying out of the hand of the player. In 1896, a Cincinnati man (Frederick Wahl) affixed two rubber disks to either side of a mandolin pick, which made it the first popular solution to the problem. Over the next two decades more innovations were made, such as corrugating the rounded surface of the pick or drilling a hole through the center to fit the pad of a player's thumb. A more notable improvement was attaching cork to the wide part of the pick, a solution first patented by Richard Carpenter and Thomas Towner of Oakland in 1917. Some of these new designs made picks undesirably expensive. Eventually, players realized that they needed something to sink their fingerprints into so the pick would not slip, such as a high relief imprinted logo. Celluloid was a material on which this could easily be done.

Celluloid provided a good alternative in multiple ways. Tortoise shell was rare, expensive, and had a tendency to break. (The practice of harvesting hawksbill turtles for their shells would become illegal in 1973 as a provision of the Convention of International Trade in Endangered Species of Wild Fauna and Flora (CITES).) Celluloid was made from cellulose, one of the most abundant raw materials in the world, and nitrocellulose combined with camphor under heat and pressure produced celluloid. Though originally meant as a replacement for ivory billiard balls, celluloid began being used for a number of things for its flexibility, durability, and relative inexpensiveness, making it a natural candidate as a material for guitar picks. One of the main reasons celluloid was so popular as guitar pick material was that it closely imitated the sound and flexibility of a tortoise shell guitar pick. Later, other materials, such as nylon (and less commonly wood, glass, or metal) would become popular for making guitar picks for their increased grip, flexibility, or tonal qualities.

Tony D'Andrea was one of the first people to use celluloid to produce and sell guitar picks. In 1902 he came upon a sidewalk sale offering some sheets of tortoise shell colored cellulose nitrate plastic and dies, and eventually he would discover that the small pieces of celluloid he punched out with the dies were ideal for picking stringed instruments. From the 1920s through the 1950s, D'Andrea Manufacturing would dominate the world's international pick market, providing to major businesses such as Gibson, Fender, and Martin. D'Andrea was the first company to create custom pick imprinting in 1938, allowing customers to order imprinting up to 12 block letters. One of the first to make the player imprint popular was guitarist Nick Lucas in the early 1930s.

== Materials ==
=== Plastics ===
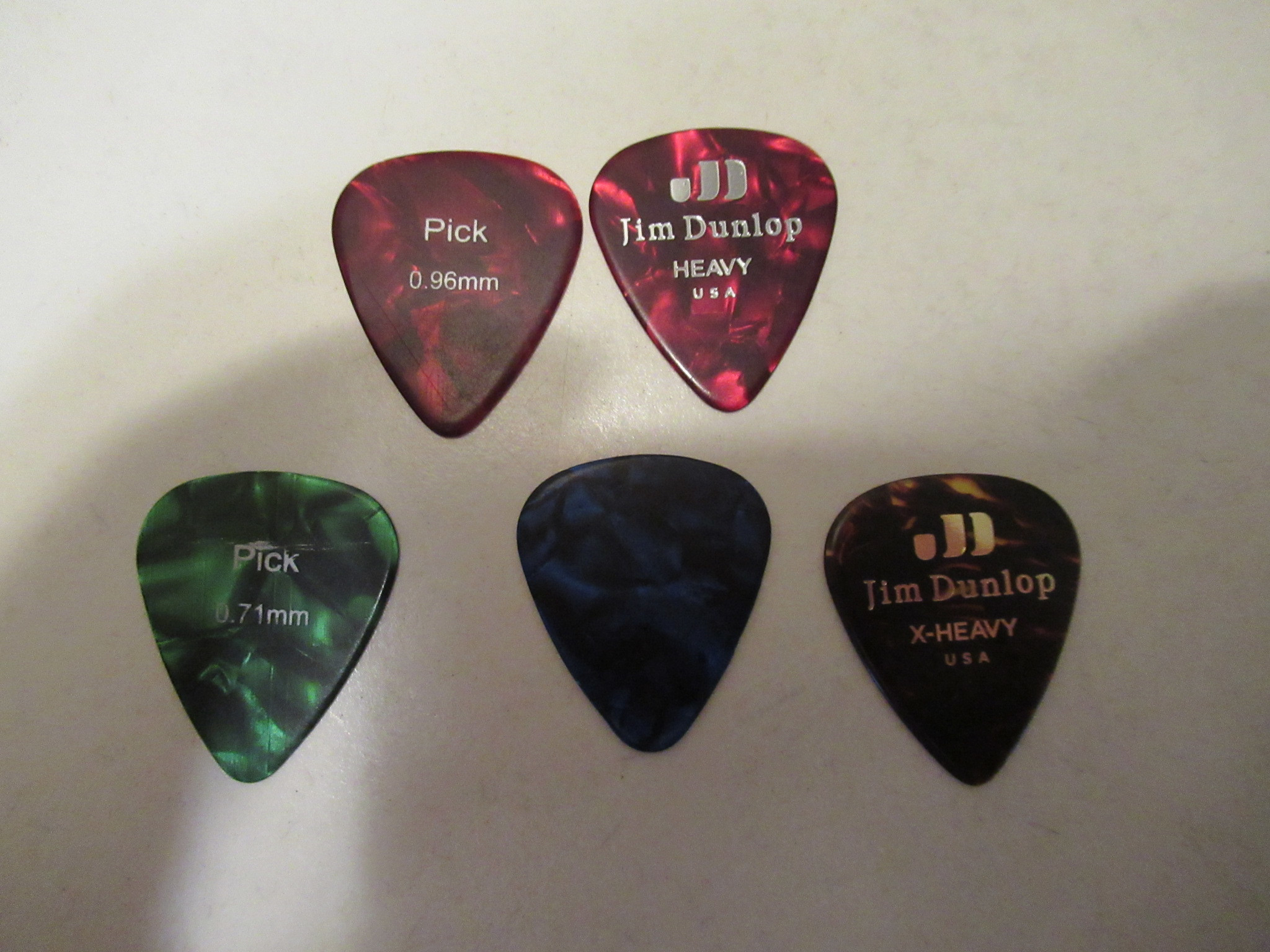
Celluloid picks

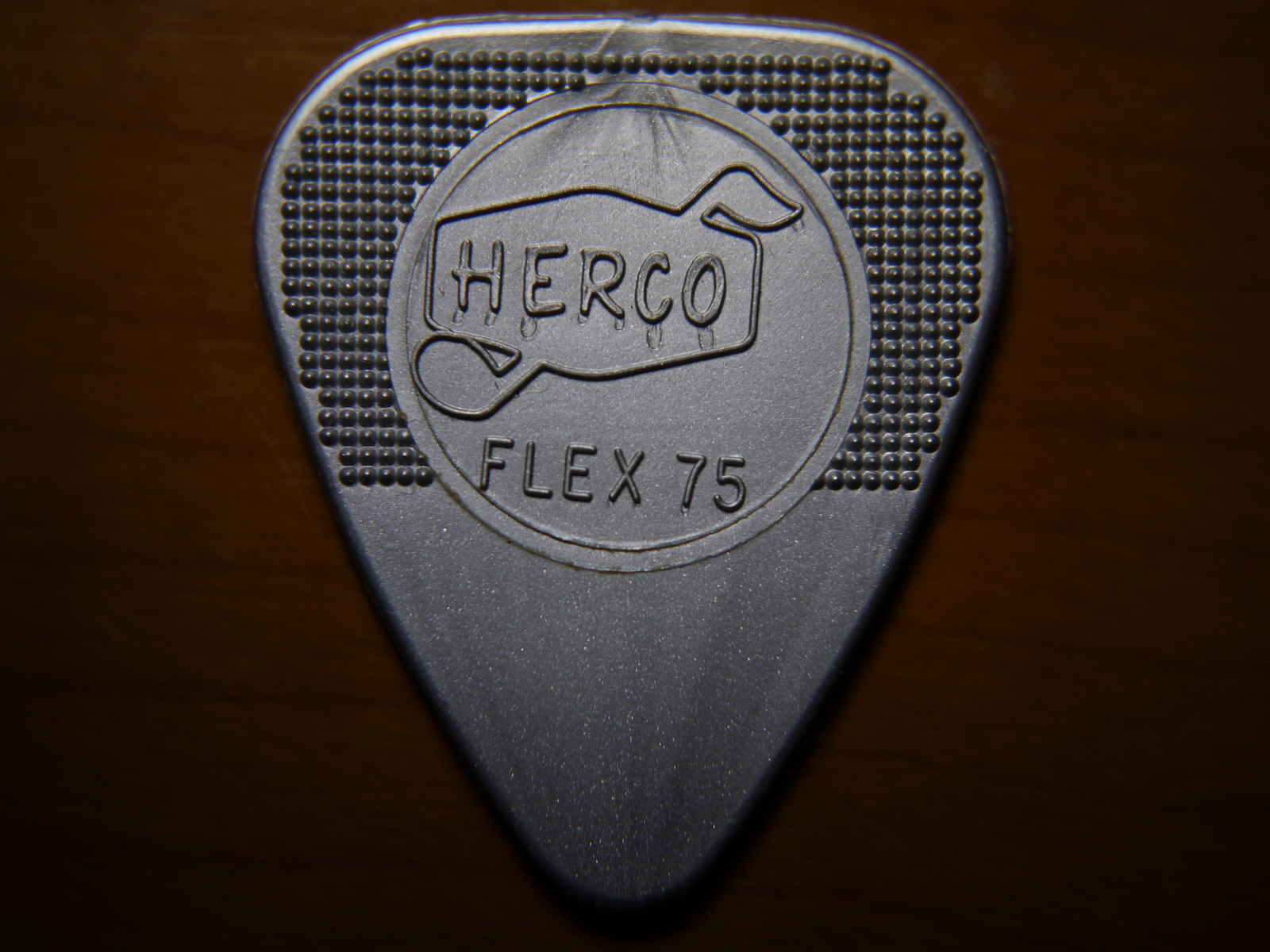
Nylon pick

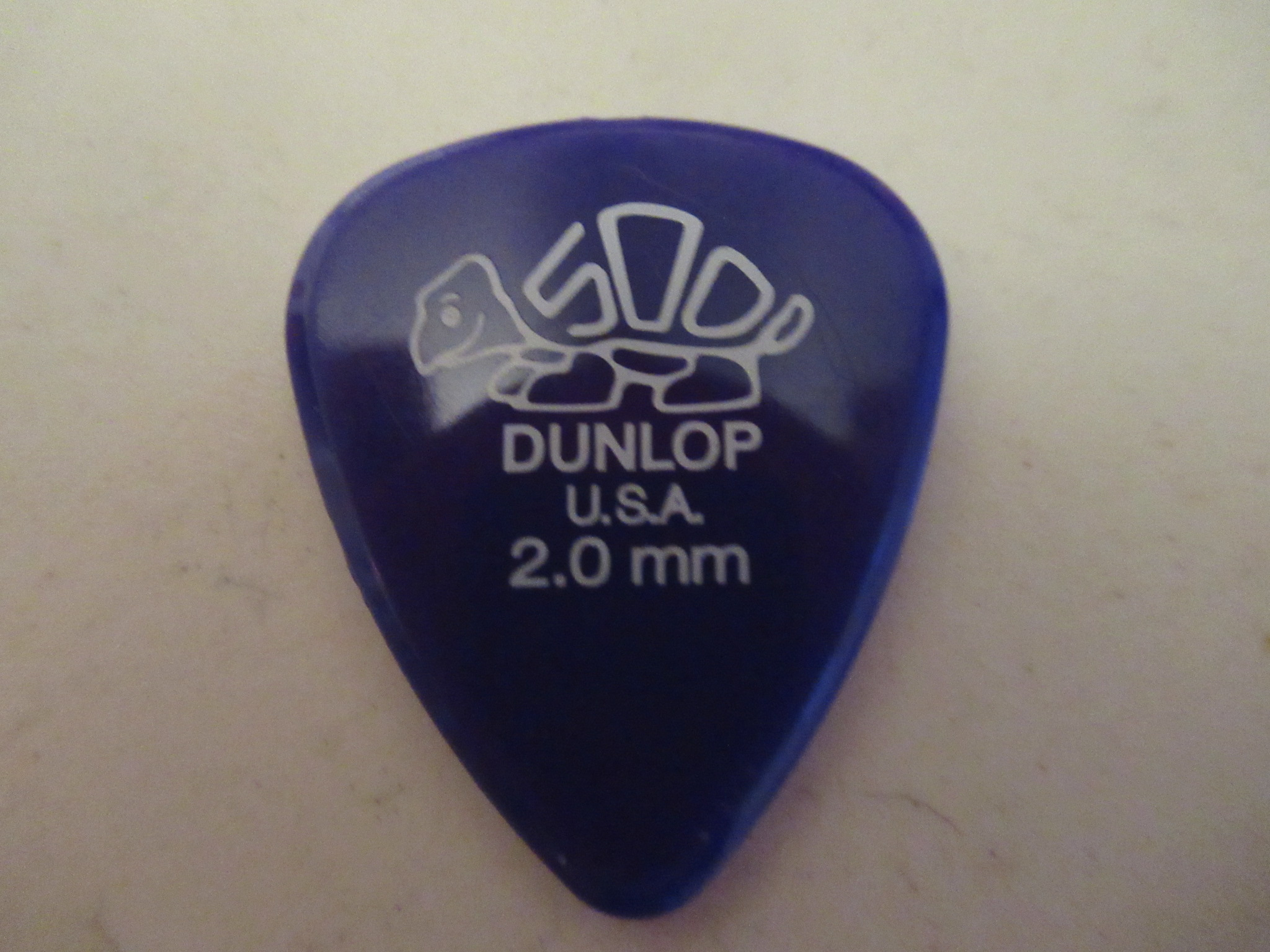
Delrin pick

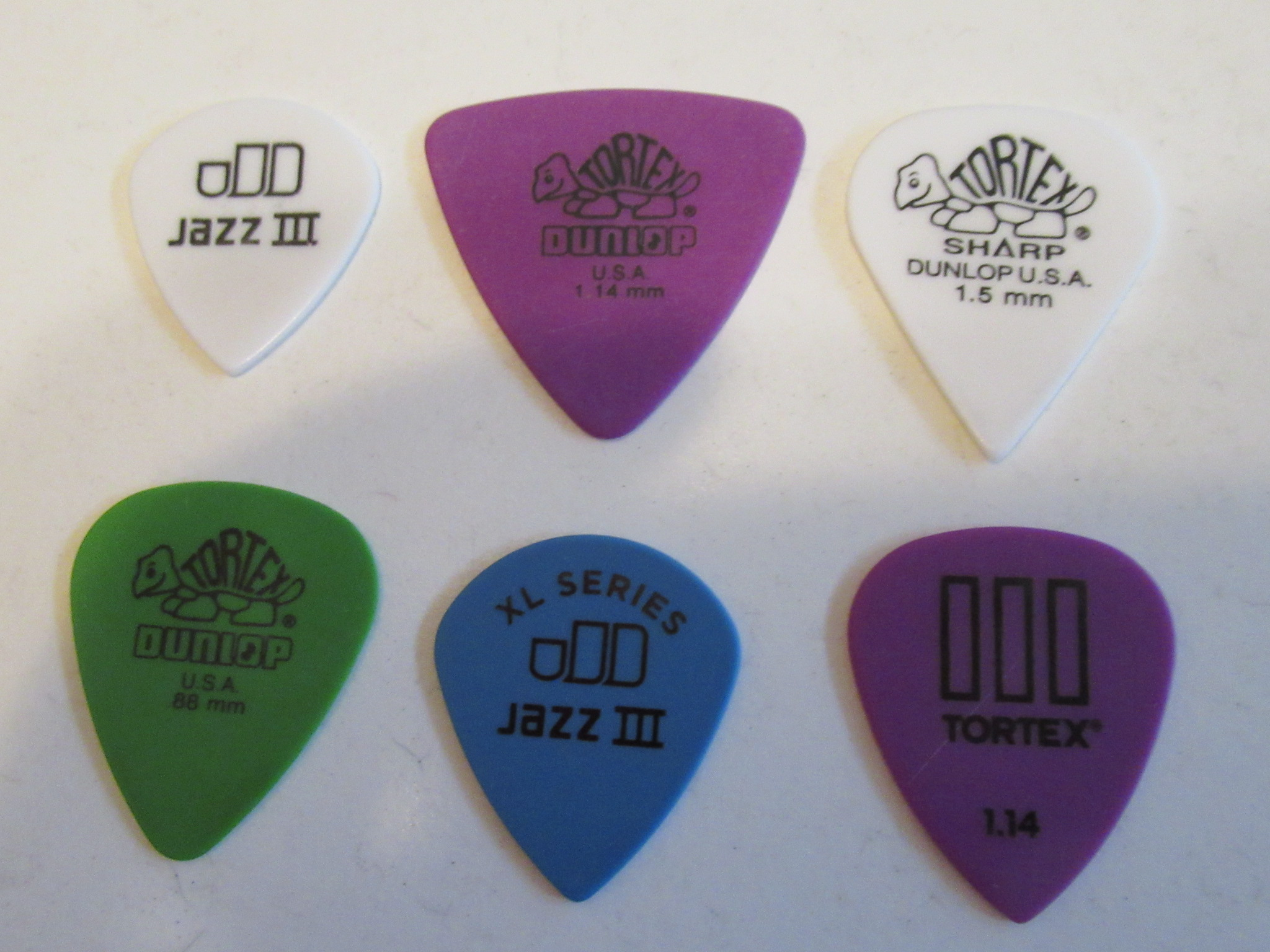
Tortex picks

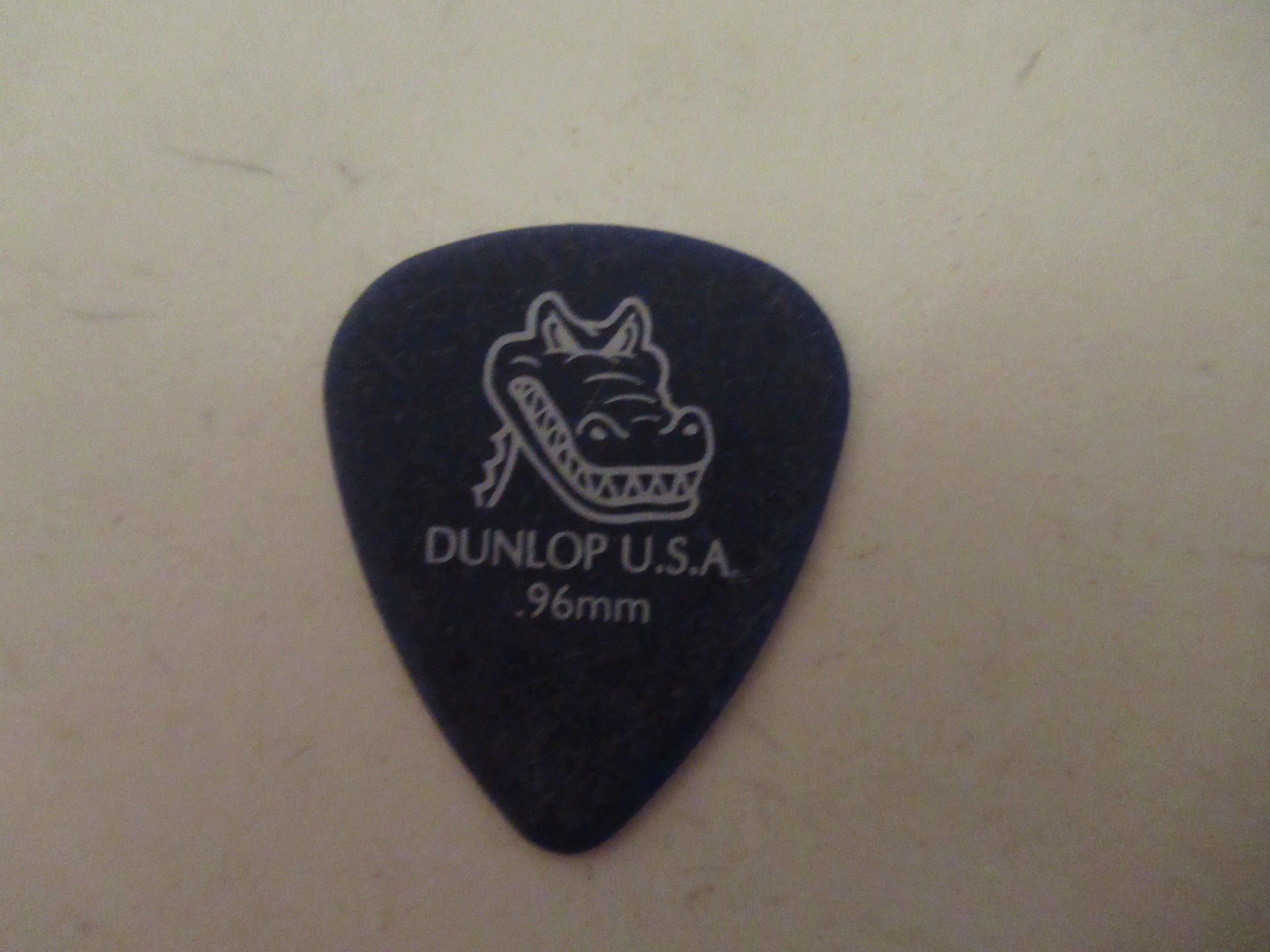
Delrex pick

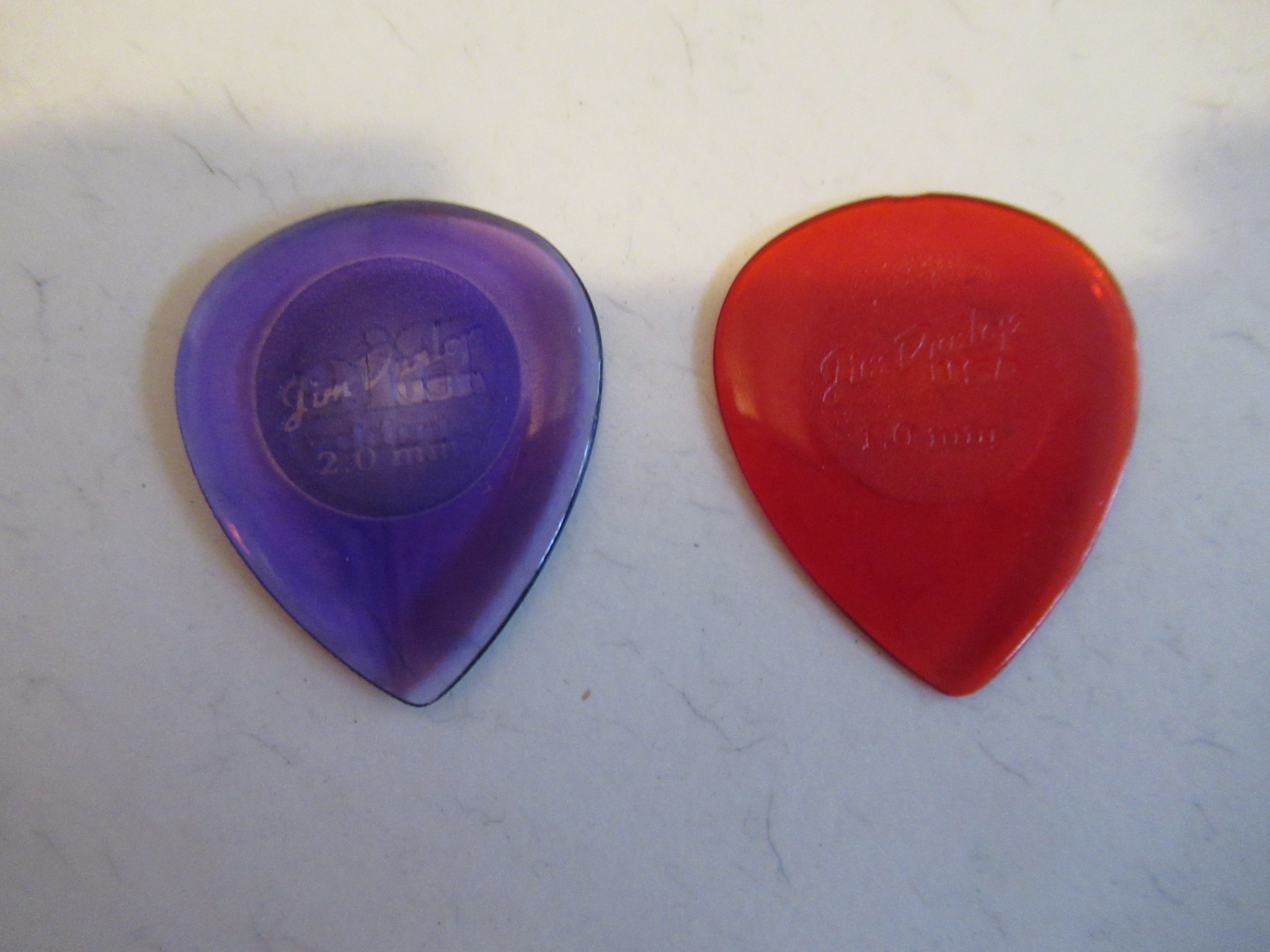
Lexan picks

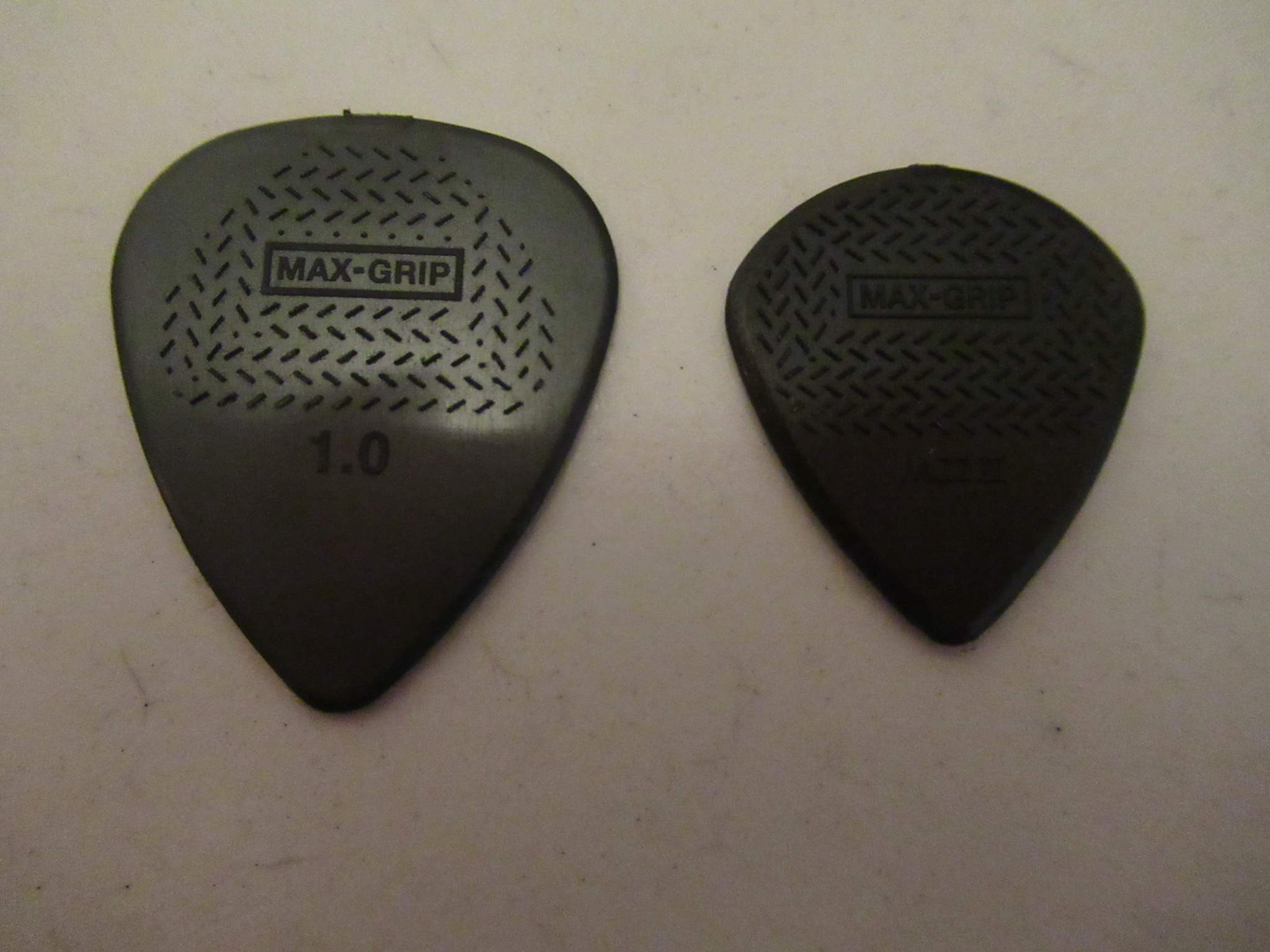
Carbon fiber picks

Most common mass-manufactured picks are made out of various types of plastic. Most popular plastics include:

- Celluloid. Historically, this was the first plastic ever used to produce picks, and it is still widely used today, especially for guitarists aiming for vintage tone. Celluloid picks often have a tortoiseshell design.
- Nylon. A popular material, it has a smooth and slick surface, so most manufacturers add a high-friction coating to nylon picks to make them easier to grip. Nylon is flexible and can be produced in thin sheets. Introduced in 1961, Herco developed the first nylon guitar pick. It became the pick of choice for a number of professional guitarists of the 60's and 70's. Due to the unique composition of nylon it was described as a "radical new idea in guitar picks" by Fretts magazine. Notable users of this pick have included Ace Frehley, Joe Walsh, John Entwistle who used the Herco for the bass guitar, Jimmy Page preferred the Heavy Flex 75 variant, David Gilmour, and Tommy Bolin who favored the Herco Gold pick which he would customize by chewing on them which he said, "loosens them up and gives them a feeling somewhere between a heavy and medium thickness".
- Acetal. Acetal is a class of hard, glossy, and durable plastics sold under different trade names. They can also be doped to produce a matte texture. The friction between a steel or nickel guitar string, and smooth, glossy acetal is low. Delrin, Tortex, and Delrex are some of the trade names used for acetal plastics.
- Lexan. Glossy, glass-like, hard, but lacking durability. Used for thick and extra-thick picks (> 1 mm). Usually has a high-friction grip coating.
- Acrylic. Tough, light, clear, seamless polymer with great resistance to impact and weathering. Acrylic is not brittle and does not yellow or crack. Can be molded and cut to almost any shape and thickness. Some grades of acrylic have a unique gripping characteristic, and when warmed to the touch, become tacky or sticky feeling, causing the material to cling to the fingers. Acrylic can be heat tempered for strength and longevity. V-Picks are the first noted company to make acrylic guitar picks, dating as early as 1980, and are the only guitar pick manufacturer that heat tempers acrylic picks.
- Polyamide-imide is a material often used in aerospace applications as replacement for metallic alloys. Picks made of this material have low friction on the strings and high durability.
- Galalith picks are claimed to excel at emulating the tone received from tortoiseshell. It is made from casein, and one of the earliest commercial plastics.
- Carbon fiber is also used by PickHeaven, Dunlop, Timber Tone Picks and RJL guitars to make guitar picks. These picks are extremely durable and have an extremely high stiffness-to-weight ratio. The world's thinnest guitar pick is made from carbon fiber and has a thickness of 0.2 mm.

=== Metal ===
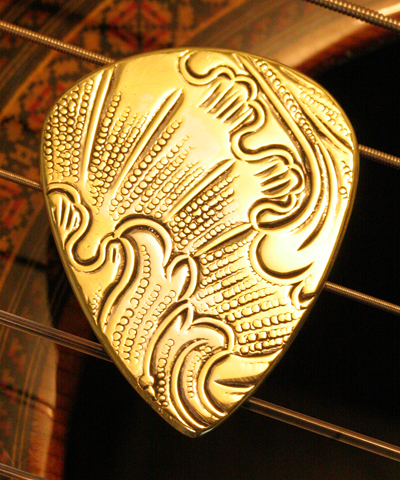
Example of a brass guitar pick handcrafted by an artisan picksmith

Picks made from various metals produce a harmonically richer sound than plastic, and change the sound of the acoustic and electric guitar. Some metal picks are even made from coins, which give players a unique tone as the alloys used in various coinage from around the world vary greatly. Playing guitar with a silver pick gives a unique, rich and bright sound, different from normal plectrums (Brian May of Queen often plays with a silver sixpence).

=== Animal products ===
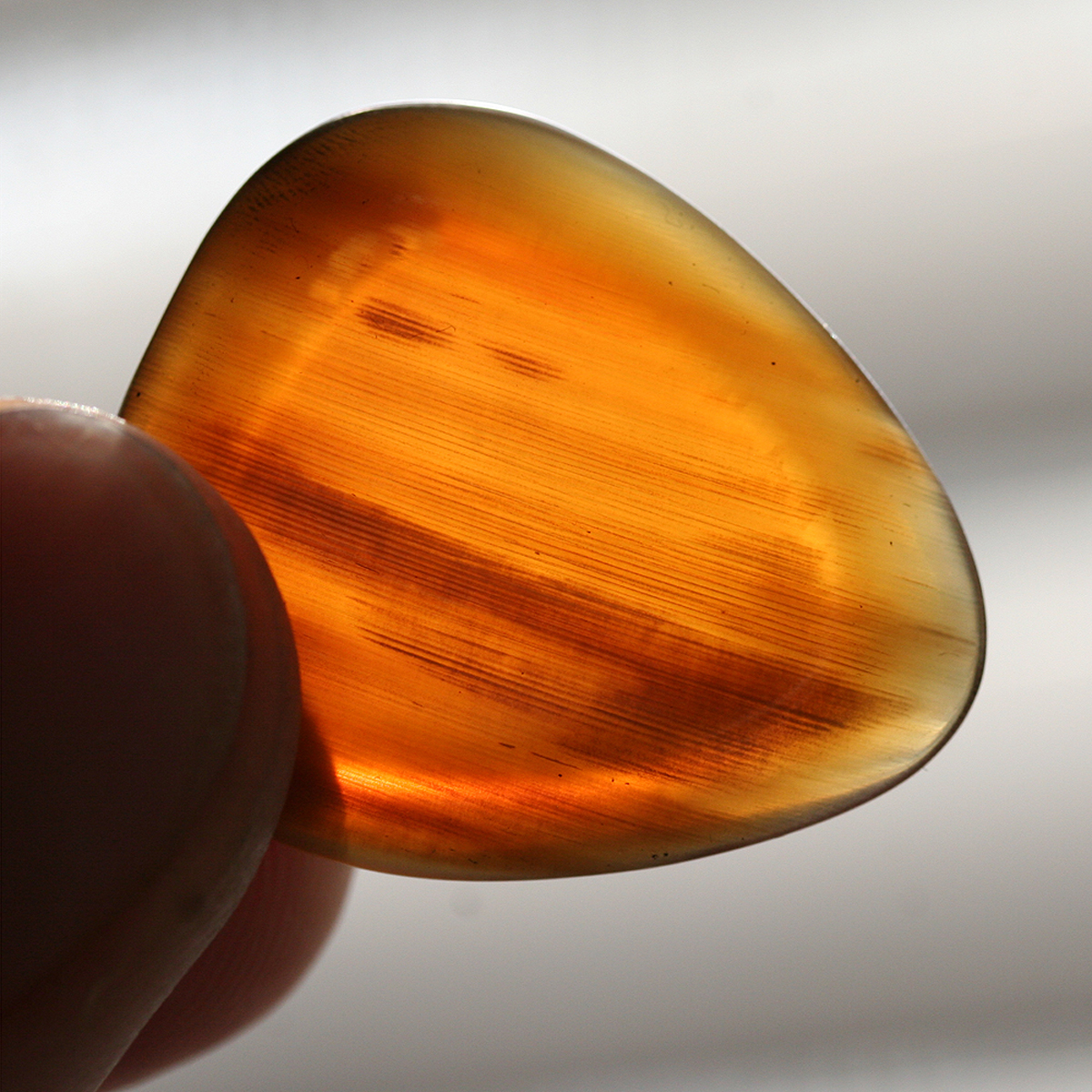
Example of an animal horn guitar pick.

Plectrums crafted from natural animal byproducts, such as horn, bone, or leather, are the oldest materials known due to their availability and durability, and are still regularly used by plectriers to craft guitar, bass, and mandolin picks. The tonality produced by each type of natural animal material varies greatly, and is further enhanced by the thickness and shaping of each material.

=== Wood ===
Each guitar pick made of wood has its own unique properties and signature sound as a result of differences in density, hardness and cellular structure. Most wood picks produce a warmer tone than plastics or metals. To withstand the rigors of picking and strumming only the hardest woods on the Janka scale are used for picks—including hardwoods like African Blackwood, Bocote, Cocobolo, Lignum vitae, Rosewood, and Zebrawood. While the thick and sometimes rough edge of a wooden pick may create a fair amount of drag at first, wooden picks are generally easy to break in and may even do so quicker than plastic picks. After a couple of hundred strokes, the metal guitar strings wear down the edge and create a smoother pass over the strings.

=== Glass ===
Glass is relatively hard and heavy in comparison to metal or plastic and therefore produces a greater range of tone than those materials. Glass can be polished to a smooth or rough texture depending on the amount of polishing. Due to the specialized tools needed to process glass, glass picks are fairly uncommon.

=== Other ===
Tagua is a nut from South America grown on a Tagua Palm Tree. The material has similar properties to animal ivory so it's also known as "vegetable ivory". Tagua produces a smooth clear tone as the material slides off the strings easily. Tagua guitar picks are generally hand made.

== Shapes ==
While picks are generally triangular in shape, there are variations intended to provide the player with alternate playing techniques.

The equilateral pick, the edges of which are all straight, can be easier for beginners to hold and use since each corner may be used as a playing edge. The shark's fin pick can be used in two ways: normally, employing the blunt end; or the small perturbations can be raked across the strings producing a much fuller chord. The sharp edged pick is used to create an easier motion of picking across the strings.

Some guitar pick shapes are patented. Usually those patents claim ornamental design.

== Thickness ==
Most pick manufacturers print the thickness in millimeters or thousandths of an inch on the pick. Some other brands use a system of letters or text designations to indicate thickness. Approximate guidelines to thickness ranges are presented in the following table:

Text description	Approximate thickness		Other possible marks
Text description	mm	inch	Other possible marks
Extra light/thin	≤ 0.44	≤ 0.017	"Ex Lite" or "Extra Light"
Light/thin	0.45–0.69	0.018–0.027	"T" or "Thin" / "L" or "Light"
Medium	0.70–0.84	0.028–0.033	"M" or "Medium"
Heavy/thick	0.85–1.49	0.035–0.059	"H" or "Heavy"
Extra heavy/thick	≥ 1.50	≥ 0.060	"XH" or "Extra Heavy"

== Technique ==
Picks are usually gripped with two fingers—thumb and index—and are played with the pointed end facing the strings. However, it is a matter of personal preference and some notable musicians use different grips. For example, Eddie Van Halen held the pick between his thumb and middle finger (leaving his first finger free for his tapping technique); James Hetfield, Jeff Hanneman and Steve Morse hold a pick using 3 fingers—thumb, middle and index; Pat Metheny and The Edge also hold their picks with three fingers but play using the rounded side of the plectrum rather than the pointed end. George Lynch also uses the rounded side of the pick. Stevie Ray Vaughan also played with the rounded edge of the pick, citing the fact that the edge allowed more string attack than the tip. His manic, aggressive picking style would wear through pickguards in short order, and wore a groove in his Fender Stratocaster, Number One, over his years of playing. Noted '80s session guitarist David Persons is known for using old credit cards, cut to the correct size and thickness and using them without a tip.
