= Britannia (1783 ship) =

History

Great Britain
- Name: Britannia
- Owner: John St Barbe & Co.
- Builder: Sunderland
- Launched: 1783
- Fate: No longer listed 1845

General characteristics
- Tons burthen: 296, 320 from 1800, or 315 (bm)
- Propulsion: Sails
- Sail plan: Brig
- Complement: 27
- Armament: 1793:8 × 3-pounder guns; 1800:2 × 6-pounder + 12 × 3-pounder guns; 1810:2 × 6-pounder + 4 × 4-pounder + 2 × 3-pounder guns; 1815: 6 guns

Britannia was a ship launched at Sunderland in 1783. In 1791 she received a three-year license from the British East India Company to engage in whaling in the South Pacific and off New South Wales. Britannia engaged in a small amount of sealing and whaling during her absence from Britain. She was also employed shuttling between Port Jackson and other ports bringing supplies to the new colonists. Shortly after her return to Britain in 1797 she temporarily disappeared from Lloyd's Register. From 1800 to 1822 she was a Greenland whaler, and then from 1822 to 1837 she was a Southern Whale fishery whaler. Between 1840 and 1844 she was a London-based collier. After a 61-year career, she was no longer listed in 1845.

== Career ==
=== New South Wales ===
Britannia, under the command of William Raven, left Britain on 15 February 1792, bound for the New South Wales fishery. (Note: Raven had been an officer in the Royal Navy with the rank of lieutenant.) She arrived at Port Jackson on 25 July 1792 from England, with stores. She sailed on 30 September but returned to Sydney Cove on 3 October to fit for a voyage to the Cape of Good Hope. The officers of the New South Wales Corps had hired her for £2000 to sail there and purchase cattle and stores not available in Australia. Eleven shareholders subscribed £200 each to purchase the cattle and stores. Artificers went on board to create pens for the cattle. She also shipped hay to feed the stock. She then sailed on 7 October.

On the way, she left a sealing gang at Dusky Sound (on the southwest corner of New Zealand). She arrived back at Sydney with cattle from the Cape on 20 June 1793.

Raven was issued a letter of marque on 1 June 1793, clearly in absentia.

Britannia left in September 1793 for Bengal to bring back supplies for Lieutenant-Governor Francis Grose. On the way Raven retrieved the sealing gang at Dusky Sound, and then stopped at Norfolk Island. There Governor Philip Gidley King engaged Britannia to carry himself and two Maoris to New Zealand.

Britannia finally left for Bengal. On his way Raven passed the Loyalty Islands and became the first European on record to sight Maré Island. He also mapped the location of Lifou, Tiga and Ouvéa. He also provided a firm sighting for Ngatik in the Federated States of Micronesia. (Note: The source for this information states that Britannia was a British East India Company vessel, which she was not.)

However, bad weather delayed Raven, as did pirates in the Malacca Straits that attacked Britannia but were driven off. Raven decided to buy his provisions at Batavia instead. He arrived there on 11 February 1794. Britannia, Raven, master, was reported "well" at Batavia on 16 February 1794. There Raven purchased 111,000 pounds of beef, 84,000 lbs of pork, as well as sugar and rice. He charged the Australian government £7549 4s 3d for the purchases, and £2210 7s 7d for the charter of Britannia. He left Batavia on 10 April. By the time he had returned to Sydney in June, storeships had arrived with supplies from Britain. Still, the officers of the New South Wales Corps again chartered Britannia to bring back supplies from the Cape.

Britannia arrived with cattle from the Cape on 4 March 1795. In June the acting governor, William Paterson, chartered Britannia to acquire provisions from Bengal. Britannia supposedly departed on 22 December 1795, however she was already reported "well" at Calcutta in December. She was expected to sail for New South Wales around 10 January 1796. She returned on 11 May 1796 with the provisions. She finally left for England on 27 September 1796. Britannia arrived back in Britain in June 1797. Her owner, St Barbe, then sold her and she disappears from Lloyd's Register after 1798. In December 1797 Raven was appointed master of HMS Buffalo to sail her from England to New South Wales.

The table below is from Lloyd's List. Britannia enters the Register in 1790, and is last listed in 1799. The data in the Register was only as accurate as owners chose to keep it updated. Clearly, St. Barbe & Co. was lax. However, St. Barbe owned whalers and one may infer that the "Straits" in the table is Davis Strait, by Newfoundland.

Year	Master	Owner	Trade
1790	W. "Warng"; D. Young	St. Barbe & Co.	London-Straits
1791	D. Young	St. Barbe	London-Antigua
1792	W. Raven	St. Barbe & Co.	London-Antigua
1793	W. Raven	St. Barbe & Co.	London-Straits
1794	W. Raven	St. Barbe & Co.	London-Straits
1795	W. Raven	St. Barbe & Co.	London-Straits
1796	W. Raven	St. Barbe & Co.	London-Straits
1797	W. Raven	St. Barbe & Co.	London-Straits
1798		T. Hall	London

=== Greenland whaler ===
Britannia returned to Lloyd's Register in 1800, still under Hall's ownership. She had been "doubled" in 1798, a process that extended her useful life and strengthened her for sailing in northern waters, and her burthen increased to 320 tons. Her trade was now London-Greenland.

Year	Master	Owner	Trade
1800	R. Scott	T. Hall	London-Greenland
1805	Stevenson	T. Hall	London-Greenland
1810	J. Eddington	T. Hall	London-Greenland
1815	W. Jacks	T. Hall	London-Greenland
1820	W. Jacks	Lyddicker	London-Greenland
1822	W. Jacks; Luce	Lyddicker; Sturges	London-Greenland; London-South Seas

There is good data for Britannia's catch in Greenland whale fisheries between 1814 and 1821. throughout the period her master was Jacks.

Year	Where	Whales	Tuns whale oil
1814	Greenland	25	168
1815	Davis Strait	11	150
1816	Greenland	8	95
1817	Greenland	2	27 (Note: On this voyage Britannia also took 20 seals.)
1818	Greenland	10	136
1819	Greenland	7	85
1820	Greenland	12	157
1821	Greenland	5	83

=== Sturge & Co. ===
Between 1822 and 1837 Britannia made five whaling voyages for Sturge & Co. Thomas Sturge was a Quaker and owner of some 22 vessels, many of them South Seas-whalers. He purchased Britannia in 1822 and kept her until 1844, though for the last four years she served as a collier.

Voyage #1: Britannia, Luce, master, left Britain in 1822. She stopped in at Rio de Janeiro on her way to the South Seas fishery, and was reported to have 50 barrels of whale oil by December 1822. She returned on 20 July 1823 with 80 casks, plus fins (baleen).

Voyage #2: Captain Lawton (or Laughton) left Britain on 20 January 1824. Britannia was reported to have 260 barrels in July 1824. She was at Honolulu on 22 September 1825 with 800 barrels, but with her crew afflicted by scurvy. She returned to Honolulu on 24 October to attempt to retrieve some deserters. Britannia returned to Britain on 2 September 1826 with 450 casks and seven tanks of whale oil.

Voyage #3: Captain Lawton again sailed Britannia on her third whaling voyage, leaving Britain on 20 January 1827 for the Pacific Ocean. On 14 February she was at the cape Verde Islands. On 18 April 1826 she was at Oahu with 1000 barrels, and on 18 May at Honolulu with 1300 barrels. A year later, between 6 and 10 April 1829 Britannia was again at Honolulu, but now with 1900 barrels. By the end of October she was full. She returned to Britain on 7 April 1830 with 353 casks, 38 tanks, and three (seal?) skins.

Voyage #4: Britannia sailed on 23 January 1831 with Ross, master, and destination New Guinea. She was at Mahe on 8 October having sustained damage. By November 1832 she was at New Ireland with 700 barrels of sperm oil. She was reported to have been lost on the Comoro Islands with 900 barrels, but the report proved incorrect. She returned to Britain on 25 March 1834.

Voyage #5: Captain T. Luce sailed Britannia from Britain in 1834. She returned on 23 July 1837 with 50 casks of oil, plus fins.

In 1838 Britannia received a new keel and underwent some repairs. By 1840 she was in service again with B. Young, master, and trade "London collier".

== Fate ==
After a career of 47 years that took Britannia to Greenland and the South Pacific, she is no longer listed in 1845.
