= Oroluk Atoll =

Atoll of Pohnpei State, Micronesia

Coordinates: 7°26′47″N 155°21′30″E

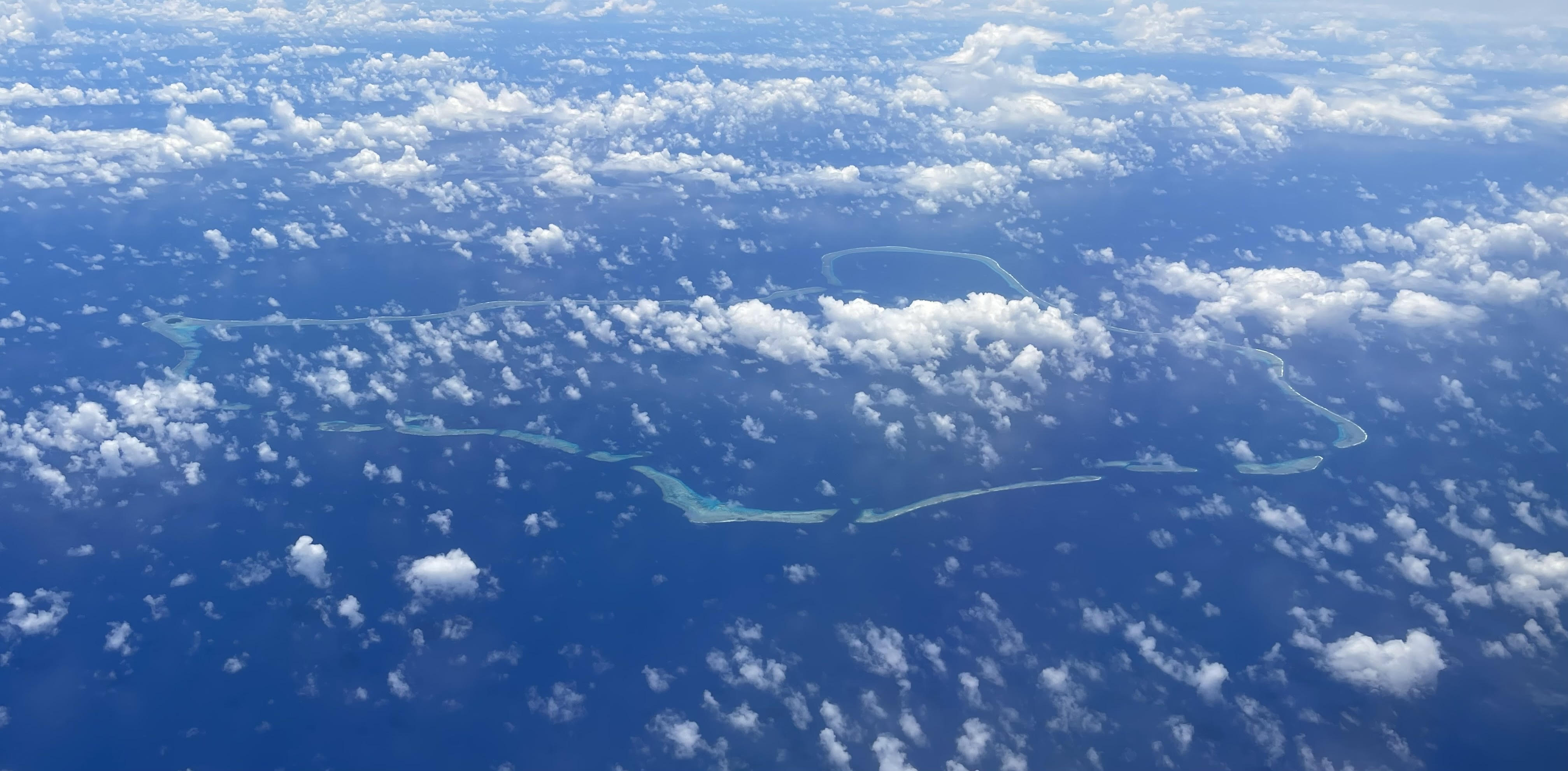
Oroluk Atoll seen from the air in 2023

Oroluk Atoll is an uninhabited atoll belonging to Pohnpei State in the Micronesia.

== Description ==
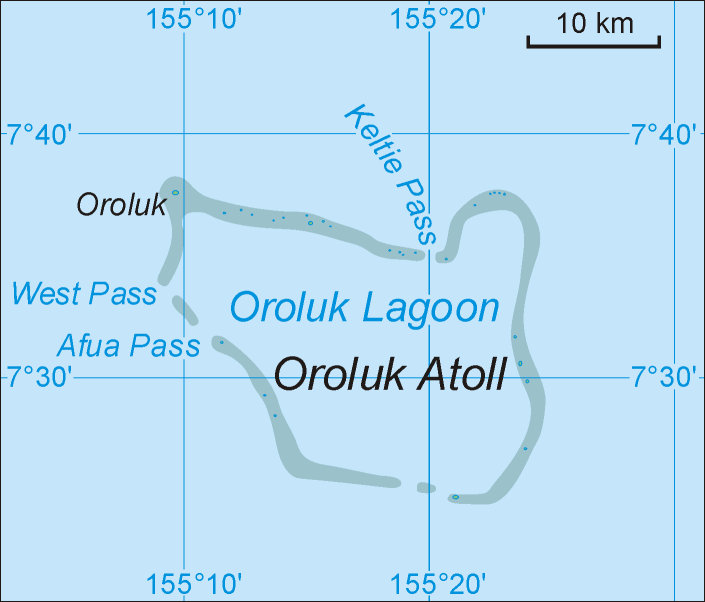
Map of Oroluk Atoll

Oroluk Atoll stretches from the northwest to the southeast with a length of about 32 km (20 mi) and an average width of 20 km (12 mi). The lagoon's surface is roughly 420 km^{2} (162 sq mi).

The more than 25 sandy islets and banks, predominantly on the eastern rim of the atoll, have been washed away by cyclones through the years. Only one island remains, Oroluk Island in the very northwest corner of the atoll. Oroluk Atoll is believed to have been first discovered and named by navigators from Namoluk Island in the Mortlock Islands.

The Atoll is uninhabited, after a population of 6 was recorded in the municipality in the 1980 census.

== Municipality ==
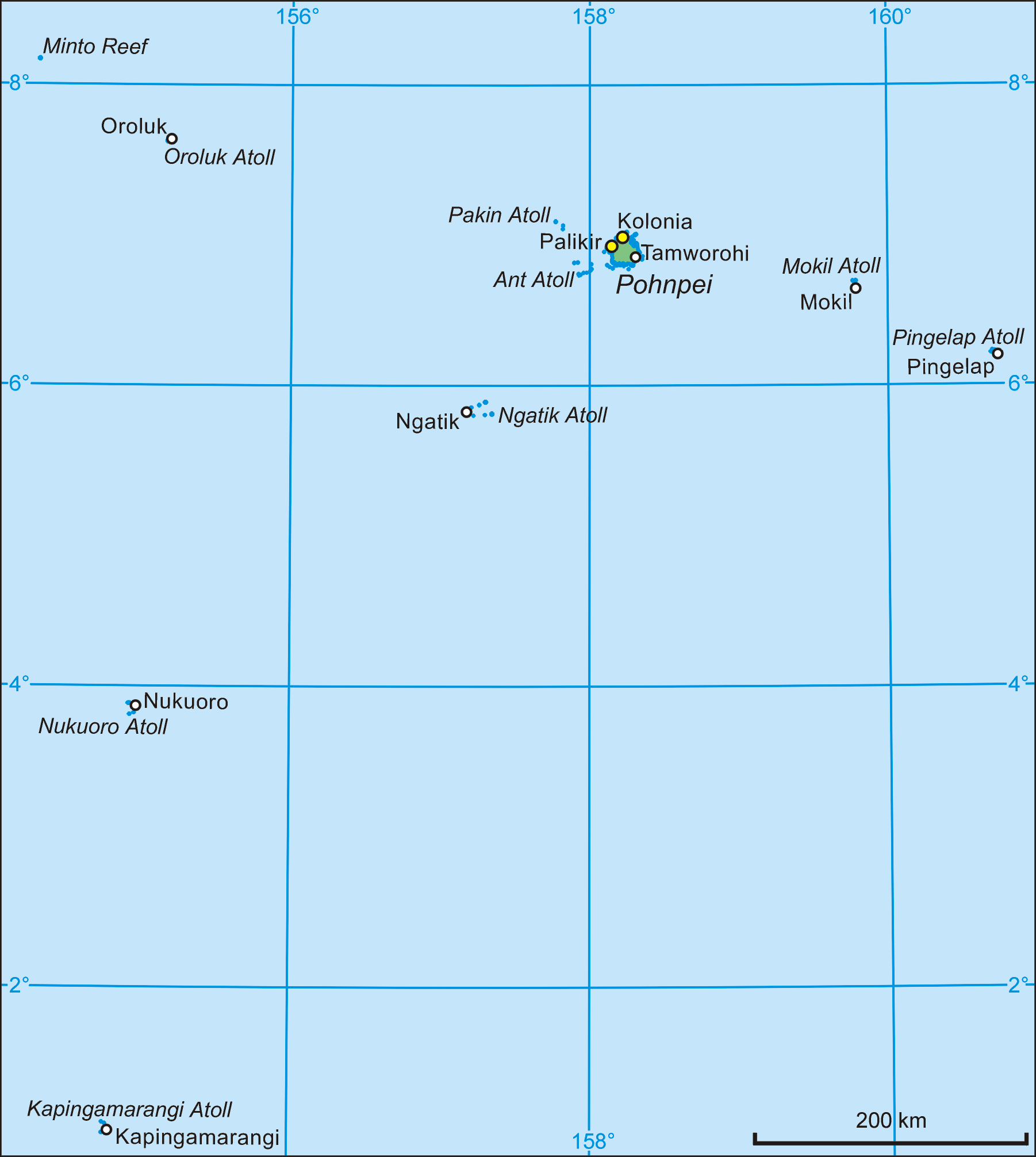
Map of Pohnpei State (with Oroluk Atoll)

Oroluk municipality, which includes Oroluk Atoll and Minto Reef, is one of the twelve municipalities of Pohnpei State.

== History ==
Oroluk atoll It was discovered by Spanish navigator Alonso de Arellano in 1565 on board of the patache San Lucas, who charted it as Mira Cómo Vas (Look how you're going in Spanish). It was also later visited by the Spanish naval officer Felipe Tompson on 7 April 1773, who charted it as the Bajo Triste (the Sad Shoal in Spanish) due to its "horrible aspect" in his own words. Oroluk Island was charted by Tompson as San Agustín.
