= Ngatikese Creole =

Ngatikese–English Creole of Micronesia

- Native to: Micronesia
- Region: Sapwuahfik (Ngatik), Pohnpei
- Native speakers: 15–30 (2014)
- Language family: Ngatikese–English Creole

Language codes
- ISO 639-3: ngm
- Glottolog: ngat1248
- ELP: Ngatik Men's Creole
- Ngatikese Creole is classified as Definitely Endangered by the UNESCO Atlas of the World's Languages in Danger.

Ngatikese Creole, also called Ngatik Men's Creole, is a creole language spoken mostly on the atoll of Sapwuahfik (formerly Ngatik) in the Caroline Islands. It is spoken by about 500 on the atoll, and by another 200 on the nearby major island of Pohnpei. It is a creole consisting of English and Sapwuahfik Pohnpeian spoken primarily by men, especially when engaged in communal activities such as fishing or boatbuilding, but is readily understood by women and children. It is used as a secret language by Ngatikese people when they are in the presence of Pohnpeian speakers.

"Ngatikese" also refers to the non-creolized language, descending from Pohnpeian, that is spoken on the atoll.

== History ==
The Ngatik Men's Creole developed as a result of the 1837 Ngatik massacre, during which the island's male population was wiped out by the crew of Australian captain C. H. Hart's ship Lambton and Pohnpeian warriors. Some of the Europeans and Pohnpeians settled and repopulated the island, taking the local women as wives. The island formed a new culture and language, a mixture of English and Ngatikese.

== Grammar ==
Pronouns and pronoun suffixes
			Independent	Subjective	Objective	Possessive
1st	sing.		mi	ai	-mi	mai
1st	dual	excl.	mehn	mehn		
1st	dual	incl.	yumih	yumih		
1st	plur.	excl.	mehn	mehn		
1st	plur.	incl.	mehn	mehn		
2nd	sing.		yu	yu	-iuk	yu
2nd	dual		ohlou	ohlou		
2nd	plur.		ohlou	ohlou		
3rd	sing.		ih	ih	-im	hi
3rd	dual.		rhe	rhe		
3rd	plur.		rhe	rhe		

== Sample text ==
The origin of Paina Island
Ngatikese Creole	Mahsmahs ket wan pohpohd me nainiki wan serhpein. Ih neim Limenarhleng. Tat ker ih-te ne-rha serhpein. Wan teh tat men i tat women tel ne-rha serhpein-o tat irha kon ko laid oh tat serhpein en ahpw kilang piht me irha kon palang-wei pahn ketpin. I rha ov en ih prokap wete. Tat serhpein ih vikiJ wat irha pwang-o, en piht kau ih wet Tat pohpwohd ih pwur, en ket mat iang ne-rha serhpein-o oh irha kaus-la. Tat serhpein erhi ko we. Ih sapal-sang N getik, ih kohkoh-da-la mn sehd oh ih vain wan ering. Ih teik tat koknet wawa-la oh vain wan lepinpik. Ih teik tat ering ih saripidi. Tat serhpein ih mimi nin. tat lepinpik-o. Tat ering ih wes. Ih tat ering tat wiahda tat deke nihm Paina.
Interlinear Gloss	Long.ago there.was a couple REL have a daughter 3S name Limenarhleng that girl 3S-only CL-3DL daughter. One day that man and that woman tell CL-3DL daughter-DEM that 3DL FlIT go fishing and that daughter too really observe pandanus REL 3DL FlIT dry-out in sun 3DL off and 3S break.up weather that girl 3S forget what 3DL say-DEM and pandanus DEM 3S wet That couple 3S return and get mad with CL-3DL daughter-DEM and 3DL banish-away that girl thus go away 3S walk-from Ngatik 3S go-up-away through lagoon and 3S find a ripe.coconut 3S take that coconut carry-away and find a sandbar 3S take that coconut 3S bury.it that girl 3S stay on that sandbar-DEM that coconut 3S sprout 3S that coconut that form that island name Paina
English	Once upon a time there was a couple who had a daughter called Limenarhleng. That girl was their only daughter. One day that man and woman (that couple) told their daughter that they were going to go fishing and that the daughter should look after the pandanus that they were drying in the sun. They went off and the weather became inclement. The daughter forgot what they told her, and the pandanus became wet. The couple returned and became angry with their daughter and banished her. So the daughter went away. She walked away from Ngatik, went on up through the lagoon and she found a ripe coconut. She took the coconut with her and (then) she discovered a sandbar. She took the ripe coconut and buried it. The girl remained on that sandbar. The ripe coconut sprouted. It was that ripe coconut which formed the island of Paina.

== See also ==
- Pidgin
- Sapwuahfik
- Pohnpeian language
- Creole language
- English-based creole languages
- Ngatikese language
- Bonin English
