= Piqué work =

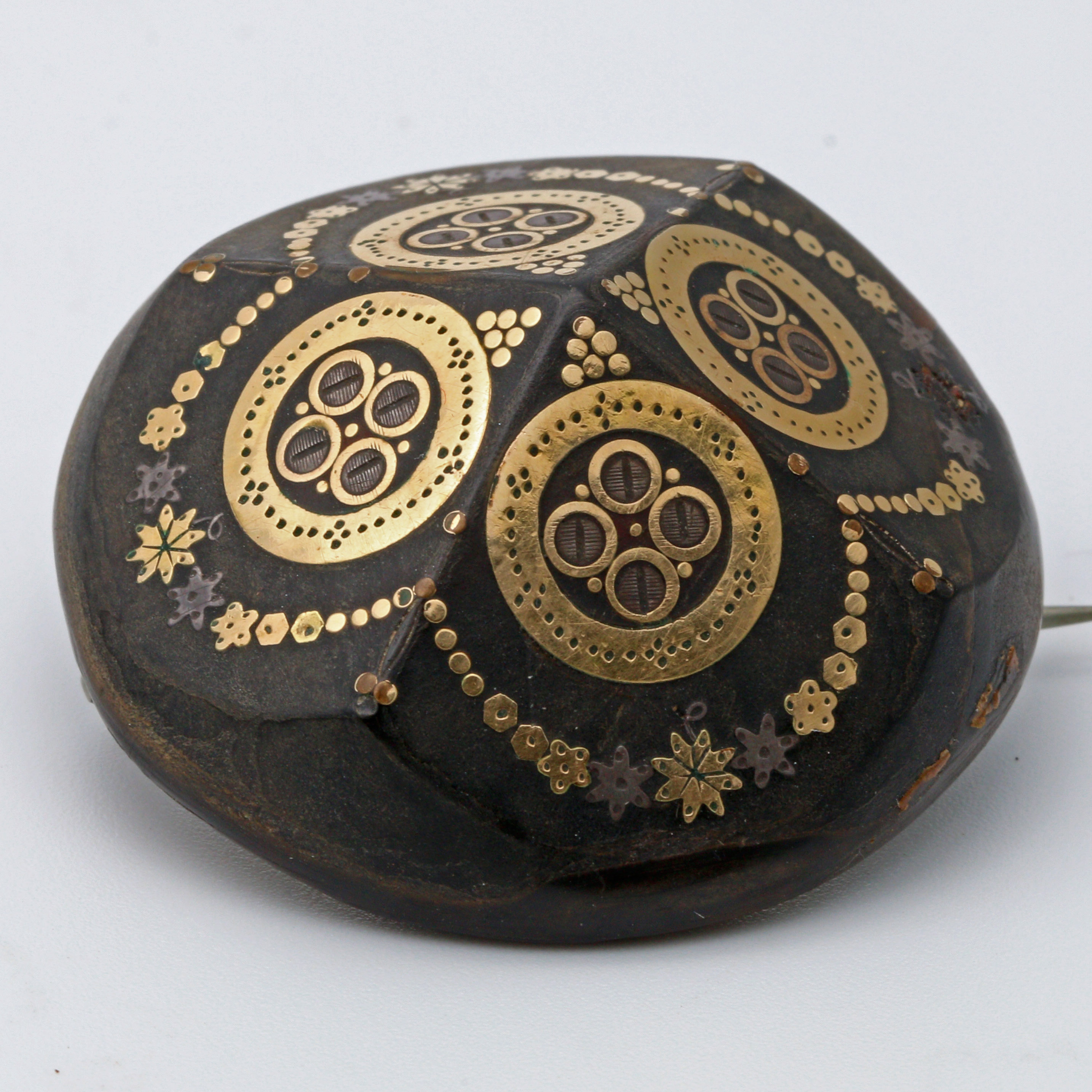
Victorian gold and silver piqué work brooch

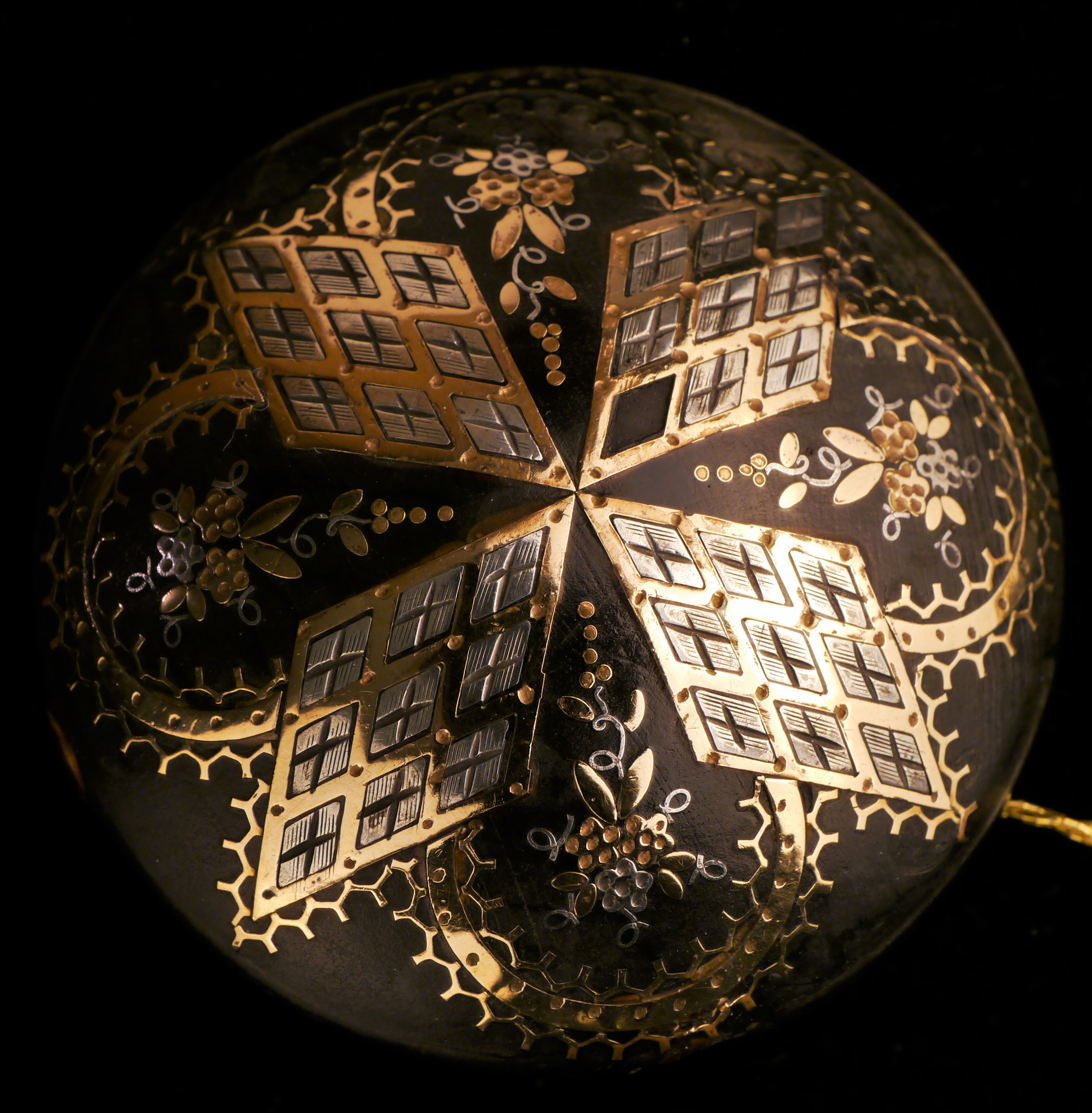
Victorian tortoiseshell piqué brooch

Piqué work was a type of decorative work made by inlaying tiny points or pins of gold or other precious metals in patterns or pictures on tortoiseshell from the now endangered Hawksbill sea turtle (Eretmochelys imbricata) or, less commonly, ivory.

The craft reached its height in the 17th and 18th century France, and was highly prized. One remarkable workshop was working in Naples around 1740 and was headed by Giuseppe Sarao. In 1770 Matthew Boulton developed methods of producing piqué work panels in factories.

== Footnotes ==
- Alexis Kugel, Piqué: Gold, Tortoiseshell and Mother-of-Pearl at the Court of Naples. Milan: Kugel/Rizzoli, 2018.
