= Minto Reef =

Atoll in Pohnpei State, Federal States of Micronesia

Coordinates: 8°10′N 154°20′E

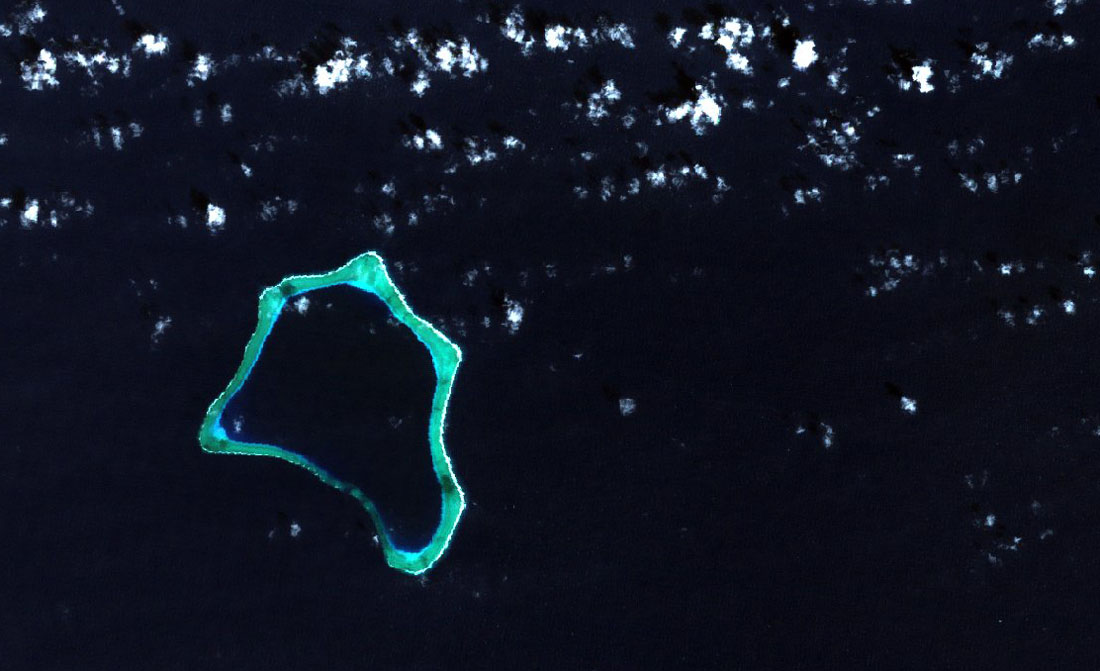
Satellite image of Minto Reef

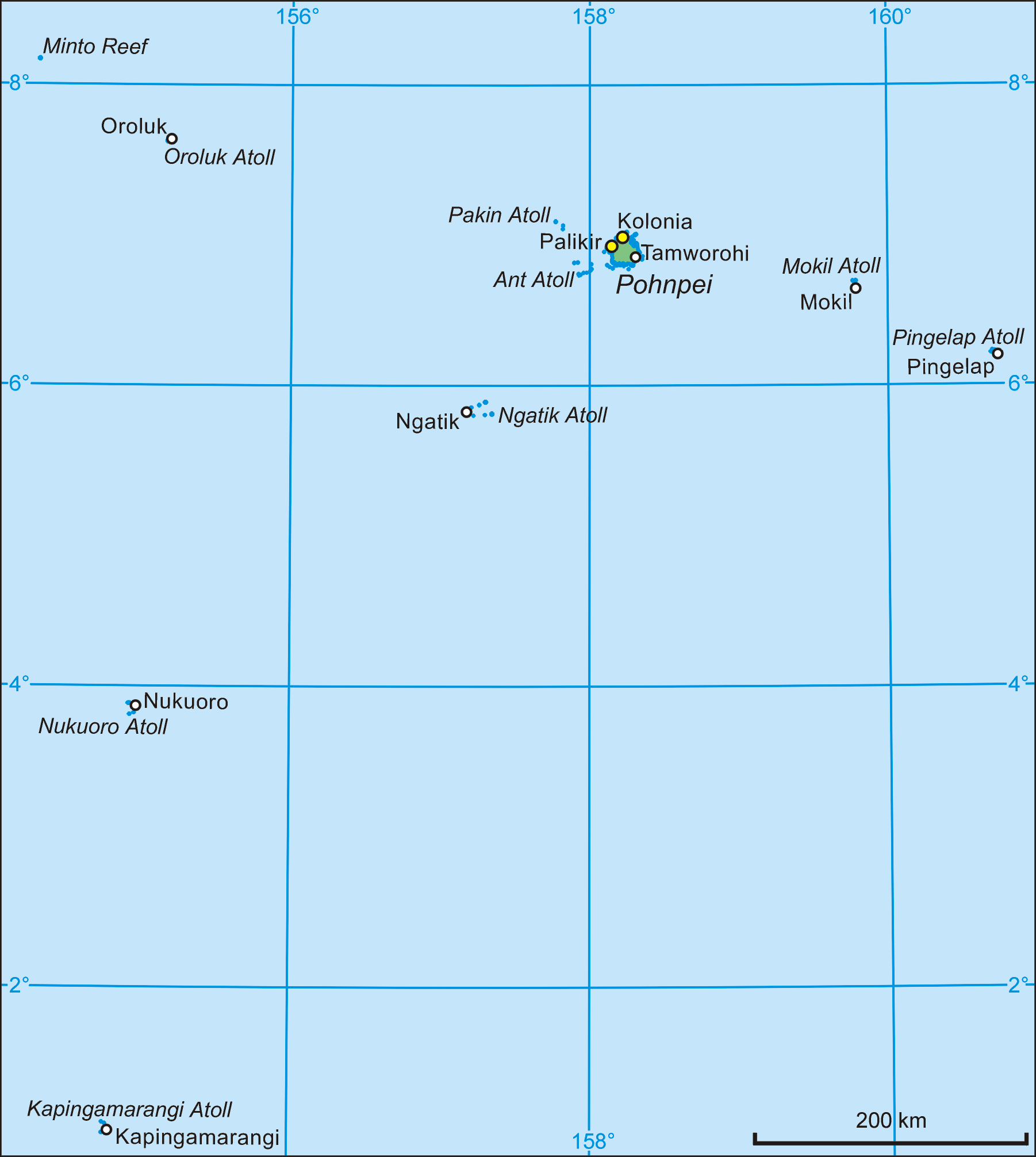
Map of Pohnpei State (with Minto Reef)

Minto Reef is a largely submerged atoll belonging to Pohnpei State in Micronesia.

== Description ==
Minto Reef encloses a lagoon of about 25 to 30 km^{2} in area. There are several boat passages into the lagoon on the southern side. It is at the same time the westernmost and northernmost feature of Pohnpei State. The nearest land is Oroluk Atoll 93 km to the southeast. Close to the northern extremity of the atoll there is a sandbank, about 1.8 meters high.

Minto Reef is the site of Minto Reef Marina Area of Biodiversity Significance, with a total area of 4,204.2 ha.

== Administration ==
Minto Reef is part of Oroluk municipality, along with Oroluk Atoll. The State of Pohnpei in 1999 created the Minto Reef Marine Sanctuary.
