= Sapwuahfik =

Atoll of the Federated States of Micronesia

- Municipality
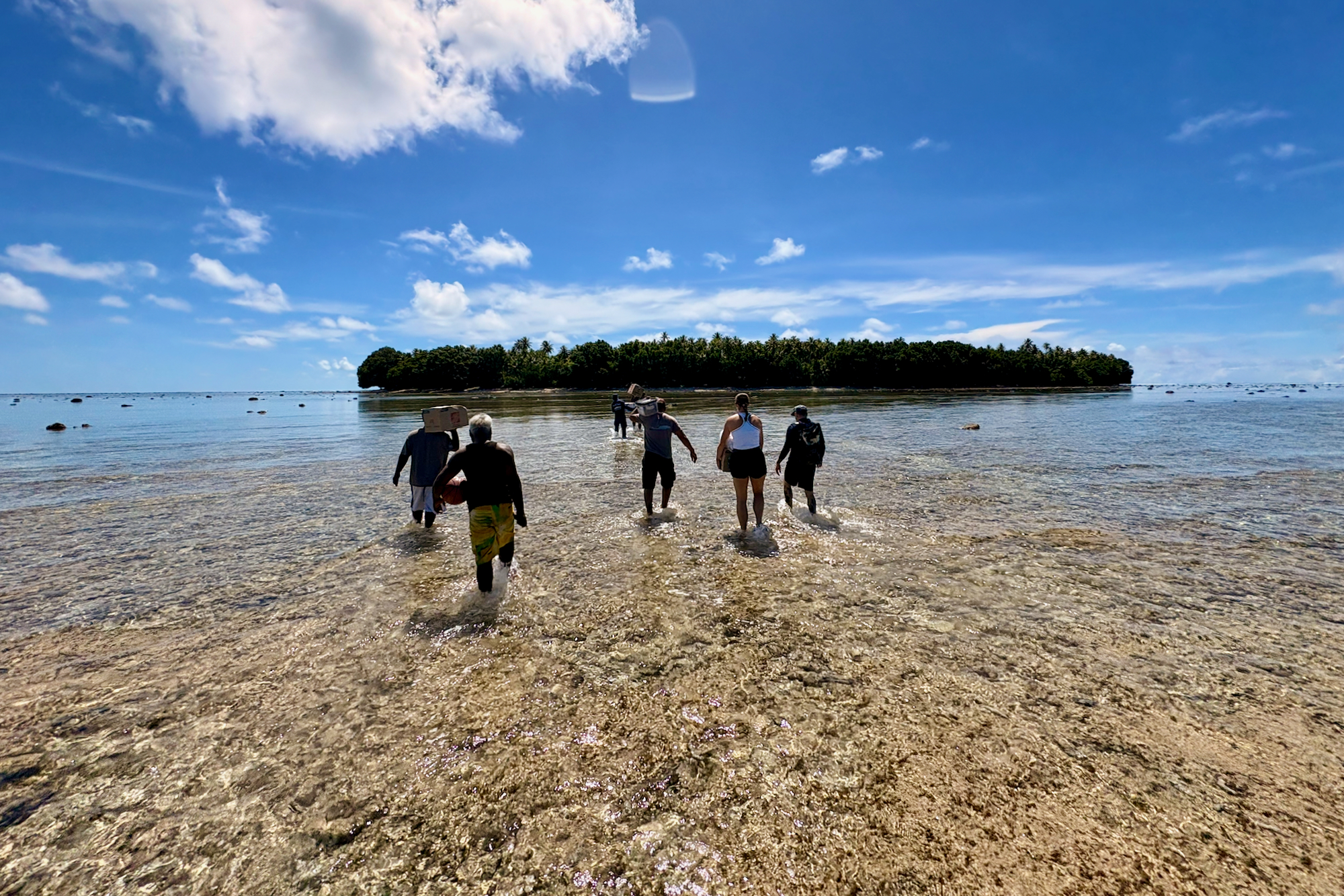
- Ngatik Island

- Flag Seal
- Interactive map of Sapwuahfik
- Country: Federated States of Micronesia
- State: Pohnpei State

Sapwuahfik
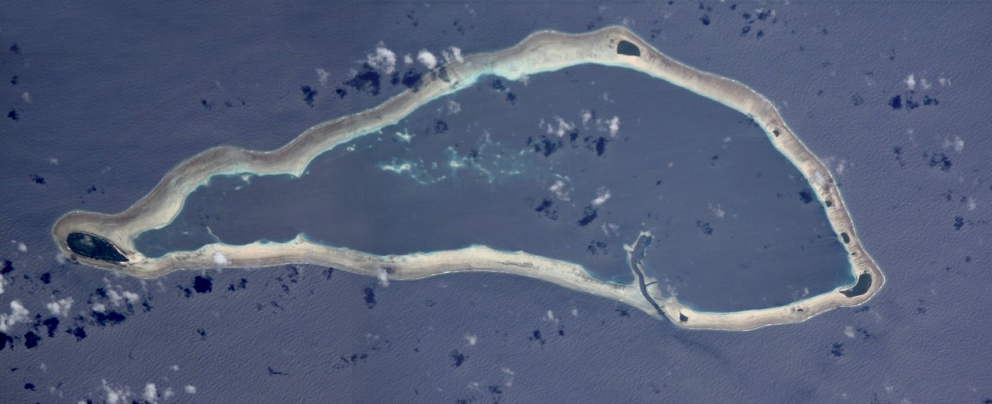
- NASA picture of Sapwuahfik Atoll

- Location within Federated States of Micronesia Location within Pacific Ocean

Geography
- Location: Pacific Ocean
- Coordinates: 5.7878°N 157.1533113°E
- Total islands: 10
- Major islands: Ngatik
- Length: 22.5 km (13.98 mi)
- Width: 9.6 km (5.97 mi)

Administration
- Federated States of Micronesia
- State: Pohnpei
- Area covered: 110 km^{2} (42 sq mi)

Demographics
- Population: 433 (2010)
- Languages: Ngatikese; Ngatik Men's Creole

Additional information
- Time zone: Pohnpei Standard Time (UTC+11:00)

Sapwuahfik, formerly Ngatik, or the Raven Islands is a 110-square-kilometer (42 sq mi) atoll in Pohnpei state of the Federated States of Micronesia. It is a village and municipality of roughly 430 people on a land area of 1.5 square kilometers (0.58 sq mi). It is mostly known in history as the site of the Ngatik massacre.

== Geography ==
It is located 150 km (93 mi) southwest of the main island of Pohnpei in the Eastern Caroline Islands and consists of 10 individual islands on the reef. The largest and only inhabited island is Ngatik, at the western end.

The atoll is 22.5 km (14.0 mi) long and up to 9.6 km (6.0 mi) wide. The lagoon measures 78.56 km^{2} (30.33 sq mi) in area, and the total area is 114 km^{2} (44 sq mi). The aggregate land area of the 10 islands is 1.75 km^{2} (0.68 sq mi), of which the main island Ngatik is 0.91 km^{2} (0.35 sq mi), or more than half. While Ngatik is the only inhabited island, the six larger of the remaining islands are used by the population for harvesting coconuts and growing taro, and animal husbandry (pigs and chickens). There are 12 buildings for temporary shelter on those islands.

The islands, clockwise, starting at Ngatik in the west:

Island	Area km^{2}	Location
Ngatik	0.906	western end
Peina	0.206	north
Bigen Karakar	0.025	northeast
Jirup	0.023	east
Bigen Kelang	0.047	east
Pikepe (Piken Mategan)	0.009	east
Dekehnman	0.009	eastern end
Wat	0.281	eastern end
Pikenmetkow	0.006	southeast
Uataluk (Wateiluk)	0.039	south
Sapwuahfik (Atoll)	1.551	fringing reef

=== Airfield ===
Sapwuahfik has an airstrip that lies just off the island of Ngatik, the Sapwuahfik Civil Airfield (5.783711°N 157.167276°E). Coastal erosion has cut the airstrip off from the island by about 20 meters, making it necessary to ferry arriving and departing passengers between it and Ngatik by boat. There are on-call personnel who go to the airfield whenever a flight is expected.

== Population ==
The population of Sapwuahfik was approximately 433 in 2010. The culture is closely related to that of Pohnpei, its closest neighbor; however it retains its own distinctive character.

The local creole, Ngatik Men's Creole, developed as a result of the 1837 Ngatik massacre, during which the island's male population was wiped out by the crew of Australian captain C. H. Hart and Pohnpeian warriors. Some of the Europeans and Pohnpeians settled and repopulated the island, taking the local women as wives. The island formed a new culture and language, a mixture of English and Ngatikese (a Pohnpeic language). In addition to the creole, which is only spoken by men, all of the residents speak Ngatikese, a Pohnpeic language closely related to the Pohnpeian language.

== History ==
The atoll was first discovered by Westerners on 6 April 1773 by the Spanish naval officer Felipe Tompson when sailing from Manila to San Blas in New Spain on board of the vessel Nuestra Señora de la Consolación also called in short Buen Fin. Tompson charted the island as Los Valientes (the island of the bold in Spanish). At some point between 1793 and 1796, William Raven, captain of Britannia gave a firm sighting to the island. (Note: The source for this information states that Britannia was a British East India Company vessel, which she was not.)

Solomon Sumner, Seventh-day Adventist Missionary, was buried on the island in 1990.

== Education ==
Pohnpei State Department of Education operates public schools:

- Sapwuafik Elementary School

== Transportation ==
Sapwuahfik Airfield
- IATA: none; ICAO: none

Summary
- Airport type: Public
- Owner: Government
- Operator: Civil Government
- Serves: Sapwuahfik
- Interactive map of Sapwuahfik Airfield

Runways
Direction	Length		Surface
Direction	ft	m	Surface
077	1,200	370	Concrete

Just east of the Sapwuahfik is an Sapwuahfik Airfield with a paved 1,200-foot (370 m) runway.

== See also ==
- Madolenihmw
- Kitti (municipality)
- U, Pohnpei
- Nett
- Kapingamarangi
- Pingelap
- Sokehs
- Nukuoro
- Mokil
- Kolonia
- Oroluk
- Palikir
