= Ngatik massacre =

1837 massacre in Micronesia

Coordinates: 5.787°N 157.157°E

The Ngatik massacre took place over two days of fighting on the atoll of Sapwuahfik in the Micronesian island chain in July 1837. Captain C. H. Hart and his crew of beachcombers of the trading cutter Lampton from Sydney, Australia, massacred as many as 50 Sapwuahfik men. Hart had hoped to raid what he believed was a large stash of tortoiseshell on the island.

== Massacre ==
In 1836, Captain C. H. Hart and his crew of beachcombers sailed to the island of Sapwuahfik on the trading cutter Lampton of Sydney, Australia, on a trading mission in search of tortoiseshell, pearl shell and sea cucumber. While on the island, Hart and his crew came across what Hart believed was a trove of valuable tortoiseshell (used for ladies' combs, boxes and mirrors). Hart tried unsuccessfully to trade for the shells with the locals, who then chased Hart and his crew off the island.

One year later, in July 1837, Hart returned to the island with an armed crew. When they arrived, Sapwuahfik warriors were waiting for him on the coast, so Hart took Lampton to another islet of the atoll overnight. The following day, Hart and his crew stormed the island along with two canoes of Pohnpeians who followed Lampton in tow. In the two days of fighting that ensued, Hart and his men massacred the majority of the men on the island. Lin Poyer estimates that all but one of the Sapwuahfikan men were killed in the massacre, while Alex Zuccarelli writes that all but 20 men were killed, for a total of 50. The surviving men fled the island by canoe. Though Hart and his men claimed they did not target the women and children, they also reported that many of the women took their own lives as well as those of their children, purely by happenstance and fear. In all likelihood, they almost certainly inflicted violence, assault, and murder upon the women and children as well, which would explain the depopulation. Hart's claims of not having targeted the women and children are difficult to reconcile with the reported number of deaths and the general depopulation of the island. In the trove of tortoiseshell that he had discovered a year earlier, Hart found only 25 pounds (11 kg) of hawksbill tortoiseshell and 100 pounds (45 kg) of relatively worthless green turtle shell.

After the massacre, some of the men from Hart's crew as well as some Pohnpeians settled and repopulated the island. These men wed with local Sapwuahfik widows and formed a new culture and language, known as Ngatik Men's Creole, a mixture of English and the Sapwuahfik dialect of Pohnpeian.

Before leaving the island, Hart installed crewmember and fellow beachcomber Patrick Gormon as Nahmnwarki, or Isipaw (paramount chief) of the island, instructing him to collect as much tortoiseshell as possible. Hart renamed the island Ngatik after the massacre, but it has since been given its original name again, Sapwuahfik.

Two years following the massacre, Hart was investigated for the incidents by Commander P. L. Blake of HMS Larne. Charges were never laid against the perpetrators.
