= Laiap =

Island in Pohnpei State, Micronesia

Coordinates: 6°46′36.88″N 158°12′25.70″E

Nickname: Rainbow Island
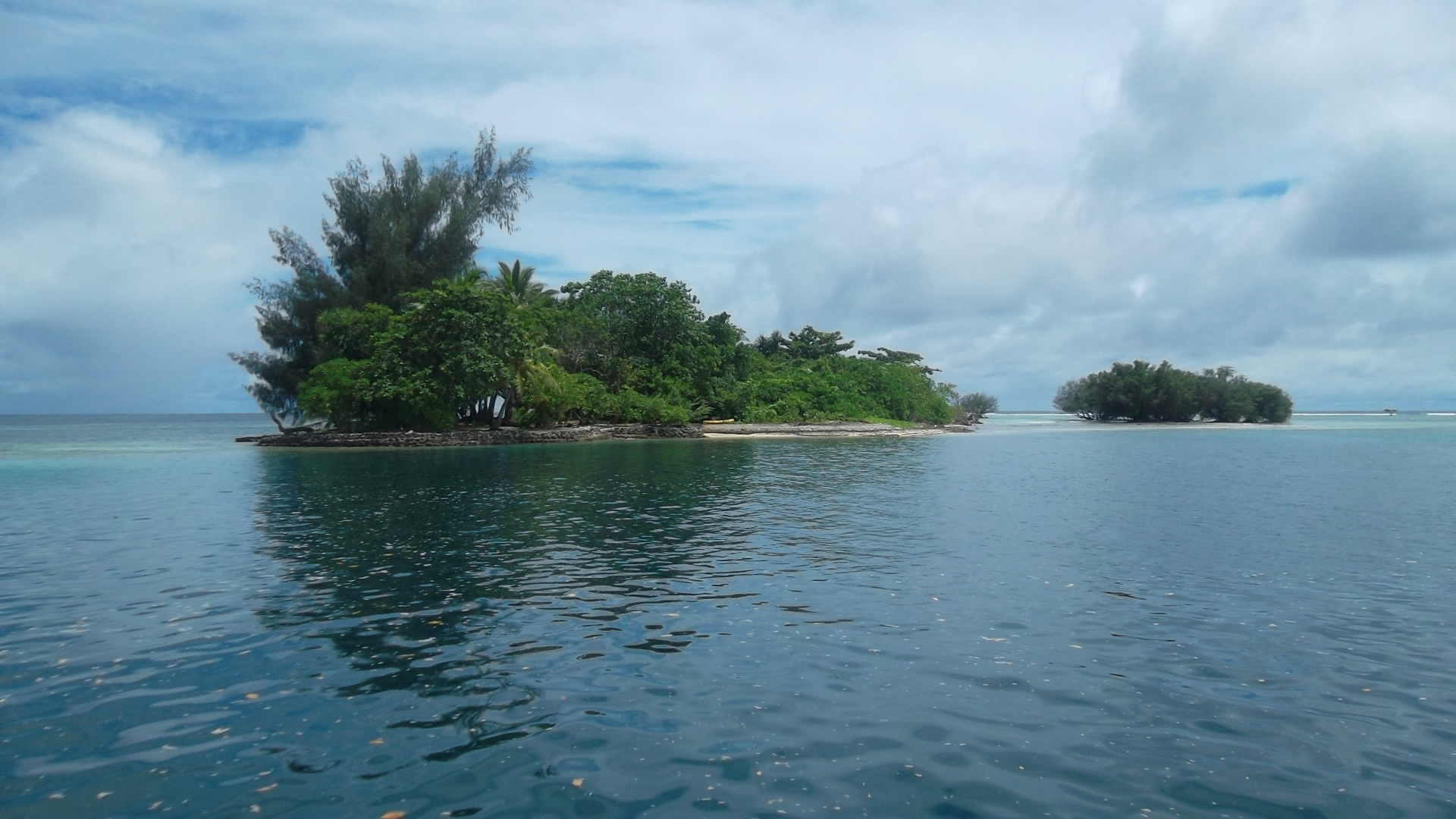

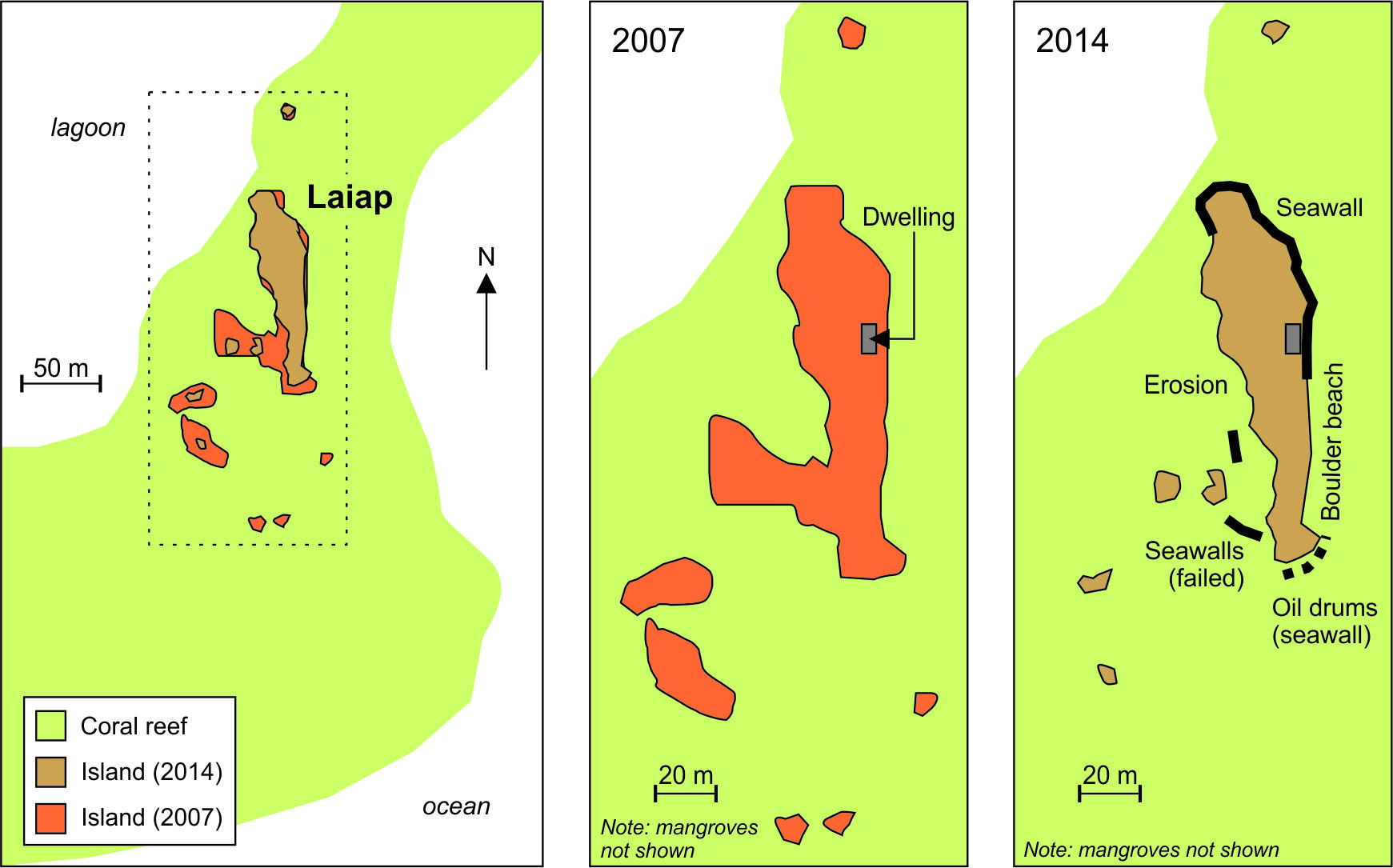
- Maps of Laiap showing the coastline as of 2007 and 2014

Geography
- Location: Pacific Ocean
- Archipelago: Pohnpei

Administration
- Federated States of Micronesia
- State: Pohnpei State
- Municipaliy: Kitti

Additional information
- Time zone: UTC+11

Laiap, also known as Rainbow Island, is a reef island in the Kitti municipality of Pohnpei, Pohnpei State, Federated States of Micronesia. A private island owned by the Christian family, it hosts a house whose second story is open for guests to stay in. The other islands in its vicinity are Nahlap to the west, Nahtik to the east and Ros beyond Nahtik. Reefs nearby Laiap include Aren, Tehiak and Mwudoakoa.

Erosion poses an immediate threat to the survival of the island; it lost considerable land area on its southern end from 2007 to 2014. Artificial seawalls were erected to combat the erosion, however the southern wall failed and collapsed.

== See also ==
- Uhsapw – Another small offshore island of Pohnpei
