= Oroluk Island =

Island in Pohnpei State, Federal States of Micronesia

Coordinates: 7°38′N 155°10′E

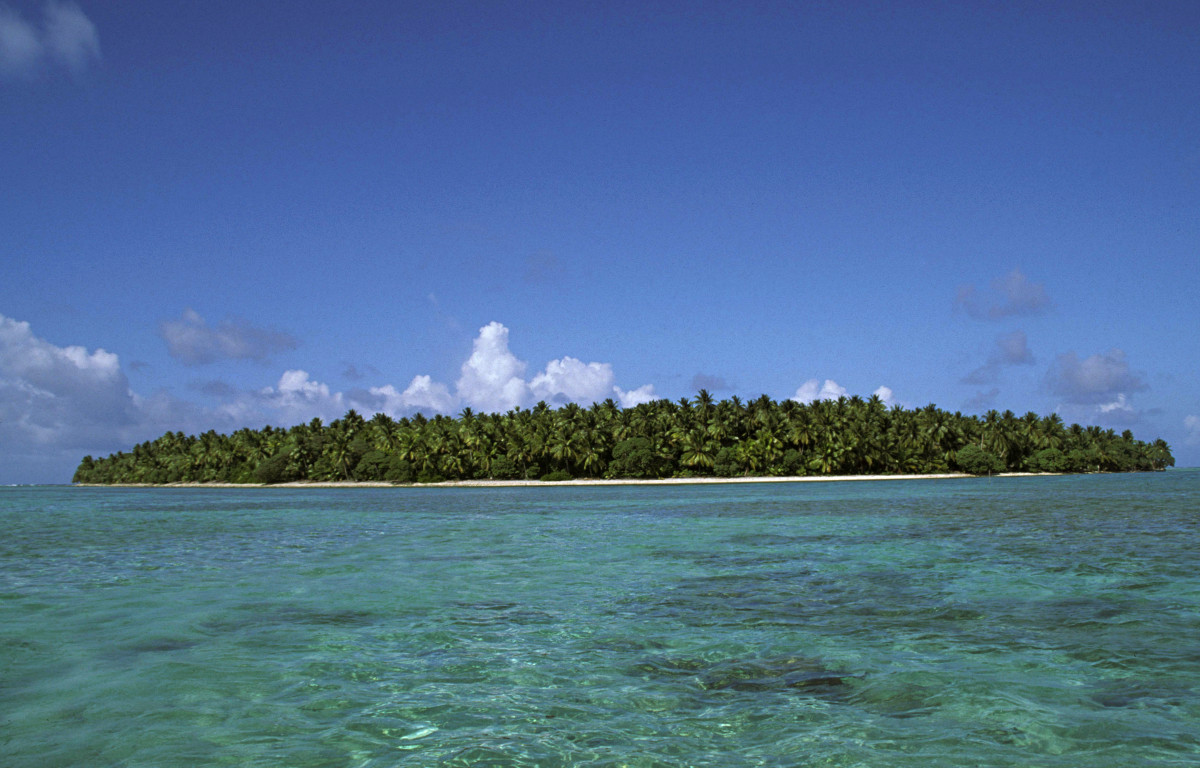
A view of Oroluk Islet, the only islet in the very large Oroluk Atoll from the sea, Pohnpei, Federated States of Micronesia

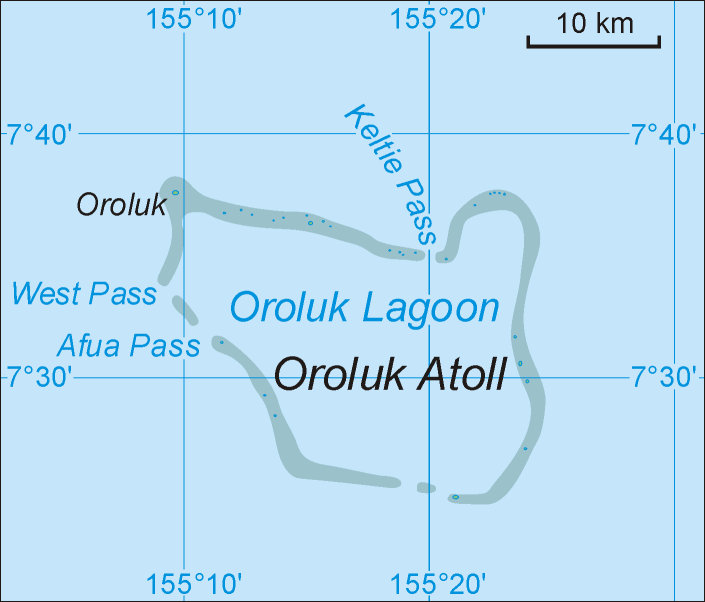
Map of Orolu Atoll with Oroluk island

Oroluk Island is one of the islets of Oroluk Atoll, part of the State of Pohnpei (Federated States of Micronesia). The islet is 0.13 km^{2} in size. As of 2023, Oroluk has a small population consisting of 6 individuals. Previously, the main industries were agriculture and fishing.

== History ==
The Oroluk Atoll was discovered by Spanish navigator Alonso de Arellano in 1565 on board of the patache San Lucas, who charted it as Mira Cómo Vas (Look how you're going in Spanish). It was also later visited by the Spanish naval officer Felipe Tompson on 7 April 1773, who charted it as the Bajo Triste (the Sad Shoal in Spanish) due to its "horrible aspect" in his own words. Oroluk Island was charted by Tompson as San Agustín.

== See also ==
- Desert island
- List of islands
