= Kitti, Federated States of Micronesia =

Municipality in Micronesia

Coordinates: 6°50′30″N 158°12′30″E

Kitti
- Municipality
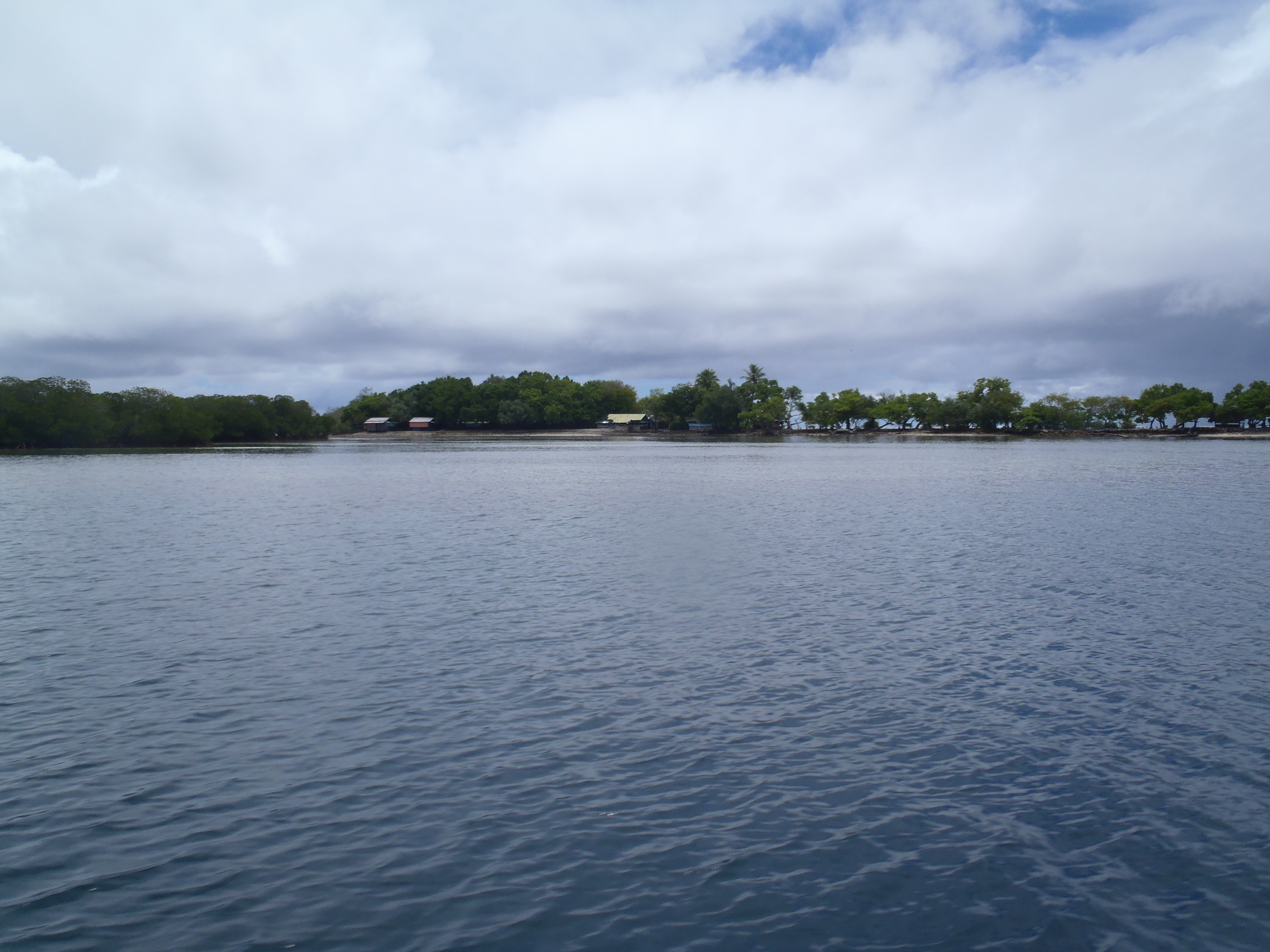
- Nahlap

- Flag Seal
- Interactive map of Kitti
- Country: Federated States of Micronesia
- State: Pohnpei State

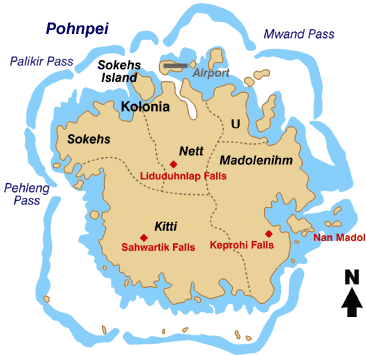
Map of Pohnpei Island showing the municipalities.

Kitti, also written as Kiti, is one of the twelve administrative divisions of the Micronesian state of Pohnpei. It is located in the southwest of the island of Pohnpei, to the south of Mount Nanlaud.

== Education ==
Pohnpei State Department of Education operates public schools:

- Nanpei Memorial High School a.k.a. Kitti High School
- Enipein School
- Nanpei Memorial Elementary School
- Pehleng Elementary School
- Rohi Elementary School
- Salapwuk Elementary School
- Seinwar Elementary School
- Wone Elementary School

== See also ==
- Laiap – A reef island in Kitti
- Uhsapw – A reef island in Kitti
- Madolenihmw – Another municipality of Pohnpei State
- Sokehs – Another municipality of Pohnpei State
- U, Pohnpei – Another municipality of Pohnpei State
- Nett – Another municipality of Pohnpei State
- Kapingamarangi – Another municipality of Pohnpei State
- Pingelap – Another municipality of Pohnpei State
- Sapwuahfik – Another municipality of Pohnpei State
- Nukuoro – Another municipality of Pohnpei State
- Mokil – Another municipality of Pohnpei State
- Kolonia – Another municipality of Pohnpei State

== Climate ==
Kitti has a tropical rainforest climate (Af) with very heavy rainfall year-round.

Climate data for Kitti
Month	Jan	Feb	Mar	Apr	May	Jun	Jul	Aug	Sep	Oct	Nov	Dec	Year
Mean daily maximum °C (°F)	29.4 (85.0)	29.8 (85.6)	30.1 (86.2)	29.8 (85.7)	30.3 (86.6)	29.9 (85.9)	29.6 (85.3)	29.6 (85.2)	29.7 (85.4)	29.9 (85.9)	30.2 (86.4)	29.6 (85.3)	29.8 (85.7)
Daily mean °C (°F)	26.5 (79.7)	26.8 (80.2)	26.8 (80.3)	26.8 (80.2)	27.1 (80.8)	26.8 (80.2)	26.3 (79.3)	26.3 (79.4)	26.4 (79.6)	26.6 (79.8)	26.8 (80.3)	26.6 (79.8)	26.7 (80.0)
Mean daily minimum °C (°F)	23.6 (74.4)	23.8 (74.8)	23.6 (74.5)	23.7 (74.7)	23.9 (75.0)	23.6 (74.5)	22.9 (73.3)	23.1 (73.6)	23.2 (73.8)	23.2 (73.7)	23.4 (74.2)	23.5 (74.3)	23.5 (74.2)
Average rainfall mm (inches)	441.5 (17.380)	331.5 (13.050)	378.5 (14.900)	504.2 (19.850)	493.3 (19.420)	496.1 (19.530)	501.4 (19.740)	556.3 (21.900)	517.1 (20.360)	544.1 (21.420)	420.1 (16.540)	411.0 (16.180)	5,595.1 (220.27)
Source: (rainfall)
