= Uhsapw =

Island in Pohnpei State, Federal States of Micronesia

Coordinates: 6°47′26″N 158°14′3″E

Uhsapw is a small island off the south coast of Pohnpei in the Federated States of Micronesia. It lies near Enipein Pah in southern Kitti Municipality. It is covered in greenery, with a small landing point on its western shore.
