= William Raven =

English master mariner, naval officer and merchant (1756-1814)

- Born: October 1756; England
- Died: 14 August 1814 (aged 57); England
- Known for: landowner, merchant ship's master, shipowner, trader

William Raven (1756–1814) was an English master mariner, naval officer and merchant.

He joined the British navy in 1779 in the West Indies. He was appointed to command the sloop Tobago on 24 March in that year, suggesting he had considerable maritime experience before joining the navy. He joined the Albion at Barbados as master and was twice wounded in 1780. He went on to be master of the Grampus for three years. In 1791, he was briefly master on the navy vessel Duke.

He had left, or was on leave from, the navy by 1792 when he captain and part-owner of the Britannia for a voyage to New South Wales. On the outward voyage the ship carried stores for the colony and after unloading them the vessel went in search of whales and seals off the coast of New South Wales and New Zealand. While in command of Britannia under contract to the British East India Company, he mapped the Loyalty Islands of Maré, Lifou, Tiga and Ouvéa between August 1793 and May 1796.

He was in navy service again and was made a Lieutenant 20 April 1797. He commanded the naval store ship HMS Buffalo in Australian and New Zealand waters from 1797 until 1799.

Raven was granted 100 acres (40 ha) of land in the vicinity of Tennyson Point, New South Wales in 1795, plus another 285 acres (115 ha) in 1799. The grant was known as Grove Farm. These Eastern Farms, now Kissing Point, properties were managed for him by the brewer James Squire of Kissing Point until Squire's death in 1822. The tip of the peninsula into the Parramatta River at Tennyson Point is now called Raven Point.
