= Toluk (Palau) =

Plate used as money and prestige object in Palau

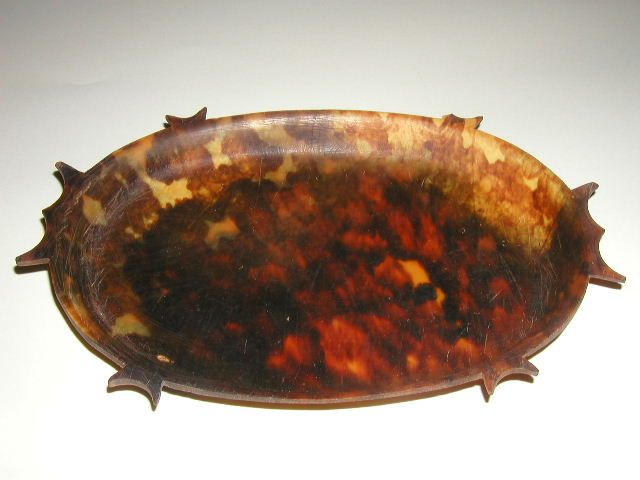
Example of toluk

Toluk is a type of valuable traditionally used as currency among the women of Palau.

Toluk were originally designed to be used as serving vessels, but have since become ceremonial objects exchanged between women to denote significant life events. They are created by an artisan known as a dachelbai using the shell of a captured hawksbill sea turtle, whose shell is broken into its individual plates; these are heated in freshwater and molded using a wooden form into the shape of a bowl. This is allowed to cool before being removed; cold water may be used to aid in the process. An artist then polishes the bowl and decorates its edges with carved ornaments. Surface decoration is generally shunned to point up the natural patterns found in the shell, and consequently decoration is usually limited to abstract shapes at the bowl's edges; what these decorations signify is unknown, but they may be meant to recall the wings of a flying frigate bird. Portions of shell which were not used in the creation of the toluk may be crafted into ornaments which are highly prized. By 1976 it was recorded that toluk were rarely made, and that by 1971 only two men were acknowledged for their prowess in manipulating turtle shells, but that their time was largely taken up with making jewelry for sale to tourists. The reduction of use of turtle shells beyond that date was held to be due to measures taken by the conservation movement to preserve turtles.

Toluk are exchanged between families, rather than among members of a single family; they are offered to female in-laws as a form of ritual payment for goods or services. Once received, they are carefully kept and become part of a family's material wealth. Older examples are generally prized far more highly than newer ones due not only to their histories but to the patina which they acquire over time. Sometimes they would be used to accept food offerings presented to the spirits of the house; they were also used in serving important people. Traditionally they would be exchanged in the presence of men, in a ceremony which followed the men's own ritual of trading traditional currency.

Because of their prominence in Palauan culture, toluk have inspired elements of the design of the Palau Freedom Memorial and the logo of Palau's PAN Fund.

Examples of toluk may be found in the collections of the British Museum; the Metropolitan Museum of Art; the Museum of Fine Arts, Boston; the Field Museum of Natural History; the Royal Ontario Museum; and the Bowers Museum.
