= Languages of the Federated States of Micronesia =

Despite its small size, the Federated States of Micronesia is a multilingual country: according to Ethnologue there are 17 living and endemic languages in the country of 115,000 people. 89 % of the population is literate.

== English ==
Most of the population knows English and it's the primary language of commerce and diplomacy. Furthermore, English is the working language of the Congress, although according to the Constitution knowledge of English cannot be a precondition for becoming a Congress representative.

== Endemic languages ==
The endemic languages of the country are an important. According to the law, in order to get Micronesian citizenship through application, the applicant must demonstrate knowledge in at least one of the country's endemic languages.

Besides English eight endemic languages enjoy official language status on state-level:

State	Official languages	Source
Yap	endemic languages of the state (Yapese, Ulithian, Woleaian, Satawalese) and English	
Chuuk	Chuukese and English	
Pohnpei	Pohnpeian and English	
Kosrae	Kosraean and English	

The endemic languages of the country are distributed as follow:

Rank	Language	Language family	Number of speakers
1	Chuukese	Micronesian	45,900
2	Pohnpeian	Micronesian	30,000
3	Kosraean	Micronesian	8,000
4	Mortlockese	Micronesian	5,900
5	Yapese	Admiralty Islands?	5,130
6	Ulithian	Micronesian	3,000
7	Kapingamarangi	Polynesian	3,000
8	Pingelapese	Micronesian	3,000
9	Woleaian	Micronesian	1,700
10	Mokilese	Micronesian	1,500
11	Puluwat	Micronesian	1,400
12	Pááfang	Micronesian	1,300
13	Namonuito	Micronesian	940
14	Nukuoro	Polynesian	700
15	Ngatikese	Micronesian	700
16	Satawalese	Micronesian	500
17	Nguluwan	Admiralty Islands	50
18	Ngatikese Creole	Creole	30

== Foreign languages ==
Some eldery folk knows fluent Japanese. This is due to the fact that the Federated States of Micronesia was a colony of the Japanese Empire till the end of World War II.
