= Chuukese =

Chuukese (also Trukese) may refer to:

- anything from
  - Chuuk State
  - Chuuk Lagoon
- Chuukese people
- Chuukese language
