= Banaban =

Banaban(s) may refer to:

- Anything of, from, or related to the people of Banaba over the centuries
  - Banabans, a Micronesian ethnic group related to or simply a resident of Banaba
  - Banaban language, a Micronesian language
