= Pohnpeic languages =

Language from Austronesian language

Pohnpeic
- Ponapeic
- Geographic distribution: Micronesia
- Linguistic classification: Austronesian: Malayo-Polynesian; Oceanic; Micronesian; Micronesian Proper; Nuclear Micronesian; Chuukic-Pohnpeic; Pohnpeic

Language codes
- Glottolog: pona1248
- Map of the Micronesian languages; Pohnpeic languages are shaded in pink, while the Chuukic languages are red.

Pohnpeic, also rendered Ponapeic, is a subgroup of the Chuukic–Pohnpeic branch of Micronesian in the Austronesian language family. The languages are primarily spoken in Pohnpei State of the Federated States of Micronesia.

== Languages ==
- Mokilese
- Pingelapese
- Pohnpeian
- Ngatikese

== Innovations ==
Pohnpeic languages are distinct from the closely related Chuukic languages as a result of uniquely developed innovations. One such innovation is nasal substitution, where the first element in a consonant geminate becomes a homorganic nasal consonant. An example of this change is seen where Proto-Chuukic-Pohnpeic */kkaŋ/ 'sharp' became Mokilese /iŋkɔŋ/, whereas in Chuukese it is /kken/.

== Phonology ==
Proto-Pohnpeic reflexes of Proto-Oceanic consonants
Proto-Oceanic	*p	*t	*k		*s, *nj	*ns, *j	*j	*mp	*mp, *ŋp	*nt, *nd	*ŋk	*m	*m, *ŋm	*n	*ɲ	*ŋ	*w	*y	*d,R	*l
Proto-Micronesian	*f	*t	*k	*T	*s	*S	*Z	*p	*pʷ	*c	*x	*m	*mʷ	*n	*ɲ	*ŋ	*w	*y	*r	*l
Proto-Chuukic-Pohnpeic	*f	*t	*k	*j	*t	*t	*∅	*p	*pʷ	*c	*∅,r^{3}	*m	*mʷ	*n	*ɲ	*ŋ	*w	*y	*r	*l
Proto-Pohnpeic	*p, ∅^{2}	*j,∅^{1}{_i,u,e^{4}}	*k	*j	*t̻	*t̻	*∅	*p^{1}	*pʷ	*c	*∅,r^{3}	*m	*mʷ	*n	*∅,n{high V_}	*ŋ	*w	*y	*r	*l

^{1} In the Pohnpeic languages, geminate obstruents are realized as homorganic nasal-obstruent clusters.
^{2} Often before /i/.
^{3} Before /a/.
^{4} The reflex is *∅ sporadically before PMc *e.

== Reconstructed vocabulary ==
Reconstructed Proto-Pohnpeic Vocabulary
Proto-Pohnpeic	English Gloss	Modern Language Reflexes
*cana-k,cana-ko	be hung up, to hang up	PON tɛnɛ-k, MOK sɔnɔ
*palia	day after tomorrow	PON pali, MOK pali
*payipayi	sea urchin	PON pɛypɛy, MOK pɔypɔy
*wara	neck	PON wɛrɛ 'his/her neck', MOK wɔr
