= Pingelapese language =

Micronesian language

Pingelapese
- Native to: Micronesia
- Region: Pingelap
- Ethnicity: (undated figure of >2,000 Pingelapese)
- Native speakers: (2,500 cited 1991); All users: 4,500
- Language family: Austronesian: Malayo-Polynesian; Oceanic; Micronesian; Nuclear Micronesian; Chuukic–Pohnpeic; Pohnpeic; Pingelapese
- Writing system: Latin script

Language codes
- ISO 639-3: pif
- Glottolog: ping1243
- ELP: Pingelapese
- Pingelapese is classified as Severely Endangered by the UNESCO Atlas of the World's Languages in Danger.

The Pingelapese language is a Micronesian language native to Pingelap, an atoll in the state of Pohnpei in the Federated States of Micronesia. This atoll is the homeland of the Pingelapese people, consisting of a three-square-mile (7.8 km^{2}) range of uninhabited small coral islets, Daekae and Sukora, and the inhabited islet, Pingelap. These islands partially make up the Caroline Islands.

Due to natural disasters and emigration consequent to European and U.S. influence, the local population in Pingelap is small. There are at least 2,000 Pingelapese people worldwide.

Although the official language of the Pohnpei State is English, 200 of the 250 Pingelap atoll residents and 1,200 Pohnpei residents speak Pingelapese. The Pingelapese language is used for face-to-face communication among speakers of all ages and is classified as vigorous. Documentation efforts, including work by linguist Leilani Welley-Biza recording elder knowledge, have preserved cultural and historical aspects of the language. The Doahkaesa and King of Pingelap, Berysin D. Salomon, and traditional leaders maintain the language and cultural heritage through Pingelapese customary practices.

== Classification ==
Pingelapese is a Micronesian language within the Austronesian language family. It belongs to the Chuukic–Pohnpeic branch, sharing 83% lexical similarity with Mokilese and 79% with Pohnpeian.

== Current status ==
Foreign influence and emigration have affected the language's stability. Many Pingelapese have relocated to more populated areas or to the United States, creating pressure on language maintenance. Educational emphasis on foreign languages, particularly English, has impacted intergenerational transmission of Pingelapese.

== History ==
The language developed after Austronesian peoples voyaged eastward from Taiwan approximately 5,000 years ago, reaching Micronesia about 3,000 years later. Morton et al. estimate that Micronesians have inhabited Pingelap for approximately 1,000 years, predating European contact by about 800 years.

=== Origin and linguistic influences ===
Oral histories offer conflicting linguistic origins that are evident in the language's vocabulary and structure. The primary debate centers on whether Pingelapese has stronger Kosraean or Yapese foundations. This is evident in key terminology, such as the coexistence of Doahkaesa (borrowed from Kosraean) and 'Aewa (native Pingelapese), both meaning "king."

The traditional oral history, formerly maintained by the Nahno of Pingelap (a title holder responsible for linguistic and cultural preservation), describes periods of contact and settlement that explain various linguistic borrowings. These accounts document interactions with Kosraeans, Pohnpeians, and other island groups that contributed loanwords and grammatical influences.

== Sociolinguistic aspects ==
=== Traditional language preservation ===
The Nahno of Pingelap historically served as keeper of language traditions and oral literature. This role involved preserving linguistic knowledge, formal speech patterns, and ritual language to be transmitted to the Ouwa (chief) and descendants.

=== Naming practices ===
Traditional Pingelapese naming conventions include a process where descriptive phrases become proper names. Names often incorporated physical characteristics or perceived destiny. For example, Doahkaesa Iengiringir was named Iengiringir (meaning "rumble" or "tremble") based on his physical impact.

=== Religious influence ===
The introduction of Christianity in the 19th century significantly expanded Pingelapese vocabulary and discourse patterns. Church language introduced new concepts, genres of speech, and liturgical vocabulary. Religious texts are among the earliest written Pingelapese and helped establish orthographic conventions and literary forms. Christian religious terminology has become common in everyday speech; terms for abstract concepts such as "faith", "salvation", and "sin" have entered the lexicon. The church setting also fostered formal registers of speech that differ from everyday conversation.

== Phonology ==
Pingelapese has several distinctive features within Micronesian languages, including an expanded vowel inventory and unique phonological processes. Like other Pohnpeic languages, it maintains contrasts between plain and velarized consonants, but is notable for having an eight-vowel system, which is the largest reported among Pohnpeic languages.

=== Consonants ===
Pingelapese has a relatively small consonant inventory, lacking phonemic voicing and aspiration contrasts.

	Bilabial		Dental/ Alveolar	Dorsal	Glottal
	plain	labial	Dental/ Alveolar	Dorsal	Glottal
Nasal	m	mʷˠ	n	ŋ	
Plosive	p	pʷˠ	t̪	k	(ʔ)
Fricative			s		
Approximant		w	l	j	
Trill			r		

- /mʷˠ pʷˠ/ are considered labiovelar by Hattori (2012:19–20). They have less rounded variants word-finally: [mᵝˠ p̚ᵝˠ].
- The plosives may be unreleased word-finally: [p̚ p̚ᵝˠ t̪̚ k̚].
- A glottal stop [ʔ] is sometimes pronounced before word-initial vowels, though this is non-phonemic.
- The lateral /l/ is described as having a velar articulation [lˠ].
- The trill /r/ has utterance-final realizations, a voiceless [r̥] and a voiced-to-voiceless [rr̥] version.

=== Vowels ===
The vowel system in Pingelapese shows a symmetrical arrangement with four heights of [-round] [-back] vowels and [+round] [+back] vowels. Each vowel has both short and long versions:

	Front		Central		Back	
	short	long	short	long	short	long
Close	i	iː			u	uː
Close-mid	e	eː			o	oː
Open-mid	ɛ	ɛː			ɔ	ɔː
Open			a	aː	ɒ	ɒː

- The high front vowel [i] has a more open allophone [ɪ] before alveolar nasals, trills, and laterals.
- Although /a/ has been traditionally analyzed as a centered vowel [ä], Hattori (2012:21) argues it is phonologically front, based on the language's symmetrical system of [-round] [-back] and [+round] [+back] vowels.
- Good & Welley (1989:2–4) originally identified seven vowel phonemes in Pingelapese. However, Hattori (2012:22–3) discovered an eighth vowel phoneme /ɒ/, making Pingelapese the first recorded Pohnpeic language with an eight-vowel system. This discovery was confirmed through fieldwork with both younger and elderly speakers in Mwalok and Pingelap atoll.

=== Phonological processes ===
Pingelapese has several notable phonological processes:

- Vowel shortening, a common feature across Micronesian languages.
- Low vowel dissimilation, where the first of two low vowels in successive syllables is raised to /ɛ/. While Pingelapese is the only Pohnpeic language to show this process, it is also present in various Micronesian languages, as well as Ere, Southern Paamese, and in the Southern Vanuatu subgroup.
- Historical changes from Proto-Pohnpeic /o/ to either /ɔ/ or /ɒ/ in various contexts.

=== Historical phonology ===
Pingelapese reflexes of Proto-Oceanic consonants
Proto-Oceanic	*mp	*mp,ŋp	*p	*m	*m,ŋm	*k	*ŋk	*ŋ	*y	*w	*t		*s,nj	*ns,j	*j	*nt,nd	*d,R	*l	*n	*ɲ
Proto Micronesian	*p	*pʷ	*f	*m	*mʷ	*k	*x	*ŋ	*y	*w	*t	*T	*s	*S	*Z	*c	*r	*l	*n	*ɲ
Proto Chuukic-Pohnpeic	*p	*pʷ	*f	*m	*mʷ	*k	*∅,r^{3}	*ŋ	*y	*w	*t	*j	*t	*t	∅	*c	*r	*l	*n	*ɲ
Proto-Pohnpeic	*p^{1}	*pʷ	*p, ∅^{2}	*m	*mʷ	*k	*∅,r^{3}	*ŋ	*y	*w	*j,∅^{1}{_i,u,e^{4}}	*j	*t	*t	∅	* c	*r	*l	*n	*∅,n{high V_}
Pingelapese	*p^{1}	*pʷ	*p, ∅^{2}	*m	*mʷ	*k	*∅,r^{3}	*ŋ	*∅,y	*w	*s^{1},∅{_i,u,e^{4}}	*s	*t̻	*t̻	∅	*s	*r	*l	*n	*∅,n{high V_}

^{1} In the Pohnpeic languages, geminate obstruents are realized as homorganic nasal-obstruent clusters.
^{2} Often before /i/.
^{3} Before /a/.
^{4} The reflex is *∅ sporadically before PMc *e.

== Grammar ==
=== Sentence structure ===
Pingelapese has four primary sentence types: transitive, intransitive, existential, and equational sentences.

==== Transitive sentences ====
The verbs in transitive sentences have two defining features. First, the verb must be an action verb denoting a physically performable activity (e.g., drink, sit, drive). Second, the verb requires a direct object as the recipient of the action. These sentences maintain a fixed Subject–verb–object word order (SVO). In active transitive sentences, the subject assumes the semantic role of agent, while the object functions as the patient. For example:

Susan audaeh-da kaep eu.
Susan fill-up cup ART
"Susan filled the cup."

==== Intransitive sentences ====
Intransitive sentences feature verbs that operate without objects and must be either stative or active. Stative verbs describe states affecting the subject, while active verbs denote actions performed by the subject. The basic word order is Subject–Verb (SV), as demonstrated below:

Richard marep.
Richard wink
"Richard winked."

While Subject–Verb is the default order, Verb–Subject (VS) order is permitted in specific contexts, particularly with unaccusative verbs or when governed by discourse pragmatics. Notably, intransitive constructions with post-verbal subjects often function as existential sentences, particularly when introducing new information. This overlap between intransitive and existential constructions is a distinctive feature of Pingelapese syntax.

==== Existential sentences ====
Existential sentences primarily function to establish the presence or absence of entities. These constructions characteristically display post-verbal subject ordering, particularly in narrative contexts where new characters or objects are introduced. When referring to previously established entities, the subject typically comes before the verb.

The Pingelapese language contains a limited set of existential verbs:

- minae "to exist"
- soh "to not exist"
- dir "to exist in large numbers"
- daeri "to be finished"

These verbs consistently take post-verbal subjects and are important in narrative discourse, particularly for introducing new characters or elements to a story.

==== Verbal equational sentences ====
While many Micronesian languages permit verbless equational constructions, Pingelapese uses verbal elements in such sentences. The language uses evidential markers e/ae to equate noun phrases or form interrogatives. The choice between e and ae reflects the speaker's certainty:

- e is a "high evidential marker" (HEV), indicating speaker certainty
- ae is a "low evidential marker" (LEV), indicating speaker uncertainty

Examples:

Calvin daekah Brenda e soaun-padahk-pwi
Calvin and Brenda HEV AGT-teach-PL
"Calvin and Brenda are teachers."

Calvin daekah Brenda ae soaun-padahk-pwi?
Calvin and Brenda LEV AGT-teach-PL
"Are Calvin and Brenda teachers?"

==== Direct questions ====
Question formation in Pingelapese primarily uses interrogative words (ish "who", dah "what", ngahd "when"). In the absence of question words, interrogatives are marked by non-falling terminal intonation. The intonational contour either remains level or exhibits a slight upward movement at the sentence terminus.

=== Morphology ===
Like other Micronesian languages, Pingelapese uses morphological processes to modify word meanings. The language predominantly uses verbal suffixes, with fewer verbal prefixes.

The suffix -kin "with"/"at" exemplifies a common verbal suffix:

ius → ius-kin
use → use-with
"to use" → "to use with"

mwahu → mwahu-kin
good → good-at
"to be good" → "to be good at"

The prefix sa- "not" demonstrates one of the few verbal prefixes:

pwung → sa-pwung
correct → not-correct
"to be correct" → "to be incorrect"

Directional suffixes append to verbs to indicate spatial orientation. The base verb alu "to walk" illustrates this system:

Suffix	Meaning	Example
-da	up	aluh-da "to walk up"
-di	down	aluh-di "to walk down"
-eng	away from speaker and listener	aluh-eng "to walk away"

Stand-alone auxiliary verbs derive from the pronoun auxiliary complex by omitting person/number morphemes from ae, aen, e, and en.

Directional suffixes extend beyond motion verbs to convey figurative meanings when attached to non-motion verbs:

Directional suffix	Motion meaning	Non-motion meaning
-da	up	Onset of a state
-di	down	Action completion
-la	away from	State change initiation
-doa	towards	Action continuation to temporal point
-sang	from	Comparative

Preverbal prefixes:
Prefix	Meaning	Root	Root meaning	Combined form	Result meaning
sa-	"not"	pwung	"to be correct"	sa-pwung	"to be incorrect"
sou-	"the opposite of"	mwahw	"to be good"	sou-mwahu	"to be ill"
ka-	"to cause"	maehla	"to die"	ka-maehla	"to kill"

==== Reduplication and triplication ====
Pingelapese uses both reduplication and triplication as grammatical processes. Reduplication indicates continuous verbal action, while triplication denotes ongoing action. Triplication is rare cross-linguistically; the only other languages reported to use it are Tibetan, Chintang, Bantawa, and Thao. For example:

wou → wou-wou → wou-wou-wou
{"to bark"} → "barking" → {"still barking"}

Pingelapese has two strategies for handling consonant clusters that arise from these processes:

1. For homorganic consonants:

- The first consonant is eliminated
- The preceding vowel undergoes lengthening

Example:

pap → pah-pap → pah-pah-pap
{"to swim"} → "swimming" → {"still swimming"}

2. For non-homorganic consonants:

- A vowel is inserted between the consonants

Example:

wen → wene-wen → wene-wene-wen
{"to dance"} → "dancing" → {"still dancing"}

The most frequent pattern involves three-phoneme reduplication, followed by four-phoneme reduplication. Examples of four-phoneme reduplication include:

kusupaek → kusu-kusupaek
surf-coming → CONT.REDUP-surf-coming
"coming of surf over reef in low tide" → "continuous coming of surf"

kerir → keri-kerir
secret-love → CONT.REDUP-secret-love
"to love in secret" → "continuing to love in secret"

=== Pronouns ===
In Pingelapese, subject pronouns (personal pronouns that function as the subject of a verb) evolved from either Proto-Micronesian subject agreement markers or an independent pronoun set. Unlike English, Pingelapese distinguishes between singular, dual, and plural forms in its pronominal system, with additional distinction between inclusive and exclusive first-person forms. The following table shows examples of subject pronouns in all three (four for the first person) forms.

A unique feature of Pingelapese is its pronoun-auxiliary complex, where pronouns combine with auxiliary verbs in a way not found in other Micronesian languages.

		Singular	Dual	Plural
1st person	exclusive	ngaei	sae	kihs
1st person	inclusive	ngaei	kisa	kisahsi
2nd person		kae	koamwa	koamwahsi
3rd person		ae	rae	rae

=== Numerals ===
Pingelapese has at least five sets of numeral classifiers, used when combining numbers with nouns. These classifiers correspond to the physical or functional properties of the counted objects. Each set designates a different set of words to represent the numerals 1 through 9, with a unique form for 10 in the non-specific/counting set:

number	long objects (trees, roads)	animate objects (people, fish, birds)	small or partial objects	general nouns (couples, stream, land)	non-specific counting
1	aepas	aemen	ekis	eu	aehd
2	risepas	riaemaen	risekis	riau	ari
3	silipas	silimaen	silikis	silu	esil
4	pahpas	pahmaen	pahkis	pahu	aepoang
5	luhpas	luhmaen	lumikis	limau	alim
6	woanaepas	woanaemaen	woanikis	wonou	awoahn
7	isipas	isimaen	isikis	isu	aeis
8	waelaepas	waelaemaen	waelikis	waelu	aewael
9	duaepas	duaemaen	duaukis	duau	add
10					eisik

For numbers above 9, Pingelapese uses a single form regardless of the counted object:

number	form
10	eisaek
20	rieisaek
30	silihsaek
40	pahisaek
50	limeisaek
60	woneisaek
70	isihsaek
80	waelihsaek
90	tueisaek

number	form
100	epwiki
200	repwiki
300	silipwiki
400	pahpwiki
500	limepwiki
600	wonepwiki
700	isipwiki
800	waelipwiki
900	duepwiki

number	form
1,000	kid
10,000	naen
100,000	lop
1,000,000	rar
10,000,000	dep
100,000,000	sap
1,000,000,000	lik

When reading a number in Pingelapese, the biggest number is read out first, then the smaller numbers in succession. For example, the number 1,769 is read out as kid isipwiki woneisaek duoau.

== Vocabulary ==
=== Place-based terminology ===
A distinctive feature of the Pingelapese lexicon is its use of place names to identify foreign objects and concepts:

==== Food terminology ====
Many foods are linguistically marked with their geographical place of origin:

- uht en Ruhk (banana from Chuuk)
- karer en Kusai (lime from Kosrae)
- sakau en Kusai (kava from Kosrae)
- uht en Pihsih (banana from Fiji)
- mei en Sahmwoa (breadfruit from Samoa)
- uht en Iap (banana from Yap)
- mengat en Seipahn (banana from Saipan)
- uht en Menihle (banana from Manila)

==== Geographic terminology ====
Saekaraekapw, one of Pingelap's four villages, has a namesake community in Pohnpei's Madolenihmw municipality, preserving migration patterns in place names.

=== Language contact and loanwords ===
==== Indigenous language contact ====
- Kosraean: contributed vocabulary including Doahkaesa (king) and other terms
- Pohnpeian: extensive lexical sharing due to geographic proximity and cultural exchange

==== Colonial-era linguistic borrowings ====
- German: introduced terms during colonial administration, such as maing (from mein), adapted as a respectful address for high-ranking individuals
- Japanese: contributed vocabulary during Japanese administration, including denki (from 電気 (denki)), which narrowed in meaning from "electricity" to specifically "light bulb"
- Spanish: lexical contributions reflected in vocabulary and preserved in cultural expressions like the Pingelapese dance Din Dihn (from "tin")
- English: extensive modern borrowing, particularly for technological and administrative terminology

==== Semantic shift in loanwords ====
Foreign terms often undergo semantic narrowing or widening when adopted into Pingelapese. For example, Pohnpeians call a large steel pot kwatilain (from Kwajalein), an example of how place names can become common nouns with specific meanings.

=== Political and administrative terminology ===
During German administration, the Pohnpeian political vocabulary was restructured, introducing terms like Nahnmwarki for regional rulers, replacing the previous system with a single paramount chief.

== Calendar system ==
=== Months ===
The Pingelapese language has a 12-month calendar system corresponding to the lunar calendar, with the month names as follows:

Number	Pingelapese month	Equivalent Gregorian calendar month
1	Kahlaek	March
2	Soaunpwonginwehla	April
3	Paelaekwar	May
4	Soledahn	June
5	Sokosok	July
6	Idihd	August
7	Maesaenaeir	September
8	Kaepihsukoru	October
9	Pihkaer	November
10	Ihkaehwa	December
11	Aepwaelap	January
12	Memwahleu	February

=== Days of the week ===
In the Pingelapese culture, Monday is the first day of the week. The names for the days of the week come from the Pingelapese non-specific object numeral set. Each number follows the prefix niy- to form the name for that day of the week, as follows:

Number	Day	Translation
1	niyaehd	Monday
2	niyari	Tuesday
3	niyesil	Wednesday
4	niyaepang	Thursday
5	niyalim	Friday
6	[data missing]	Saturday
7	[data missing]	Sunday

=== Dates ===
Each date of the lunar month has a specific name in the calendar:

1. E Sukoru (new moon)
2. E Ling
3. E Sehm
4. Masepeng
5. Masalim
6. Mesawon
7. Meseis
8. Mesawel
9. Woalduadu
10. Medel
11. Siepwong
12. Arkohnge
13. Sekainpe
14. Woalopwo
15. Woalemwahu
16. Mas (full moon)
17. Er
18. Lelidi
19. Koahmwaloa
20. Edemen Koahmwaloa
21. Apeleng
22. Sengek
23. Wesengek
24. Dapas
25. Dapasmeing
26. Kerdakehleng
27. Areiso
28. Semwenpal
29. Ihla
30. Esep
31. Epei

== Orthography ==
Pingelapese usage varies by context and location. On Pingelap atoll and in other communities, Pingelapese is the primary language of home communication, while church services employ a mix of Pingelapese, Pohnpeian, and English. However, education, administration, and business are conducted primarily in English and Pohnpeian. The language is primarily spoken; while Pingelapese speakers typically develop strong literacy skills in English and Pohnpeian, they have few opportunities to read or write in their native language.

=== Literacy challenges ===
At the Pingelap atoll elementary school, children face significant challenges learning to write in both Pingelapese and Pohnpeian. First-grade students must begin their literacy education with non-native language materials, as educational resources are only available in Pohnpeian and English.

Specific learning difficulties arise, such as when Pingelapese children were presented with Pohnpeian educational materials of a poster showing a coconut tree labeled with the Pohnpeian word uhpw "drinking coconut", they attempted to correlate these letters with their native word pen, with the letters ⟨u⟩, ⟨h⟩, and ⟨pw⟩ being correlated with ⟨p⟩, ⟨e⟩, and ⟨n⟩ respectively, leading to confusion between grapheme–phoneme relationships.

=== Historical development ===
While many Micronesian language communities established orthography committees in the 1970s, Pingelapese never reached this stage and so has no standardized writing system. This has led to inconsistent spellings in official documents, including the atoll name itself (Pingilap/Pingelap).

A distinct Pingelapese orthography was taught at the Pingelap atoll elementary school around the same period. Presently, this system is primarily known only on the atoll itself, with elderly community members remembering it the most. Several teachers have attempted to revive this early orthography, but personnel changes have prevented its continuous implementation.

Pingelapese speakers in Mwalok, Deke Sokehs, typically use Pohnpeian orthography for everyday writing, such as song lyrics. However, on Pingelap atoll, people maintain that traditional histories and legends should be written in the early orthography, while administrative documents may use Pohnpeian conventions.

=== System ===
As mentioned above, Pingelapese lacks a standardized orthography, due to the lack of establishing any official orthography committee. However, a Pohnpeian-based orthography has been adapted and is increasingly used for administrative and educational purposes, as shown in the table below:

Orthography	Phoneme
i	/i, j/ (Note: Represents the glide /j/ before a vowel.)
e	/e/
ae (Note: May also be spelled as ⟨e⟩, but causes contextual ambiguities; c.f., Soahn en ahla laid. "John went fishing" vs. Soahn aen ahla laid. "John will go fishing".)	/ɛ/
a	/a/
u	/u/
o	/o/
oa	/ɔ, ɒ/ (Note: Despite Hattori (2012)'s findings of an eighth vowel phoneme /ɒ/, it is still written as ⟨oa⟩, leading to minimal pairs of the same spelling but different pronunciation; i.e., doak /tɔk/ "to point at", doak /tɒk/ "turtle shell". However, this is mostly lexical and can be distinguished by context.)
h	/ː/ (Note: Used to mark a long vowel after the vowel symbol; e.g., ⟨ae⟩ /ɛ/ → ⟨aeh⟩ /ɛː/.)
p	/p/
pw	/pʷ/
d	/t/
k	/k/
s	/s/
m	/m/
mw	/mʷ/
n	/n/
ng	/ŋ/
l	/l/
r	/r/
w	/w/

== Bibliography ==
- Good, Elaine; Welley, Weldis (1989), Papers in Kosraean and Ponapeic, Pacific Linguistics, ISBN 978-0858833906
- Hattori, Ryoko (2012), Preverbal Particles in Pingelapese, Ann Arbor, ISBN 9781267817211
- Rehg, Kenneth L.; Sohl, Damian G. (1981), Ponapean Reference Grammar, PALI language texts: Micronesia, University of Hawaii Press, ISBN 978-0824807184
