= Pohnpeian language =

Austronesian language spoken on Pohnpei island in Micronesia

Pohnpeian
- Mahsen en Pohnpei [honorific] Lokaiahn Pohnpei [common]
- Native to: Micronesia
- Region: Pohnpei
- Native speakers: (29,000 cited 2001)
- Language family: Austronesian: Malayo-Polynesian; Oceanic; Micronesian; Nuclear Micronesian; Chuukic–Pohnpeic; Pohnpeic; Pohnpeian
- Dialects: Kitti
- Writing system: Latin script

Language codes
- ISO 639-2: pon
- ISO 639-3: pon
- Glottolog: pohn1238

Pohnpeian is a Micronesian language spoken as the indigenous language of the island of Pohnpei in the Caroline Islands. Pohnpeian has approximately 30,000 (estimated) native speakers living in Pohnpei and its outlying atolls and islands with another 10,000-15,000 (estimated) living off island in parts of the US mainland, Hawaii, and Guam. It is the second-most widely spoken native language of the Federated States of Micronesia, the first being Chuukese.

Pohnpeian features a "high language", referred to as Meing or Mahsen en Meing including specialized vocabulary used when speaking to, or about people of high rank.

== Classification ==
Pohnpeian is most closely related to the Chuukic languages of Chuuk (formerly Truk). Ngatikese, Pingelapese and Mwokilese of the Pohnpeic languages are closely related languages to Pohnpeian. Pohnpeian shares 81% lexical similarity with Pingelapese, 75% with Mokilese, and 36% with Chuukese.

Pohnpeian employs a great deal of loanwords from colonial languages such as English, Japanese, Spanish, and German. However, these loanwords are neither spelled nor pronounced exactly the same as the source language. Examples of these loanwords include:

- kairu, meaning "frog", borrowed from the Japanese 蛙, kaeru
- iakiu, meaning "baseball", borrowed from the Japanese 野球, yakyū
- kana, meaning "to win", borrowed from the Spanish ganar
- pwoht, meaning "boat", borrowed from the English boat
- mahlen, meaning "to draw or paint a picture", borrowed from the German malen

== Phonology ==
The modern Pohnpeian orthography uses twenty letters — sixteen single letters and four digraphs — collated in a unique order:

a	e	i	o	oa	u	h	k	l	m	mw	n	ng	p	pw	r	s	d	t	w

As German missionaries designed an early form of the orthography, Pohnpeian spelling uses -h to mark a long vowel, rather like German: dohl 'mountain'. The IPA equivalents of written Pohnpeian are as follows:

Consonants
	Bilabial	Dental/ Alveolar	Laminal	Palatal	Velar	Labiovelar
Nasal	m ⟨m⟩	n ⟨n⟩			ŋ ⟨ng⟩	mʷ ⟨mw⟩ (Note: /mʷ/ and /pʷ/ are rounded before a vowel, but have unrounded allophones when in final position.)
Plosive	p ⟨p⟩	t ⟨d⟩	t̻ ⟨t⟩		k ⟨k⟩	pʷ ⟨pw⟩
Fricative		sʲ ⟨s⟩				
Approximant		l ⟨l⟩		j ⟨i⟩ (Note: In Pohnpeian, ⟨i⟩ is used to represent /j/ when written, and ⟨u⟩ may represent /w/.)		w ⟨u, w⟩
Trill/Flap		r ⟨r⟩				

Vowels
	Front	Back
High	i ⟨i⟩ iː ⟨ih⟩	u ⟨u⟩ uː ⟨uh⟩
High-mid	e ⟨e⟩ (Note: Written Pohnpeian does not distinguish between [e] and [ɛ]: both are ⟨e⟩.) eː ⟨eh⟩	o ⟨o⟩ oː ⟨oh⟩
Low-mid	ɛ ⟨e⟩ ɛː ⟨eh⟩	ɔ ⟨oa⟩ ɔː ⟨oah⟩
Low	ɐ ⟨a⟩ ɐː ⟨ah⟩	

=== Phonotactics ===
Pohnpeian phonotactics generally allow syllables consisting of consonants (C) and vowels (V) accordingly: V, VC, CV, CVC. This basic system is complicated by Pohnpeian orthographical conventions and phonological processes. Orthographically, ⟨i⟩ is used to represent /j/, though it is often unwritten; -u is realized as /w/; and ⟨h⟩ indicates a long vowel (a spelling convention inherited from German). Thus, sahu is pronounced [sʲaːw], never [sʲahu]. Consecutive vowels are glided with [j] or [w], depending on the relative height and order of the vowels:

- diar is said [tijar] ("to find")
- toai is said [ ̻tɔji] ("to have a runny nose")
- suwed is said [sʲuwɛt] ("bad")
- lou is said [lowu] ("cooled")

While the glide [j] is never written other than as ⟨i⟩ the glide [w] may be written between ⟨u⟩ and a non-high vowel: suwed ("bad").

Words beginning in nasal consonant clusters may be pronounced as written, or with a leading prothetic vowel. The roundedness of the prothetic vowel depends on that of the adjacent consonant cluster and the first written syllable. For example:

- nta can be said [i ̻n ̻ta] ("blood")
- ngkapwan may be [iŋkapʷan] ("a while ago")
- mpwer is optionally [umʷpʷɛr] ("twin")
- ngkopw may be [uŋkopʷ] (a species of crab)

Pohnpeian orthography renders the consonant clusters [mʷpʷ] and [mʷmʷ] as mpw and mmw, respectively.

==== Substitution and assimilation ====
Further phonological constraints frequently impact the pronunciation and spelling of consonant clusters, triggered variously by reduplication and assimilation into neighboring sounds. Sound changes, especially in reduplication, are often reflected by a change in spelling. However, processes triggered by affixes as well as adjacent words are not indicated in spelling. In order to inflect, derive, and pronounce Pohnpeian words properly, the order of operations must generally begin with liquid assimilation, followed by nasal assimilation, and end with nasal substitution.

First, liquid assimilation is seen most often in reduplication alongside spelling changes. By this process, liquids /l/ and /r/ are assimilated into the following alveolar (coronal) consonant: nur > nunnur ("contract").

The second process, nasal assimilation, presents two varieties: partial and complete. In partial nasal assimilation, /n/ assimilates with a following stop consonant to produce [mp], [mʷpʷ], [mm], [mʷmʷ], or [ŋk]. For example, the prefix nan- ("in") produces:

- nanpar, pronounced [nampar] ("trade wind season")
- nanpwungara, pronounced [namʷpʷuŋara] ("between them")
- nankep, pronounced [naŋkep] ("inlet")

Partial assimilation also occurs across word boundaries: kilin pwihk is pronounced [kilimʷ pʷiːk]. The allophone of /n/ is written "n" in these cases.

In complete nasal assimilation, /n/ assimilates into adjacent liquid consonants to produce /ll/ or /rr/: lin + linenek > lillinenek ("oversexed," spelling change from reduplication); nanrek is said [narrɛk] ("season of plenty"). Complete nasal assimilation also occurs across word boundaries: pahn lingan is said [paːlliŋan] ("will be beautiful").

The third process, nasal substitution, also presents two varieties. Both varieties of nasal substitution affect adjacent consonants of the same type: alveolar (coronal), bilabial, or velar. The first variety is often triggered by reduplication, resulting in spelling changes: sel is reduplicated to sensel ("tired").

The second variety of nasal substitution, limited to bilabial and velar consonants, occurs across word and morpheme boundaries:

- kalap pahn is pronounced as if it were kalam pahn ("always will be")
- Soulik kin soupisek is pronounced as if it were souling kin soupisek ("Soulik is [habitually] busy")

This second variety of the nasal substitution process is phonemically more productive than the first: it includes all results possible in the first variety, as well as additional cluster combinations, indicated in green below. Some alveolar pairs produce an intervening vowel, represented as V below. Not all clusters are possible, and not all are assimilative, however.

Alveolar (coronal) consonants
	-s	-d	-t	-n	-l	-r
s-	ns	—	—	—	sVl	sVr
d-	dVs	nd	—	dVn	dVl	—
t-	tVs	—	nt	tVn	tVl	tVr
n-	ns	nd	nt	nn	ll	—
l-	ns	nd	nt	—	ll	—
r-	ns	nd	nt	nn	ll	rr

Bilabial consonants
	-p	-pw	-m	-mw
p-	mp	mpw	mm	mmw
pw-	mp	mpw	mm	mmw
m-	mp	mpw	mm	mmw
mw-	mp	mpw	mm	mmw

Velar consonants
	-k	-ng
k-	ngk	ngng
ng-	ngk	ngng

By following the order of operations, reduplication of the word sel ("tired") progresses thus: *selsel > *sessel (liquid assimilation) > sensel (nasal substitution). In this case, the same result is achieved by nasal substitution alone.

Pohnpeian reflexes of Proto Oceanic consonants
Proto Oceanic	Proto Micronesian	Proto Chuukic-Pohnpeic	Proto Pohnpeic	Pohnpeian
*mp	*p	*p	*p (Note: In the Pohnpeic languages, geminate obstruents are realized as homorganic nasal-obstruent clusters.)	p
*mp,ŋp	*pʷ	*pʷ	*pʷ	pʷ
*p	*f	*f	*p, ∅ (Note: Often before /i/.)	p, ∅
*m	*m	*m	*m	m
*m,ŋm	*mʷ	*mʷ	*mʷ	mʷ
*k	*k	*k	*k	k
*ŋk	*x	*∅,r (Note: Before /a/.)	*∅,r	∅,r
*ŋ	*ŋ	*ŋ	*ŋ	ŋ
*y	*y	*y	*y	∅,y
*w	*w	*w	*w	w
*t	*t	*t	*j,∅{_i,u,e (Note: The reflex is *∅ sporadically before PMc *e.)}	s,∅{_i,u,e}
	*T	*j	*j	s
*s,nj	*s	*t	*t	t̻
*ns,j	*S	*t	*t	t̻
*j	*Z	∅	*∅	∅
*nt,nd	*c	*c	* c	t̺
*d,R	*r	*r	*r	r
*l	*l	*l	*l	l
*n	*n	*n	*n	n
*ɲ	*ɲ	*ɲ	*∅,n{high V_}	∅,n{high V_}

== Grammar ==
Pohnpeian word order is nominally SVO. Depending on the grammatical function, the head may come before or after its dependents. Like many Austronesian languages, Pohnpeian focus marking interacts with transitivity and relative clauses (see Austronesian alignment). Its range of grammatically acceptable sentence structures is more generally (1) noun phrase, (2) verb phrase (3) other noun phrases, where the contents of the leading noun phrase may vary according to the speaker's focus. If the leading noun phrase is not the subject, it is followed by the focus particle me. Normally, the object phrase is last among predicates:

Focus	Pohnpeian
Neutral	Lahpo pahn inauriki {kisin pwehlet} wahro that-guy will lash sennit-this canoe-that That guy will lash the canoe with this sennit.
Subject	Lahpo me pahn inauriki {kisin pwehlet} wahro. that-guy FOC will lash sennit-this canoe-that That guy will lash the canoe with this sennit.
Object	Wahro me lahpo pahn inauriki {kisin pwehlet}. canoe-that FOC that-guy will lash sennit-this The canoe is what that guy will lash with this sennit.
Noun phrase	{Kisin pwehlet} me lahpo pahn inauriki wahro. sennit-this FOC that-guy will lash canoe-that This sennit is what that guy will lash that canoe with.

=== Honorific speech ===
Honorific speech is used in several settings as a way of showing honor and respect to older ones, those who have been assigned titles, royalty, and in almost all religious settings. Depending on the second or third person, a given sentence may vary widely because honorific speech comprises a separate vocabulary, including all parts of speech and topics both lofty and mundane. Examples include:

- pohnkoiohlap (to eat with the nahnmwarki)
- likena (high chief's wife)
- pahnkupwur (chest; normally mwarmware)
- pahnpwoal (armpit; normally pahnpeh)
- dauso (anus, normally pwoar)
- kelipa (to joke, normally kamwan)
- kaluhlu (to vomit)
- keipweni (an interjection)

Although at times in the absence of a specific honorific word, the word Ketin is often used to indicate that the proceeding verb is honoric (Koht kin ketin kapikada would translate to "God creates"). The word Ketin has no meaning by itself. However, when used as a prefix, it is a sure way to distinguish honorific speech (Kiong has the meaning of "Give", Ketkiong would be the honorific version of the same word).

=== Nouns ===
Nouns may be singular, dual, or plural in number, and generally inflect by suffixing. Numerals usually follow the nouns they count, and agree in noun class. Groups of nouns and adjectives comprise noun phrases. Pohnpeian transitive sentences contain up to three noun phrases.

Inalienable, or direct, possession is marked by personal suffixes. Other forms of possession are indicated through possessive classifiers. The construct suffix -n appears in oblique positions, such as possessive phrases. Words ending in n, however, are followed by the clitic en. Possessive phrases generally add this construct state to a classifier noun, followed by the possessor, and lastly the possessum. For example:

weren ohlo war
POSSESSIVECLASS:CANOE-n that-man canoe
"that man's canoe"

Some possessive classifiers, namely ah and nah, may precede the possessum:

nein ohlo (nah) rasaras
CLASS:-n that-man [CLASS] saw
"that man's saw"

Possessive classifiers can also occur with more than one following noun. The classifier itself may give a particular meaning to the possessum:

- pwihk means "pig"
- nah pwihk means "his (live) pig"
- ah pwihk means "his (butchered) pig"
- kene pwihk means "his pig (to eat)"

==== Determiners ====
Determiners in Pohnpeian may occurs as enclitics which are bound morphemes or independent words and occur in three basic types: demonstrative modifiers, pointing demonstratives, and demonstrative pronouns. All of the determiners have a three-way diectic distinction of proximal (near the speaker), medial (near the listener), and distal (away from both the speaker and listener), as well as an emphatic/non-emphatic distinction. Demonstratives are generally, suffixed to or following the last word of a noun phrase. Orthographically singular clitics are suffixed to the word, while plurals are written as separate words.

===== Demonstrative modifiers =====
Demonstrative modifiers occur as enclitics with nouns and always occupy the last element in a noun phrase.

Non-Emphatic Demonstrative Modifiers
	Singular	Plural
proximal	-e(t)	-ka(t)
medial	-en	-kan
distal	-o	-kau, -koa, -ko

The singular emphatic demonstrative modifiers are formed by suffixing the non-emphatic singular forms to appropriate numeral classifier for the noun, such as men- for animate nouns. The plural forms are always constructed by suffixing the non-emphatic plural form to pwu- regardless of the singular classifier.

Emphatic Demonstrative Modifiers (for animate nouns)
	Singular	Plural
proximal	mene(t)	pwuka(t)
medial	menen	pwukan
distal	meno	pwukau

Examples of the demonstrative modifiers in use are

Demonstrative modifier examples
	Non-Emphatic		Emphatic	
	Singular	Plural	Singular	Plural
'this man by me'	ohlet	ohl akat	ohl menet	ohl pwukat
'that man by you'	ohlen	ohl akan	ohl menen	ohl pwukan
'that man over there'	ohlo	ohl akau	ohl meno	ohl pwukau

===== Pointing modifiers =====
Pointing modifiers are determiners that can stand alone in a noun phrase and are used in equational (non-verbal) sentences. They can also occur by themselves as one word sentences. They have both non-emphatic and emphatic forms.

Pointing modifiers
	Non-Emphatic		Emphatic	
	Singular	Plural	Singular	Plural
'here, by me'	ie(t)	ietakan/iehkan	ietkenen/iehkenen	ietkenenkan/iehkenenkan
'there, by you'	ien	ienakan	ienkenen	ienkenenkan
'there, away from you and me'	io	iohkan	iohkenen	iohkenenkan

Example uses of pointing modifiers:

- Iet noumw naipen 'Here is your knife'
- Ietakan noumw naip akan 'Here are your knives'
- Iet! 'Here it is!'
- Iohkan! 'There they are! (away from you and me)

===== Demonstrative pronouns =====
Demonstrative pronouns are determiners that can replace noun phrases in a verbal sentence. They have both non-emphatic and emphatic forms.

Demonstrative pronouns
	Non-Emphatic		Emphatic	
	Singular	Plural	Singular	Plural
'this/these, by me'	me(t)	metakan/mehkan	metkenen	metkenenkan
'that/those, by you'	men	menakan	menkenen	menkenenkan
'that/those, away from you and me'	mwo	mwohkan	mwohkenen	mwohkenenkan

Examples of demonstrative pronouns in use:

- Met ohla 'This is broken'
- E wahla mwo 'He/she took it there away from you and me'
- Mwohkan ohla 'Those are broken'
- E wahwei men 'He/she took it there by you'

==== Pronouns ====
Personal pronouns
			independent	subject	object
1st person	singular		ngehi	i	-ie
1st person	dual/plural	exclusive	kiht	se	-kit
1st person	dual	inclusive	kita	kita	-kita
1st person	plural	inclusive	kitail	kitail	-kitail
2nd person	singular		kowe, koh	ke	-uhk
2nd person	dual		kuwma	kumwa	-kumwa
2nd person	plural		kumwail	kumwail	-kumwail
3rd person	singular		ih	e	-
3rd person	dual		ira	ira	-ira
3rd person	plural		irail, ihr	irail, re	-irail

The relative pronoun me means "one who is" or "which," and is used with adjectives and general verbs:

- Ih me kehlail (He one strong > He is the strong one)
- Ih me mwenge (He one eat > He is the one who ate)

==== Possessive classifiers ====
Possessive classifiers are used frequently and differentiate among person, possessum, and honorific usage. Their personal forms appear below:

Personal possessive classifiers
	Singular	Dual	Plural
1st person	nei, ei/ahi	neita, ata	neitail, atail neit, aht (excl.)
2nd person	ahmw/oumw, noumw	amwa, noumwa	amwail, noumwail
2nd person	Honorific: omw, omwi		
3rd person	nah, ah	ara, neira	arail, neirail/nair
3rd person	Honorific: sapwellime		

Further possessive classifiers include:

- sapwellime (third person honorific)
- were (vehicles, canoes)
- nime (drinkable things)
- imwe (buildings, homes)
- ulunge (pillows)
- sapwe (land)
- kie (things to sleep on)
- tie (earrings)
- mware (garlands, titles, names)
- ipe (covers, sheets)
- kene (edibles)
- seike (catch of fish)

Specialized kinship classifiers include:

- kiseh (relatives)
- sawi (clan members)
- rie (sibling in Crow kinship)
- wahwah (man's sister-relation's children)
- toki (persons with whom one has had sexual intercourse)

==== Honorifics ====
Honorifics comprise a largely separate vocabulary.

Example honorific classifiers
Noun class	Honorific (Mengei)	Common (Lokaia Mengei)
canoe, vehicle	tehnwere	were
house, building	tehnpese	imwe
edibles of title holders of koanoat	koanoat	kene
land	nillime	sapwe
things to sleep on (also means mat)	moatoare	kie

==== Numbers and measure words ====
Numbers normally follow the nouns they count, however they may be pre-posed in certain situations. Numbers and measure words depend on the grammatical class and physical characteristics of the object being counted. The several number systems are grouped by linguists into three sets, reflecting their term for "ten." When naming numbers in order, natives most often use the –u class. Ngoul is an alternate word for "ten" for -pak and -sou classifiers.

Pohnpeian numerals
Noun type	Classifier	1	2	3	4	5	6	7	8	9	10
inanimate, some animate	–u	ehu	riau	siluh	pahieu	limau	weneu	isuh	waluh	duwau	eisek
times	–pak	apak	riapak	silipak	pahpak	limpak	wenepak	isipak	welipak	duwapak	eisek
piles, heaps	–mwut	emwut	riemwut	silimwut	pahmwut	limmwut	wenemwut	isimwut	walimwut	duwamwut	eisek
oblong objects	–lep	elep	rielep	sillep	pahlep	limelep	wenlep	isilep	wellep	duwelep	eisek
strips, strands, used with "piten"	–pit	epit	riepit	silipit	pahpit	limpit	wenepit	isipit	walipit	duwapit	eisek
garlands	–el	ehl	riehl	siliel	pahiel	limiel	weniel	isiel	weliel	duwehl	eisek
stalks, i.e. sugarcane	–sop	osop	riaspo	silisop	pahsop	limisop	wensop	isisop	welisop	duwasop	eisek
small round objects	–mwodol	emwodol	riemwodol	silimwodol	pahmwodol	limwomwodol	wenemwodol	isimwodol	welimwodol	duwemwodol	eisek
gusts of wind	–tumw	otumw	riotumw	silitumw	pahtumw	limatumw	wenetumw	isitumw	welitumw	duwetumw	eisek
slices	–dip	edip	riadip	silidip	pahdip	limadip	wenidip	isidip	welidip	duwadip	eisek
feces (pwise)	–sou	esou	riesou	silisou	pahsou	limisou	wensou	isisou	welisou	duwesou	eisek
bundles	–dun	odun	riadun	silidun	pahdun	limadun	wendun	isidun	welidun	duwadun	eisek
animate beings	–men	emen	riemen	silimen	pahmen	limmen	wenemen	isimen	welimen	duwemen	ehk
longness, songs, stories	–pwoat	oapwoat	rioapwoat	silipwoat	pahpwoat	limpwoat	wenepwoat	isipwoat	welipoat	duwoapwoat	ehk
parts, divisions, sides	–pali	apali	riapali	silipali	pahpali	limpali	wenepali	isipali	welipali	duwepali	ehk
strips, long, thin objects; used with "poaren"	–poar	oapoar	rioapoar	silipoar	pahpoar	limpoar	wenepoar	isipoar	welipoar	duwoapoar	ehk
leaves; used with teh	–te	ete	riete	silete	pahte	limete	wente	isite	welite	duwete	ehk
thin objects	–par	apar	riapar	silipar	pahpar	limpar	wenepar	isipar	welipar	duwapar	ehk
sheaves, bundles; used with kap	–kap	akap	riakap	silikap	pahkap	limakap	wenakap	isikap	welikap	duwakap	ehk
rows	–ka	aka	riaka	silika	pahka	limaka	weneka	isika	welika	duwaka	ehk
fronds	–pa	apa	riapa	silipa	pahpa	limpa	wenwpa	isipa	welipa	duwapa	ehk
branches; used with rah	–ra	ara	riara	silira	pahra	limara	wenera	isira	welira	duwara	ehk
cane sections	–pwuloi	opwuloi	riopwuloi	silipwuloi	pahpwuloi	limpwuloi	wenpwuloi	welipwuloi	duwopwuloi		ehk
sennit	–sel	esel	riesel	silisel	pahsel	limesel	wenesel	isisel	welisel	duwesel	ehk
yams, bananas, and other foods cooked in a stone oven uhmw	–umw	oumw	rioumw	sliuhmw	pahumw	limoumw	wenoumw	isuhmw	weluhmw	duwoumw	ngoul
nights; used with pwohng	–pwong	opwong	rioapwong	silipwong	pahpwong	limpwong	wenepwong	isipwong	welipwong	duwoapwong	ngoul
plants with a single root and many stalks, i.e., sugarcane, hibiscus, bamboo	–wel	ewel	riewel	siliwel	pahwel	limwel	wenewel	isiwel	welewel	duwewel	ngoul
small pieces or fragments of objects	–kis	ekis	riakis	silikis	pahkis	limakis	wenekis	isikis	welikis	duwakis	ngoul
(none)	ehd	ehd	ari (are)	esil	epeng	alim (alen)	oun (aun)	eis	ewel	adit (edut)	koadoangoul/kedingoul
bunches of bananas	–i	ih	rial	—	—	—	—	—	—	—	—

Higher numerals such as pwiki "hundred", kid "thousand", do not inflect for noun class. The ehd system, above is likewise not class-based.

Ordinals are formed with the prefix ka–, pronounced as ke– in certain words.

=== Verbs ===
Pohnpeian distinguishes between intransitive and transitive verbs. Transitive verbs are those with both a subject and an object. Intransitive verbs indicate most other verbal, adjectival, and adverbial relationships. Within verb phrases, aspect markers are followed by adverbs, and lastly the main verb.

Many, if not most, transitive and intransitive verbs share common roots, though their derivation is often unpredictable. Some thematic features among intransitive verbs include ablaut, reduplication, the suffix -ek, and the prefix pV, where V stands for any vowel. Thematic suffixes among transitive verbs include -ih and -VC, where C stands for any consonant. Some transitive verbs also end in a final short vowel.

Pohnpeian indicates four grammatical aspects: unrealized, habitual, durative, and perfective. Alternations in vowel length, as well as ablaut, are a salient feature of the aspect paradigm.

Pohnpeian permits relative clauses and conjoined clauses through use of conjunctions and conjunctive adverbs. The language also permits verbs within nominal clauses as gerundive clauses, finite clauses, and infinitive clauses.

Pohnpeian verbs allow for a high level of affixation. The allowable suffixes and their ordering is presented in the table below.

Verbal suffix positions
1st	2nd	3rd	4th	5th	6th	7th
-ki	-ie	-da	-la	-ehng	-ie	-ehr
	-uhk	-di	-do	-sang	-uhk	
	-	-iei	-wei		-	
	-kit	-long			-kit	
	-kita	-pene			-kita	
	-kumwa	-peseng			-kumwa	
	-ira	-seli			-ira	
	-kitail				-kitail	
	-kumwail				-kumwail	
	-irail				-irail	

==== Intransitive verbs ====
Pohnpeian intransitive verbs can be divided into the following types:

Intransitive verbs
General intransitives				Adjectives
Activity verbs			Non-Activity verbs	Adjectives
Active	Resultative	Neutral	Non-Activity verbs	Adjectives
mwenge to eat	lop to be cut	les to split, be split	mi to exist	pweipwei to be stupid

There are five verbal prefixes, which appear as bound morphemes: the causative ka-, the negatives sa- and sou-, and two other semantic modifiers ak- and li-.

Ka-, the causative prefix, makes intransitive verbs into transitive ones. It is the most productive prefix, as it is the only that can precede the other four above. It often occurs in conjunction with a reduplicative vowel suffix. For example, with luwak, "be jealous", an adjective:

- Liho luwak: That woman is jealous
- Liho kaluwak: That woman was made jealous
- Liho kaluwaka lihet: That woman made the [other] woman jealous
- Pisek, idle
- Soupisek, busy (i.e., un-idle)
- Kasoupisek, to make busy

The majority of intransitive verbs have only a transitive causative form: pweipwei > kapweipwei, "to be stupid." Among verbs where ka- is productive, only adjectives and a few resultative intransitive verbs have both intransitive and transitive causative forms. Though the prefix is productive in many active and resultative verbs, it is not productive with neutral intransitive verbs, nor for a handful of intransitives denoting bodily functions such as "sneeze" (asi), "frown" (lolok), "be full" (tip), and "be smelly" (ingirek). The prefix ka- often has assimilative allophones depending on the stem, for example:

- soai (to tell a tale) becomes koasoia (to talk)
- dou (to climb) becomes kodoudou (to trace one's ancestry)
- rir (to be hidden) becomes kerir (secret sweetheart)

As illustrated in these examples, the prefix often causes semantic differentiation, necessitating different constructions for literally causative meanings; karirala, a different form employing ka-, is used to mean "to make hidden."

Sa- and sou- negate verbs, however sou- is less productive than sa-, which itself varies in productivity according to regional dialect. The general meaning of sa- appears to be "not," while sou- apparently means "un-," thus:

- wehwe, to understand; sawehwe, to not understand
- pwung, correct; sapwung, incorrect
- nsenoh, concerned; sounsenoh, careless (i.e., un-concerned)

Like ka-, sa- displays assimilative allophony:

- ese, "to know" > sehse, "to not know"
- loalekeng, "intelligent" > soaloalekeng, "not intelligent."

Only a single example has been found of sa- preceding ka-: the word koasoakoahiek means "inappropriate," deriving from the verb koahiek, "be competent."

Ak- adds a semantic meaning of demonstration or display when combined with adjectives. When preceded by ka-, it becomes kahk-. Li- generally means "may," or "predisposed, given to" some quality or action.

===== General intransitive verbs =====
General intransitive verbs describe actions or events. They are divided into active, resultative, and neutral subtypes. For example, mwenge (to eat) and laid (to fish) are active; langada (to be hung up) and ritidi (to be closed) are resultative (static); and deidei (to sew, to be sewn) and pirap (to steal, to be stolen) are neutral — they can have either an active or a resultative meaning. Though resultative verbs sometimes resemble passive transitive verbs in English, they are in fact a class of intransitive verbs in Pohnpeian, which entirely lacks a comparable active-passive voice distinction. For example, Ohlo pahn kilel means both "That man will take a photograph" and "That man will be photographed." Reduplication is frequently productive among general intransitives and adjectives alike. Derivations often include reduplication:

- pihs > pipihs "to urinate"
- us > usuhs "to pull out">

Many intransitives are ablauted from their transitive forms, sometimes with reduplication:

- apid TR > epid INTR "to carry on one's side"
- par TR > periper INTR "to cut"

Others are derived from transitive forms through the prefix pV-, conveying a meaning of reciprocal action: kakil (stare) > pekekil (stare at one another). These reciprocal intransitives form a distinct subgroup.

A few intransitives derive from transitive roots through the suffix -ek, though this is a fossilized suffix and is no longer productive. For example, dierek (to be found) from diar (to find); dilipek (for a thatch roof to be mended) from dilip (to mend a thatch roof). Sometimes this results in two intransitive derivations of a single transitive root, usually with a semantic nuance:

- transitive wengid "to wring", intransitive wengiweng "to wring/be wrung", intransitive wengidek "to be twisted"
- transitive widinge "to deceive", intransitive widing "to deceive/be deceived", intransitive widingek "to be deceitful"

The suffix was apparently much more productive earlier in the language's history, even among active verbs.

Intransitives include verbs that incorporate their objects, in contrast with transitives, which state objects separately; this is somewhat akin to "babysitting" in English. This process sometimes results in vowel shortening within the incorporated noun. Any verbal suffixes, normally suffixed to the initial verb, follow the incorporated object. Incorporation is not possible when there is a demonstrative suffix, however:

- I pahn pereklos, I will mat-unroll
- I pahn pereki lohs, I will unroll mats
- I pahn pereki lohso, I will unroll that mat

===== Adjectives =====
Pohnpeian adjectives are a class of non-action intransitive verbs. They function in a mostly parallel way to other intransitive verbs:

- E pahn [tang/lemei] – "He will run/be cruel"
- E [tangtang/lemelemei] – "He is running/being cruel"
- E [tenge/lamai] pwutako – "He ran to/is cruel to that boy"

Many adjectives themselves can be used as commands, and have transitive counterparts.

Adjectives function as a subclass of intransitive verbs, though grammatical functions set them apart. For example, the superlative -ie is reserved for adjectives, as in lingan, "beautiful," and lingahnie, "most beautiful." Likewise reserved for adjectives is the suffix -ki, which indicates instrumentality in transitive verbs, means "to consider [beautiful]" when suffixed to an adjective. Superlatives may also appear using the ordinal numeral keieu "first." Comparatives are made through word order and the suffix -sang: Pwihke laudsang pwihko means "This pig is bigger than that pig."

One feature setting adjectives apart from non-active verbs is the productivity of the stative marker me (different from the pronoun and focus particle me), which is generally not grammatically correct with intransitive verbs of any kind:

- E mwahu, He is good; and E me mwahu, He is good!
- E mi mwo, It exists there; but not *E me mi mwo.

Another aspect setting adjectives apart from other intransitives is that adjectives precede numerals, while intransitives follow. Adjectives generally follow the head noun, though possessives and numbers with fractions precede the noun:

- pwutak, boy
  - pwutako, that boy
  - pwutak silimeno, those three boys
  - pwutak reirei silimeno, those three tall boys
  - nei pwutak silimeno, my three sons there
- orenso, that orange
  - pahkis ehuwen orenso, one-fourth of that orange
- mahio, that breadfruit
  - pahkis siluhwen mahio, three-fourths of that breadfruit

==== Transitive verbs ====
Transitive verbs consist of single roots and various suffixes upon modern intransitive verbs. Historically, intransitive verbs probably developed by dropping these transitive suffixes and ablauting.

Some transitive verbs end in -VC on intransitive forms, appearing as unablauted or without reduplication; as intransitives were likely products of final syllable dropping, the endings are rather unpredictable:

- poad > poadok, "to plant"
- id > iding, "to make fire"
- pek > pakad, "to defecate"
- dapadap > daper, "to catch"

Several transitive verbs end in -ih on intransitive roots, sometimes also with vowel changes:

- malen > mahlenih, "to draw"
- sel > salih, "to tie"
- erier > arih, "to stir, probe"

This form is the most productive and is used with loanwords. For example: mahlenih, deriving from German mahlen, means "to paint, draw."

Some transitive verbs ending in short final vowels have intransitive counterparts that lack those endings; again, ablaut and reduplication often differentiate. Examples include:

- langa > lang, "to hang up"
- doakoa > dok, "to spear"
- rese > rasaras, "to sharpen"

The short vowel ending -i appears only in -ki.

Transitive verbal suffixes include the perfective -ehr, -ki (which derives verbs from nouns; different from the noun instrumental suffix -ki and short vowel suffix), object pronoun suffixes, and a host of directional suffixes. These include -ehng (towards) and -sang (away, without).

=== Prepositions and Prepositional Nouns ===
Pohnpeian has two canonical prepositions ni and nan. Nan is used to express the containment of an object in either 2D or 3D space by another object, and ni expresses the attachment of an object to another object.

- Nan
  - Lahpo mihmi nan ihwo, 'That person is in the house.'
  - Kahto mihmi nan pingin likou, 'That cat is on the rug.'
- Ni
  - Rihngo mihmi ni pehn liho, 'That ring is on the woman's finger.'
  - Pwahlo mihmi ni kehpo, 'The crack is in the cup.'

== Basic phrases ==
Below are some basic words and phrases in Pohnpeian:

- Kaselehlie - Hello (semi-formal)
- Kaselehlie maing - Hello sir/ma'am (formal)
- Kaselehlie maing ko - Hello ladies/gentlemen (plural, formal)
- Kaselel - Hello/Goodbye (informal)
- Kalahngan - thank you (formal)
- Menlau - thank you (informal)
- edei - my name is
- edomw - your name (singular, informal)
- Ia edomw? - What is your name?
- Ia iromw? - How are you? (singular, informal)
- ia iromwi? - How are you? (singular, formal)
- Ia iromwa? - How are you? (to two people, informal)
- Ia iromwail? - How are you? (to three or more people, informal)
- ke kohsang ia? - Where are you coming from? (singular, informal)
