= Chuukese people =

Ethnic group

Chuukese
Total population
- c. 61,500

Regions with significant populations
- Federated States of Micronesia 51,000; Chuuk State
- United States: c. 10,500

Languages
- Chuukese, English

Religion
- 60% Roman Catholic; 40% Protestantism, The Church of Jesus Christ of Latter-day Saints, other

Related ethnic groups
- Micronesian peoples, Austronesian peoples

The Chuukese are a Micronesian-speaking ethnic group indigenous to the island of Chuuk and its surrounding islands and atolls. They constitute almost 49% of the population of the Federated States of Micronesia, making them by far the largest ethnic group in the country.

== Language ==
Their language is Chuukese, which belongs to the Chuukic branch of Micronesian languages, which is in turn part of the Malayo-Polynesian language family. The Malayo-Polynesian language family is a subdivision of a wider Austronesian language family, one of the world's primary language families. The language is written in a modified Latin alphabet.

== Population ==
A 2010 census showed that the Chuukese people were the fastest growing group of Pacific Islanders during the 2000s decade in the United States; they increased from a population of about 700 in the year 2000 to more than 4,000 in time for the 2010 census.

== Culture ==
=== Livelihood and housing ===
The traditional subsistence of the Chuukese is fishing. In modern times, fishing is still an important source of income for families and both men and women engage in the occupation. Traditional Chuukese homes were built using palm thatch where families maintained strong intimate bonds.

=== Religion ===
Although the Chuukese are overwhelmingly Christian, traditional beliefs in spirit possession by the dead still exist. Allegedly, these spirits overwhelmingly possess women, and spirit possession is usually brought on by family conflicts. The spirits, speaking through the women, typically admonish family members to treat each other better.

=== Traditional marriage practices ===
Traditionally, before a man could consider marriage, he needed to have experience in farming, fishing, and boat construction. He also had to be able to build his own house. When he had these skills he would inform his parents that he was ready for marriage; the parents would then search for a suitable young woman to be his wife. When they had decided on a girl, the parents of the man would visit the girl's parents. They would introduce themselves and the purpose of their visit, and discuss possible marriage with the girl's parents. If a marriage was agreed upon, the young man would stay with the girl's parents and the girl would reside with the young man's parents; this arrangement will last until the wedding day. Prior to the marriage, both families would prepare a feast which would be attended by the leaders of their respective families. According to custom, the girl's family would provide enough food for the man's family, and his family would do the same for the girl's.

There are some attitudes towards marriage among the Chuukese people that may have been retained from past tradition. While both the man and woman will desire compatible sex partners in marriage, they look even more for good workers. A person incapable of work is unlikely to be successful at marriage in Chuuk. A person is well aware of the character and abilities of those in the community, and selects a partner accordingly.
