= Namonuito =

Namonuito may be,

- Namonuito Atoll
- Namonuito language
