= Tanapag language =

Endangered Micronesian language of Saipan

Tanapag
- Native to: Northern Mariana Islands
- Region: Saipan
- Native speakers: 10 (2011)
- Language family: Austronesian: Malayo-Polynesian; Oceanic; Micronesian; Nuclear Micronesian; Chuukic; Tanapag

Language codes
- ISO 639-3: tpv
- Glottolog: tana1281
- ELP: Tanapag

Tanapag is a nearly extinct Micronesian language of the Austronesian language family. It is spoken in the Tanapag settlement of the island of Saipan in the Northern Mariana Islands. Younger people speak Chamorro instead of Tanapag, but there are also efforts being made to promote the language.

== Phonology ==
=== Consonants ===
Table of Consonant Sounds
	Bilabial	Labio-dental	Dental-alveolar	Palatal	Velar
Plosives	p, b		t, d	c, ɟ	k, ɡ
Nasals	m		n		ŋ
Fricatives		f, v	s (z), ʂ (ʐ)		x, ɣ
Lateral			(l)	(ɫ)	
Rolled			r		
Continuants	w			j	(w)

== See also ==
- Carolinian language
