= Ngatikese language =

Oceanic language spoken in Micronesia

Ngatikese
- Sapwuahfik
- Native to: Micronesia
- Region: Sapwuahfik
- Native speakers: ca. 700 (2014)
- Language family: Austronesian: Malayo-Polynesian; Oceanic; Micronesian; Nuclear Micronesian; Chuukic–Pohnpeic; Pohnpeic; Ngatikese
- Writing system: Latin script

Language codes
- ISO 639-3: (covered by Pohnpeian pon)
- Glottolog: sapw1237
- ELP: Ngatikese

Ngatikese, or Sapwuahfik, is a Micronesian language originating on Sapwuahfik atoll, Federated States of Micronesia. Of the 700 Ngatikese speakers, only about 450 live on Sapwuahfik. It was previously considered a distinct dialect of Pohnpeian, but was later reclassified as the two proved to be only partially mutually intelligible. It is currently considered vulnerable, as many of its speakers have gradually shifted to Pohnpeian.

Ngatikese has a men's register.
