= Puluwat language =

Micronesian language

Puluwatese
- Native to: Federated States of Micronesia
- Region: Poluwat
- Native speakers: (1,400 cited 1989 census)
- Language family: Austronesian: Malayo-Polynesian; Oceanic; Micronesian; Nuclear Micronesian; Chuukic; Tanapag; Puluwatese
- Dialects: Puluwatese; Pulapese

Language codes
- ISO 639-3: puw
- Glottolog: pulu1242
- ELP: Puluwatese
- Puluwat is classified as Severely Endangered by the UNESCO Atlas of the World's Languages in Danger.

Puluwatese is a Micronesian language of the Federated States of Micronesia. It is spoken on Poluwat.

== Classification ==
Puluwatese has two dialects, Pulapese and Pulusukese, both of which have low intelligibility with Satawalese (64%), Woleaian (40%), and Ulithian (21%). Puluwatese does however have slightly higher lexical similarity with Satawalese and Carolinian (88%), Mortlockese (83%), Woleaian (82%), Chuukese (81%), and Ulithian (72%).

== Orthography ==
=== Vowels ===
- a - [æ]
- á - [a]
- e - [ɛ]
- é - [e]
- i - [i]
- o - [o]
- ó - [ɔ]
- u - [u]
- ú - [ɨ]

=== Consonants ===
- c - [t͡ʃ]
- f - [f]
- h - [h]
- k - [k]
- l - [l]
- m - [m]
- mw - [mʷˠ]
- n - [n]
- ng - [ŋ]
- p - [pʷˠ]
- r - [r]
- ŕ - [ɹ]
- s - [s]
- t - [t]
- w - [w]
- y - [j]

Long vowels and consonants are indicated by doubling their letters.

== Phonology ==
=== Syllable structure ===
The syllables in Puluwatese begin with either consonants or geminate consonants followed by a vowel or geminate vowel and can be ended with either a consonant or a vowel. The various syllable structure types are as follows:

- CV: hi 'we'
- CVV: rúú 'bone'
- CVC: mwoŕ 'blow'
- CVVC: niiy 'kill-him'
- CVVCC: wiill 'wheel'
- CVCC: wutt 'boathouse'
- CCV: ppi 'sand'
- CCVV: kkúú 'fingernails'
- CCVC: llón 'in'
- CCVVC: mmwiik 'pepper'
- CCVCC: ppóhh 'steady'

Note that <mw> here stands for a single consonant phoneme /mʷ/ and not a sequence of two separate consonants.

=== Consonants ===
		Labial		Coronal	Palatal	Velar	Glottal
		plain	lab.	Coronal	Palatal	Velar	Glottal
Stop		p	pʷ	t	tʃ	k	
Fricative		f		s			h
Nasal		m	mʷ	n		ŋ	
Rhotic	tap			(ɾ)			
Rhotic	trill			r			
Lateral				l			
Approximant			w	ɻ	j		

/tʃ, ɻ/ may also be heard as [ts, ɾ] in free variation among speakers.

In the voicing of consonants, nasals, liquids, and glides are always voiced. Voiceless consonants consist of stops and fricatives and usually follow a pattern of being voiceless initially, weakly voiced medially, and voiceless at the end.

Puluwatese consists of long consonants ccòwo (heavy) and short consonants ppel (light). Long consonants are considered more forceful and are often used to display an emotion such as fear. Such an example is the word for hide-and seek/ tow-the-ghost: likohhomà. In this case, the "hh" long consonant creates a heavy sound that is used to frighten children.

An interesting pattern in consonant replacement occurs where /w-/ and /y-/ glides replace /k-/ in some words. Some of the most commonly heard forms are as follows:

- kapong, yapong-i-y to greet
- kereker, yereker rat
- wo, ko you (polite)
- woow, koow coconut fiber
- yáát, káát boy
- ya-mwar, ka-mwar to hold
- yéé, kéé fishhook

Other consonant interchange patterns involve /c/ and /r/ which can be traced back to Chuukese influence. Oftentimes, the Chuukese consonant /c/ and the Puluwat /r/ correspond such as in the words:

- caw, raw slow
- céccén, réccén wet
- ceec, reec to tremble

/k/ and /kk/ may also be used interchangeably as follows:

- kltekit small, yátakkit small
- rak only, mákk write

While consonant clusters do not occur in Puluwatese, there are several instances of consonant combinations occurring. These consonant combinations are often interrupted by a vowel referred to as an Excrescent. Sometimes, the intersyllabic vowel is lost and a consonant cluster can occur. The historically noted consonant combinations are as follows:

- kf: yekiyekféngann to think together
- np: tayikonepék fish species
- nf: pwonféngann to promise together
- nm: yinekinmann serious
- nl: fanefanló patient
- nw: yóónwuur canoe part
- ngf: llónghamwol termite
- wp: liyawpenik cormorant
- wh: yiwowhungetá to raise

=== Vowels ===
	Front	Central	Back
High	i	ɨ	u
Mid	e	ə	o
Low	æ	a	ɔ

After sounds /pʷ, mʷ/, /a/ may be raised and fronted as [æ], and back vowels may be slightly centered as [ü, ö, ɔ̈].

/i/ can be heard as [ɪ] when in closed syllables.

Vowel distribution is limited and occur finally. Vowels may present themselves as short or long and can change to a lower pitch when lengthened. While all syllables are stressed fairly evenly, stressed syllables are often denoted as capitals. The following are two rules that determine stressed syllables:

1. Final vowels in CVCV words are stressed such as in hanA hibiscus, klyÒ outrigger boom, ylfA? where?, and ylwE then
2. Syllables that follow the letter h are normally stressed: yapawahAalò to dry out, pahAlò to drift away, yekúhÚ rak just a little

Unstressed syllables often occur as excrescent vowels except for when they follow h- and are denoted by breves. Unstressed vowels occur in the following instances:

- Vowels in between reduplicated words are often unstressed:
  - ngeŕ- ĕ -ngeŕ to sew
  - ngeŕ- ĭ -ngeŕ to gnaw
  - pwul- ă -pwul red
  - yale- ĕ yái young man
  - yál- ĭ -yel retreat
- Vowels between bases and suffixes (directional and first person plural exclusive pronoun suffix):
  - fanúw- ĕ -mám our
  - mópw- ŭ -ló to drown
  - nlike- ĕ -mem- ĕ -ló attack us all
  - yállew- ŭ -ló worse
- Vowels following -n, the construct form suffix and the initial consonant:
  - n + p: lúkúnĭ paliyewowuh beyond the outer side
  - n + k: máánĭ kiiiiló hunger death
  - n + m: roonĭ maan floating ripe coconuts
  - n + y: wòònĭ Yáley on Yáley
- Vowels in loan words that often contain consonant clusters:
  - s+t: Sĭtien Steven
  - m+ s: Samĭson Samson
  - f+k: Maŕĕkús Markus
- In words that follow the shape of C_{1}V_{1}C_{2}V_{2}C_{3}V_{3} the V_{1} and V_{3} vowels are normally stressed while the V_{2} has a week stress:
  - TilĭmE male name
  - yeŕŏmA a tree

== Pronouns ==
Independent pronouns, subject pronouns, and polite vocatives are the three types of pronouns that occur in differing distributions. Independent pronouns occur alone and in equational sentences, they precede noun or noun phrases, as well as subject pronouns, or the prepositions me, and, and with. Subject pronouns never occur as objects and always precede verbs, normally with intervening particles. The use of polite vocatives are rare in daily life and even rarer in texts. However, the known polite vocatives are included in the table below.

	Before proper names, 'person'	Clause - final
To a male or males	ko, ŕewe	wo, ko keen ŕewe
To a female or females	ne	ne
To males or females	keen	kææmi

The polite vocatives that occur before a proper name may most closely be translated to Mr, Miss, or Mrs, but there are no accurate translations for the clause-final polite vocatives.

Independent and subject pronouns occur in seven propositions: first person singular (1s, 2s, 3s), first person plural inclusive (1p inc), first person plural exclusive (1p exc, 2p, 3p), and is illustrated in the table below.

	Independent Pronoun	Subject Pronoun
1s	ngaang, nga	yiy, wu
2s	yeen	wo
3s	yiiy	ye, ya
1p inc	kiir	hi, hay
1p exc	yææmen	yæy
2p	yææmi	yaw, yɔw
3p	yiiŕ	ŕe, ŕa

== Word order ==
For transitive sentences, Puluwatese follows a SVO word order but an SV or VS structure for intransitive sentences.

Wuŕumwo ya yákékkél-ee-ŕ yát-e-kkit mákk.
Wuŕumwo 3S teach-SV-3PL.obj child-EV-small writing
'Wuŕumwo taught the children writing.'

Ye-ray eŕemahán Polowat a fáyi-to.
one-CL man Puluwat perf come-hither
'A Puluwat man has come.'

Ye pwe le mááló manú-hmwaay we.
3S FUT IMM.FUT die DEM-SV-sick DEM
'the sick man will soon die.'

== Counting system ==
Numbers in Puluwatese are confusing because there is such an intricate system of suffixes for counting different objects. In general, the base of the number stays the same and suffixes for different objects are added onto each base of the number. Suffixes that are added onto the base numbers can significantly alter the meaning of the word such as in the example ye-ray woong (a small turtle) and yee-w woong (a large turtle). For counted objects, suffixes can greatly change their meaning such as in ye-fay teŕeec (a spool of thread) and ye-met teŕeec (a piece of thread). The most common counting suffixes are outlined in the following table.

Sequential	General -oow	Animate -ray -man	Long Objects -fór	Round Objects -fay	Flat Objects -réé	Hundreds -pwúkúw
1. yé-ét	yee-w	ye-ray	-ye	-ye	-yé	-ye
2. rúúw	ŕuw-oow	ŕuw-oow	ŕuwe-ray	ŕuwe	ŕuwa	ŕuwa
3. yéél	yeluu-w	yelú-ray	-yelú	-yelú	-yelú	-yelú
4. fáán	f-oow	fa-ray	fó-ór -fé	-faa	-faa	-fa
5. liim	lim-oow	lim-man	-lif	-lime -lif	-limaa	-lima
6. woon	won-oow	wono-man	-wono	-wono	-wonaa	-wona
7. fúús	féh-úúw	fúú-man	-fúú	-fúú	-fúú	-fúú
8. wall	wal-uuw	walú-man	-wale	-walu	walú	-walu
9. ttiw	ttiw-oow	ttiwa-man	-ttiwa	-ttiwa	-ttiwaa	-ttiwa
how many?	fit-oow	fite-ray	-fite	-fite	-fitaa	-fitaa

Sequential counting is used for rapid counting and can be combined in order to count two or three numbers without intervention. For example, "one, two" can be counted as yét-é-ŕúúw and "three, four" as yei-u-fáán. This sequential counting can be used as a system for rapid pair counting of objects such as coconuts and breadfruit.

The general suffixes are used for objects that do not have a specified suffix. Suffixes for objects are either drawn upon from the general set or any of the other sets.

The animate suffixes are applied to humans, animals, weapons, tools, musical instruments, and other miscellaneous artifacts. The animate suffixes are the only ones to have two different classifiers: -ray and -man with -man being the Chuukese cognate for -mén.

Long object suffixes are used for objects that are long and slender such as rope (yámeey), vehicles (citosa), and cigarettes (suupwa).

Round objects suffixes are used for round objects such as stones (fawú), breadfruit (mááy), eggs (hakúll).

Flat object suffixes are applied to objects such as leaves (éé), clothes (Mégaak: cloth), and mat (hááki).

Ordinals follow the pattern of sequential counting with the prefixes /ya-/, /yó-/, or /yé-/, followed by the base number, and the suffix /an-/ as seen in the following table.

1st	ya-ye-w-an
2nd	yó-ŕuw-ow-an
3rd	yé-yelú-w-an
4th	yó-f-ow-an
5th	yá-lim-ow-an
6th	yó-won-ow-an
7th	ya-féh-úw-an
8th	ya-wal-uw-an
9th	ya-ttiw-ow-an
10th	ya-hee-yik-an

The names of the days of the week for Tuesday through Saturday are the ordinals from 2nd through 6th without the suffix /an-/. Monday is sometimes referred to as ya-ye-w (1st) and Sunday ya-féh-úw (7th), but more commonly known as, hárin fáál (ending sacredness) and ránini pin (sacred day). However, Chuukese words for the names of the week are more often heard but with a Puluwat accent.

Monday	seŕin fáán
Tuesday	yóŕuuw
Wednesday	yewúnúngat
Thursday	yeŕuuwanú
Friday	yelimu
Saturday	yommol
