= Banaban language =

Extinct language spoken on Banaba

Banaban
- Native to: Kiribati
- Region: Banaba
- Ethnicity: Banaban people
- Extinct: after 1890s
- Language family: Austronesian: Malayo-Polynesian; Oceanic; Central–Eastern Oceanic; Micronesian; Banaban
- Writing system: Latin

Language codes
- ISO 639-3: None (mis)
- Glottolog: None
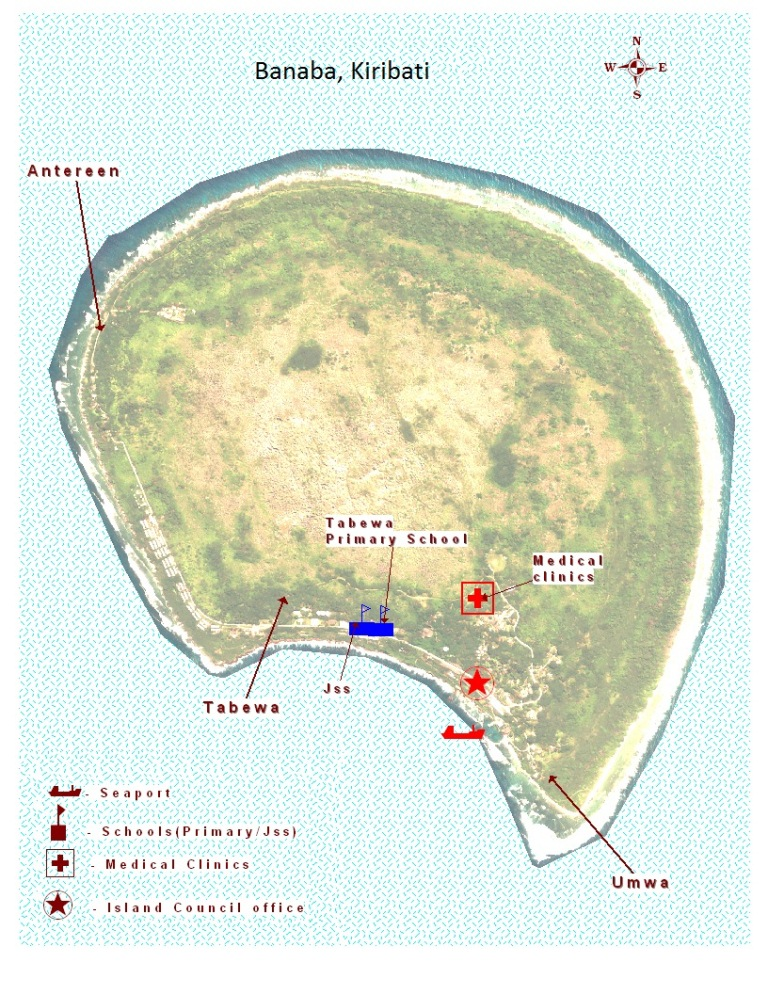
- Astronaut photo of Banaba

Banaban is a little-attested, extinct Micronesian language previously spoken on the island of Banaba.

Banaban was spoken by the Banaban people prior to the arrival of Captain Walkup of the American Mission Society in the 1890s. His attempts to promote Kiribati as opposed to Banaban because there existed a Kiribati translation of the Bible resulted in Banaban being replaced by Kiribati on the island. The Banaban people now speak a dialect of Kiribati with some words from the original Banaban language, according to Ethnologue.

It was mutually unintelligible with Kiribati.

== Remnants ==
Little sample texts remain from Banaban. The most notable possible remnant is a transcription of a lullaby from the Dalton Family collection, possibly written in Banaban according to Banaban Elders.

Te Karanga, also called the stick dance, is a Banaban war dance. The traditional chants from this dance, which is still practiced, use Banaban words.
