= Pááfang language =

Micronesian language

Pááfang
- Native to: Federated States of Micronesia
- Region: Caroline Islands
- Native speakers: (1,300 cited 1989 census)
- Language family: Austronesian: Malayo-Polynesian; Oceanic; Micronesian; Nuclear Micronesian; Chuukic; Pááfang

Language codes
- ISO 639-3: pfa
- Glottolog: paaf1237
- ELP: Pááfang
- Pááfang is classified as Severely Endangered by the UNESCO Atlas of the World's Languages in Danger.

Pááfang is a Micronesian language of the Federated States of Micronesia. It is spoken on the Hall Islands of Fananu, Murilo, Nomwin, and Ruo in Chuuk State.
