= Chuukic–Pohnpeic languages =

Language group

Chuukic–Pohnpeic
- Trukic–Ponapeic
- Geographic distribution: Micronesia
- Linguistic classification: Austronesian: Malayo-Polynesian; Oceanic; Micronesian; Micronesian Proper; Nuclear Micronesian; Chuukic–Pohnpeic
- Subdivisions: Chuukic; Pohnpeic

Language codes
- Glottolog: pona1247

The Chuukic–Pohnpeic or historically Trukic-Ponapeic languages are a family of Micronesian languages consisting of two dialect continua, Chuukic and Pohnpeic. They are the westernmost and historically most recent Micronesian languages.

== Composition ==
- Chuukic (Trukic)
- Pohnpeic (Ponapeic)

== Unique innovations ==
Chuukic-Pohnpeic has several unique innovations that separates it as a subgroup from the rest of Nuclear Micronesian. Among the most prominent are historical sound changes from Proto-Micronesian.

=== Historical sound changes ===
Chuukic-Pohnpeic languages share a number of historical sounds changes from Proto-Oceanic and Proto-Micronesian. Chuukic languages and Pohnpeic languages separately share later innovations.

Proto-Chuukic-Pohnpeic reflexes of Proto-Oceanic consonants
Proto-Oceanic	*mp	*mp,ŋp	*p	*m	*m,ŋm	*k	*ŋk	*ŋ	*y	*w	*t		*s,nj	*ns,j	*j	*nt,nd	*d,R	*l	*n	*ɲ
Proto-Micronesian	*p	*pʷ	*f	*m	*mʷ	*k	*x	*ŋ	*y	*w	*t	*T	*s	*S	*Z	*c	*r	*l	*n	*ɲ
Proto-Chuukic-Pohnpeic	*p	*pʷ	*f	*m	*mʷ	*k	*∅,r^{1}	*ŋ	*y	*w	*t	*j	*t	*t	∅	*c	*r	*l	*n	*ɲ

^{1} Before /a/.

== Reconstructed vocabulary ==
Reconstructed Proto-Chuukic-Pohnpeic Vocabulary
Proto-Chuukic-Pohnpeic	English gloss	Modern language reflexes
*awa	mouth	CAR aaw, PON aaw
*faa	brave, strong	CHK fa 'be brave, bold', MOK pa 'be talented'
*fawo-ni-pei	name of Pohnpei Island	CHK fóónupi, PON Pohnpei
*kurupʷu	small young coconut	CHK kurupʷ, PON kurupʷ 'immature coconut'
*pirafa	to steal	MRT púraf, PNG pirap
*waiya	journey, be foreign	CAR weey 'to travel', PON way 'be foreign, from abroad'
*woro-	throat, neck	CHK woro-mi 'to swallow', PON wɛrɛ 'his/her neck'
