= Mokilese language =

Micronesian language

Mokilese
- Mwoakilloa
- Native to: Micronesia
- Region: Mwoakilloa
- Native speakers: (1,500 cited 1979–2010)
- Language family: Austronesian: Malayo-Polynesian; Oceanic; Micronesian; Nuclear Micronesian; Chuukic–Pohnpeic; Pohnpeic; Mokilese
- Writing system: Latin script

Language codes
- ISO 639-3: mkj
- Glottolog: moki1238
- ELP: Mokilese
- Mokilese is classified as Critically Endangered by the UNESCO Atlas of the World's Languages in Danger.

Mokilese, also known as Mwoakilloan, Mwokilese, or Mwoakilese, is a Micronesian language originally spoken on Mwoakilloa, Federated States of Micronesia. Of the 1200 Mokilese speakers, only about 500 live on Mwoakilloa.

== Introduction ==
=== History ===
Mokilese originated from the Mokil (or Mwoakilloa) Atoll, but speakers have also migrated approximately 100 miles west, to the Pohnpei Islands, and parts of the United States. Mwoakilloa and Pohnpei are both geographically part of the Caroline Islands just above Papua New Guinea. Mwoakilloa is a district of the outlying islands of Pohnpei of the Federated States of Micronesia.

Before Western contact, Mokilese only had contact with its neighboring islands: Pohnpei, Pingelap, Kosrae, and the Marshall Islands. After Spanish explorers "rediscovered" Mokil Atoll, they colonized it in 1886 (Hezel, 1992). Shortly after they lost the Spanish-American War in 1898, they sold it to Germany (Encyclopædia Britannica, 2014). Later, in 1914, it was seized by Japan and heavily fortified during World War II, until Japan surrendered and passed it on to the United States in August 1945 (Hezel, 1992). Thereafter, it became a part of the UN trust territory under U.S. jurisdiction in 1947 until the trust territory dissolved in 1986 (Encyclopædia Britannica, 2014).

=== Population ===
Mokilese is both the name of the Mokil population and the language which they speak. It is currently spoken on Mokil Atoll, the Pohnpei Islands, and in some parts of the United States. There are only approximately 1,500 speakers of this language left. 1,050 of whom reside in Micronesia; a little over 900 in Pohnpei and less than 150 in Mokil Atoll. The other 450 speakers are scattered across the United States (Lewis, Simons, & Fennig, 2013). Although this language originated in Mokil Atoll, there are now only around 150 speakers who live in Mokil Atoll, while the rest live in diaspora communities―approximately 100 miles west―to Pohnpei, where they remain until this day (Rehg & Bender, 1990).

=== Classification ===
Mokilese is a Micronesian language, and therefore, a part of the Austronesian language family. Mokilese belongs to the Pohnpeic subgrouping, and is the sister language of Pingelapese and Pohnpeian. Mokilese shares approximately 79% lexical similarity with Pingelapese, and 75% with Pohnapeian (Lewis, Simons, & Fennig, 2013).

== Phonology ==
=== Consonants ===
Mokilese has the following simple consonant phonemes:

Consonants in Mokilese
	Labial		Alveolar	Palatal	Velar
	Bilabial	Labio-velar	Alveolar	Palatal	Velar
Plosive	p ⟨p⟩	pʷˠ ⟨pw⟩	d ⟨d⟩	ɟ ⟨j⟩	k ⟨k⟩
Nasal	m ⟨m⟩	mʷˠ ⟨mw⟩	n ⟨n⟩		ŋ ⟨ng⟩
Fricative			s ⟨s⟩		
Approximant			l ⟨l⟩		
Trill			r ⟨r⟩		

/ɟ/ may also be realized as a fricative [ʝ] in certain positions, and may also be heard as a palatal affricate [ɟ͡ʝ] in free variation.

In addition Mokilese contrasts between simple and geminate consonants and each consonant above has a geminate pair. For example likkoau (clothes) contrasts with likoau (chapped). Geminate consonants only occur between vowels. Geminate ⟨pw⟩, ⟨mw⟩, and ⟨ng⟩ are written ⟨pww⟩, ⟨mww⟩, and ⟨ngg⟩, respectively.

=== Vowels ===
Mokilese has 7 simple phonemic vowels distinguishing between short and long varieties of each, except no minimal pairs exist between /e/ and /eː/, notably.

Vowels in Mokilese
	Front		Back	
Close	i	iː	u	uː
Close-mid	e	eː	o	oː
Open-mid	ɛ	ɛː	ɔ	ɔː
Open	a		aː	

Although distinguished in the phonology, /e/ and /ɛ/ are not distinguished in Mokilese orthography. Both are written ⟨e⟩.

=== Syllable structure ===
Mokilese words can begin and end with both vowels and consonants. However, this does not mean that there are no rules at all. Mokilese syllables still maintain a set of rules as explained by Harrison and Albert (1976):

1. In Mokilese, a sequence of consonants within a word does not normally belong to the same syllable, because it is difficult to produce a sequence like CCV. If two consonants come together within a word, place a syllable boundary between them. (Remember that ng is a single consonant even though it is written with two letters.)
  angkoa 'anchor' ang-koa
  dipkelkel 'to stumble' dip-kel-kel
  janjal 'clear' jan-jal
2. If a single consonant occurs between two vowels within a word, place a syllable boundary before the consonant.
  dangahnga 'lazy' da-ngah-nga
  widek 'to pour' wi-dek
  pere 'room' pe-re
3. If two vowels come together within a word, place a syllable boundary between them.
  duhrion 'kind of tree' duh-ri-on
  injinjued 'sad' in-jin-ju-ed
  kia 'to not want' ki-a

=== Historical sound changes ===
Mokilese reflexes of Proto Oceanic consonants
Proto Oceanic	*mp	*mp,ŋp	*p	*m	*m,ŋm	*k	*ŋk	*ŋ	*y	*w	*t		*s,nj	*ns,j	*j	*nt,nd	*d,R	*l	*n	*ɲ
Proto Micronesian	*p	*pʷ	*f	*m	*mʷ	*k	*x	*ŋ	*y	*w	*t	*T	*s	*S	*Z	*c	*r	*l	*n	*ɲ
Proto Chuukic–Pohnpeic	*p	*pʷ	*f	*m	*mʷ	*k	*∅,r (Note: Before /a/.)	*ŋ	*y	*w	*t	*j	*t	*t	∅	*c	*r	*l	*n	*ɲ
Proto-Pohnpeic	*p (Note: In the Pohnpeic languages, geminate obstruents are realized as homorganic nasal-obstruent clusters.)	*pʷ	*p, ∅ (Note: Often before /i/.)	*m	*mʷ	*k	*∅,r	*ŋ	*y	*w	*j,∅{_i,u,e (Note: The reflex is *∅ sporadically before PMc *e.)}	*j	*t	*t	∅	* c	*r	*l	*n	*∅,n{high V_}
Mokilese	p	pʷ	p, ∅	m	mʷ	k	∅,r	ŋ	∅,y	w	j,∅{_i,u,e}	j	t̻	t̻	∅	s	r	l	n	∅,n{high V_}

== Grammar ==
=== Basic word order ===
The basic word order for Mokilese is Subject–Verb–Object (Harrison & Albert, 1976).

ex. Woal lapp-o loakjid phon woss-o. Man old-that to fish on reef-that That old man is fishing on the reef.

This example shows the subject (man) comes first, then the verb (to fish), and lastly, the object (reef).

=== Reduplication ===
There are many forms of reduplication in Mokilese. The most common reduplication form is a reduplication of the first CVC of a word.

- poadok – to plant something
  - poadpoadok – to be planting something
- loang – fly
  - loangloang – full of flies

Next, there is the CVː reduplication form. This is the reduplication of the first CV of a word and lengthening of the vowel (represented by ⟨h⟩).

- wia – to do
  - wihwi'a – to be doing
- no – a wave
  - nohno – many waves

Another reduplication form Mokilese has is VCC. When reduplicating VC, the consonant is also geminated.

- oapi – to pull something
  - oappoap – to pull
- ir – to string
  - irrir – to be stringing

There is also the CV reduplication, which reduplicates the first CV of a word.

- mwahl – bad
  - mwamwahl – to treat badly
- doa – to sew something
  - doadoa – to sew

Lastly, there is also the -CVC reduplication form. This form reduplicates the last CVC of a word rather than the first.

- pwirej – dirt
  - pwirejrej – dirty
- sakai – rock
  - sakaikai – rocky

=== Numerals ===
Mokilese has a base 10 counting system. Rather than having just one set of numbers, Mokilese has four sets, each used to count different things. Each number consists of a numeral prefix and a numeral classifier. Most of the numeral prefixes are similar across the four different sets, and it is the general classifier that distinguishes one set from another. The four general classifiers are –w, –men, –pas, and –kij, as shown in the chart below.

	-w	-men	-pas	-kij
One	e-w	e-men	e-pas	e-kif
Two	ria-w	roah-men	rah-pas	riah-kij
Three	jilu-w	jil-men	jil-pas	jil-kij
Four	pah-w	pah-men	pah-pas	pah-kij
Five	limoa-w	lim-men	lim-pas	lim-kij
Six	wono-w	won-men	won-pas	won-kij
Seven	iju-w	ij-men	ij-pas	ij-kij
Eight	walu-w	wal-men	wal-pas	wal-lij
Nine	duoa-w	doh-man	doh-pas	doh-kij

–w is a general classifier; it is used to count numbers and describe other objects that are not covered by the other number classifiers.

- puk riaw – two books

-men describes animate nouns such as people, bird, animal, fish, etc.

- woal roahmen – two men

-pas is used to describe long objects like pencil, canoe, songs, stories, road, etc.

- suhkoa rahpas – two trees

-kij is for describing things that have parts and pieces such as slices of bread, sheets of paper, fragment of a mirror, etc.

- wija ijkij – seven pieces of land

Mokilese's numerals can also reach up to the billions. However, most of the higher numerals are rarely used.

== Vocabulary ==
=== Indigenous vocabulary ===
- soa – leaf
- ros – dark
- ringoaingoai – thin
- pik – sand
- war – canoe
- doahk – dog
- ad – name

=== Loanwords ===
Mokilese has borrowed numerous words from languages of foreigners who traveled into Micronesia, as well as from other Micronesian languages. Some Micronesian languages that influenced Mokilese were Pohnpeian, Marshallese, Pingelapese, and Kusaiean (Rehg & Bender, 1990). The reason why Mokilese borrowed words from these languages was because they had lived in close contact with the people of these islands for many years. Because of how this borrowing occurred, it is hard to tell exactly when the words were borrowed, especially since there were hardly any documentations from back then. On top of that, not all loanwords are easy to identify because these languages are all, more or less, closely related to Mokilese. Sheldon P. Harrison (1976) believed there to be more loanwords from other Micronesian languages, but "it is difficult to tell exactly how many because of the problems in distinguishing such borrowings from native Mokilese words." With that said, a few loanwords from these places have been identified.

Words derived from Pohnpeian:

- indan – popular
- pohnkahke – lazy
- rahnmwahu – greetings
- wahnpoaroan – minister

Words derived from Marshallese:

- moado – skilled navigator
- mej – exhausted

Word derived from Marshallese:

- doa – sugar cane

Mokilese also borrowed words from foreign languages such as German, Spanish, Japanese, and English. These borrowings occurred due to colonization. The first of these languages to come in contact with Mokilese was Spanish, which occurred in the 16th century, when Spanish explorers discovered Micronesia (Hezel, 1992). Then they colonized the Mokil Atoll in 1886. Shortly after, Spain sold the island to Germany after they lost the Spanish–American War in 1898 (Encyclopædia Britannica, 2014). Later, in 1914, the island was seized by Japan in 1919, and heavily fortified during World War II, until they surrendered and passed it on to United States in August 1945 (Hezel, 1992). Thereafter, it became part of a UN trust territory under U.S. jurisdiction in 1947 until the trust territory dissolved in 1986 (Encyclopædia Britannica, 2014). All this outside contact introduced many loanwords to Mokilese, although there are only a few for Spanish and German because their contact durations were shorter.

Word derived from Spanish:

- pwohla (ball), compare with pelota
- mihsa (mass), compare with masa

Word derived from German:

- dois (Germany), compare with Deutsch
- mahk (mark/German money), compare with Mark

Word derived from Japanese:

- sasimi (raw fish), from 刺身 (sashimi)
- middo (catcher's mitt), from ミット (mitto)
- aramaki (belly band), from 腹巻き (haramaki)
- ansu (apricot tree), from 杏子 (anzu)
- ohdai (bandage), from 包帯 (hōtai)
- jidohsa (car), from じどうしゃ (jidosha)
- jikeng (test), from 試験 (shiken)
- pehnggohsi (defender), from 弁護士 (bengoshi)

Word derived from English (before WWII):

- sehpil (table)
- jip (ship)
- kepden (captain)
- ama (hammer)
- pilahwa (flour, bread)
- roam (rum)
- ju (shoe)
- ehl (Hell)
- krihn (green)
- inj (inch)
- dainj (dance)

Word derived from English (after WWII):

- delpwohn (telephone)
- kias (gasoline)
- klohraks (bleach)
- kirajiweid (graduate)
- koangkiris (congress)

== Endangerment ==
=== Vitality ===
Mokilese is an endangered language. It is only spoken at home, and the language acquisition is getting worse with each generation. This is because the younger generations are not fluent speakers, they prefer learning Pohnpeian and English instead, so only the elders and adults are actually fluent (Poll, 2013). This is just for the Mokilese speakers in Pohnpei and Mokil Atoll; the speakers in the U.S. are all old and have no domains of use, so when they die, there will be no more speakers in the United States (Lewis, Simons, & Fennig, 2013). Mokilese does not have government recognition and there are no schools that teaches the language (Poll, 2013).

=== Materials ===
Mokilese is endangered and lacks extensive documentation. The complete published resources are a Mokilese-English Dictionary (Harrison & Albert, 1977) and a Mokilese Reference Grammar (Harrison & Albert, 1976). However these resources are fairly outdated since they were written in the 1960s and the language is changing rapidly. Other physical materials in Mokilese are books of chants, songs, accounts and tales of Mokil Atoll, which are few. There is also one short interview video, and a couple of war dance videos on YouTube. However, there are no websites, TV shows, or radio stations in their language.
