= Namonuito language =

Micronesian language

Namonuito
- Native to: Caroline Islands
- Region: Namonuito Atoll
- Native speakers: (940 cited 1989 census)
- Language family: Austronesian: Malayo-Polynesian; Oceanic; Micronesian; Nuclear Micronesian; Chuukic; Tanapag; Namonuito

Language codes
- ISO 639-3: nmt
- Glottolog: namo1247
- ELP: Namonuito
- Namonuito is classified as Severely Endangered by the UNESCO Atlas of the World's Languages in Danger.

Namonuito is a Micronesian language of the Federated States of Micronesia. It is spoken on Namonuito Atoll.

== Phonology ==
=== Consonants ===
IPA chart Namonuito consonants
	Labial		Dental-Alveolar		Palatal		Velar	
Nasal		m		n				ŋ
Plosive	p	b	t	d	c	ɟ	k	ɡ
Fricative	f	v	s				x	ɣ
Continuant		w		r		j		
