= Proto-Micronesian language =

Reconstructed ancestor of the Micronesian languages

Proto-Micronesian
- PMc
- Reconstruction of: Micronesian languages
- Era: around 2000 BP
- Reconstructed ancestors: Proto-Austronesian: Proto-Malayo-Polynesian; Proto-Oceanic
- Lower-order reconstructions: Proto-Chuukic

Proto-Micronesian (abbreviated as PMc) is the reconstructed ancestor of the Micronesian languages. It belongs to the Oceanic branch of the Austronesian languages.

It was first reconstructed in detail by Byron W. Bender in 2003.

== Descendants ==
Proto-Micronesian is the ancestor of almost all of the languages of Micronesia, except for Chamorro, Palauan, Yapese, and the two Polynesian languages of Nukuoro and Kapingamarangi, which are only distantly related to Proto-Micronesian.

With regards to subgrouping by Jackson (1986), it was thought that Nauruan fell outside the Nuclear Micronesian group. However, Hughes (2020) argues instead for the classification of Nauruan as a Nuclear Micronesian language, either as a primary branch of Micronesian, a subgrouping with Kosraean, or belonging within Central Micronesian.

== Phonology ==
The consonants of Proto-Micronesian, according to Jackson, are:

Consonants
	Labiovelar	Bilabial	Dental	Alveolar	Palatal	Velar
Stop	*pʷ	*p	*t		*c	*k
Nasal	*mʷ	*m	*n		*ɲ	*ŋ
Fricative		*f	*S	*s	*Z	*x
Affricate			*T			
Approximant	*w			*l	*j	

The values of *S, *T, and *Z are unknown, the latter only occurring in two words: *kiaZo "outrigger boom" and *laZe "kind of coral".

The vowels of Proto-Micronesian, according to Jackson and Hughes, are:

Vowels
	Front	Back
Close	*i	*u
Close-mid	*e	*o
Open	*a	

== Example sentence ==
From Jackson (1986, 205), modified to fit Bender (2003)'s orthography:

*Mʷaane na aramata=ni sakau.
man that person.GEN reef-island
'That man (is) of a reef island.'
