= Chuukic languages =

Subgroup of the Chuukic–Pohnpeic family of the Austronesian language family

Chuukic
- Trukic
- Geographic distribution: Micronesia
- Linguistic classification: Austronesian: Malayo-Polynesian; Oceanic; Micronesian; Micronesian Proper; Nuclear Micronesian; Chuukic–Pohnpeic; Chuukic
- Proto-language: Proto-Chuukic

Language codes
- Glottolog: truk1243
- Map of the Micronesian languages; Chuukic languages are shaded in red.

Chuukic (/ˈtʃuːkɪk/), historically also rendered as Trukic (/ˈtruːkɪk/), is a subgroup of the Chuukic–Pohnpeic family of the Austronesian language family. The languages are primarily spoken in Chuuk State and Yap State of the Federated States of Micronesia, as well as in the outer islands of Palau. The Carolinians of the Commonwealth of the Northern Mariana Islands also speak their own language distinct from the historically native Chamorro people.

== Languages ==
- Sonsorol and Tobian (close enough to each other to often be considered dialects)
- Chuukese
- Woleaian and Ulithian
- Puluwatese, Namonuito, and Tanapag
- Carolinian
- Satawalese and Mortlockese (closely related)
- Pááfang
- Mapia (extinct)

== Phonology ==
Proto-Chuukic reflexes of Proto-Oceanic consonants
Proto-Oceanic	*mp	*mp,ŋp	*p	*m	*m,ŋm	*k	*ŋk	*ŋ	*y	*w	*t		*s,nj	*ns,j	*j	*nt,nd	*d,R	*l	*n	*ɲ
Proto-Micronesian	*p	*pʷ	*f	*m	*mʷ	*k	*x	*ŋ	*y	*w	*t	*T	*s	*S	*Z	*c	*r	*l	*n	*ɲ
Proto-Chuukic-Pohnpeic	*p	*pʷ	*f	*m	*mʷ	*k	*∅,r^{1}	*ŋ	*y	*w	*t	*T	*t	*t	∅	*c	*r	*l	*n	*ɲ
Proto-Chuukic	*p	*pʷ	*f	*m	*mʷ	*k	*∅	*ŋ	*y	*w	*t	*T	*d	*d	∅	*c	*r	*l	*n	*ɲ

^{1} before /a/
