= Chuukese language =

Austronesian language spoken on the Chuuk islands in Micronesia

Chuukese
- Trukese
- Chuuk
- Native to: Federated States of Micronesia
- Region: Chuuk
- Ethnicity: Chuukese
- Native speakers: (51,330 cited 2000 census)
- Language family: Austronesian: Malayo-Polynesian; Oceanic; Micronesian; Nuclear Micronesian; Chuukic–Pohnpeic; Chuukic; Chuukese
- Early forms: Proto-Austronesian: Proto-Malayo-Polynesian; Proto-Oceanic; Proto-Micronesian; Proto-Nuclear Micronesian; Proto-Nuclear Polynesian; Proto-Chuukic–Pohnpeic; Proto-Chuukic; Old Chuukese
- Writing system: Latin script

Official status
- Official language in: Federated States of Micronesia

Language codes
- ISO 639-2: chk
- ISO 639-3: chk
- Glottolog: chuu1238

Chuukese (/tʃuːˈkiːz/), also rendered Trukese (/trʌˈkiːz/), is a Chuukic language of the Austronesian language family spoken primarily on the islands of Chuuk in the Caroline Islands in Micronesia. There are communities of speakers on Pohnpei, Guam, and in Hawaii. Estimates show that there are about 45,900 speakers in Micronesia. According to the 2017–2021 American Community Survey conducted by the U.S. Census Bureau, approximately 14,700 people aged five and older speak Chuukese at home in the United States.

== Classification ==
Chuukese is an Austronesian language of the Micronesian subbranch. It is one of the dialects making up the Chuukic subgroup of Micronesian languages, together with its close relatives like Woleaian and Carolinian.

== Phonology ==
Chuukese has the unusual feature of permitting word-initial geminate (double) consonants. The common ancestor of Western Micronesian languages is believed to have had this feature, but most of its modern descendants have lost it.

Truk and Chuuk only differ in orthography, with both older ⟨tr⟩ and current ⟨ch⟩ representing the sound [ʈʂ].

Chuukese consonants
		Labial		Alveolar	Postalveolar/ Palatal	Velar
		plain	lab.	Alveolar	Postalveolar/ Palatal	Velar
Nasal	plain	m	mʷ	n		ŋ
Nasal	tense	mː	mːʷ			ŋː
Plosive/Affricate		p	pʷ	t	ʈʂ	k
Fricative	plain	f		s		
Fricative	tense	fː		sː		
Trill				r		
Approximant		w		l	j	

Consonants are doubled in Chuuk when they have a voiceless sound. Some consonant combinations are frequently denasalized between vowels when doubled.

Chuukese vowels
	Front	Central	Back
High	i	ɨ	u
Mid	e	ʌ	o
Low	æ	a	ɒ

/ɨ/ can be heard as either central [ɨ] or back [ɯ].

== Orthography ==
Chuukese is one of the few languages allowing for word initial double consonants:

Chuukese spelling
a	á	e	é	i	o	ó	u	ú	f	ff	s	ss	k	kk	m	mm	mw	mmw	n	ng	nng	p	pp	pw	ppw	r	ch	t	tt	w	y
IPA
ɐ	a	e	ə	i	o	ɑ	u	ɨ	f	fː	s	sː	k	kː	m	mː	mˠ	mˠː	nn̩	ŋ	ŋː	p	pː	p~b	pː	r	tʂ	t̪	t̪ː	w	j
