= Micronesian languages =

Oceanic language family of Micronesia

Micronesian
- Geographic distribution: Micronesia
- Linguistic classification: Austronesian: Malayo-Polynesian; Oceanic; Central–Eastern Oceanic; Micronesian
- Proto-language: Proto-Micronesian
- Subdivisions: Kosraean; Nauruan; Central Micronesian

Language codes
- Glottolog: micr1243
- Micronesian

The Micronesian Languages

The Micronesian languages form a family of Oceanic languages. The twenty languages are known for their lack of plain labial consonant and have instead two series, palatalized and labio-velarized labials, similar to the related New Caledonian languages.

== Languages ==
According to Jackson (1983, 1986) the languages group as follows:

- Micronesian family
  - Nauruan
  - Nuclear Micronesian family
    - Kosraean
    - Central Micronesian family
      - Gilbertese
      - Western Micronesian family
        - Marshallese
        - Chuukic-Pohnpeic family
          - Chuukic (Chuukic)
          - Pohnpeic (Ponapeic)

The family appears to have originated in the east, likely on Kosrae, and spread westwards. Kosrae appears to have been settled from the south, in the region of Malaita (Solomon Islands) or in northern Vanuatu.

Kevin Hughes (2020) revises Jackson's classification, especially with regard to the position of Nauruan, who states that there is no compelling argument from classifying Nauruan apart from other Micronesian languages. He proposes three hypotheses: (1) Nauruan is a primary branch alongside Kosraean, (2) Kosraean and Nauruan form a subgroup, and (3) Nauruan is a primary branch of the Central Micronesian family.

More recently, Lev Blumenfield argued that Micronesian is a linkage derived from a near-simultaneous settlement of Micronesia around two thousand years ago.

== External classification ==
John Lynch (2003) tentatively proposes that the Micronesian languages may form a subclade within the Southern Oceanic languages, and specifically a sister clade to the Kanak languages within the latter family. He notes the following features that the Micronesian and Loyalties languages share in common, among other features:

- Palatalized reflexes of the Proto-Oceanic bilabial series
- Loss of Proto-Oceanic *p before round vowels
- Unconditioned loss of Proto-Oceanic *y and (ungeminated) *q

However, he does not state that this relationship is certain or even likely. He merely states "that this is something that could well be further investigated, even if only to confirm that Micronesian languages did not originate in the Loyalties."
