= Inlay (disambiguation) =

Inlay is a decorative technique whereby different materials are inserted to depressions in a base object.

It may also refer to:

- Boulle work, inlay on wood, metal and furniture by André-Charles Boulle
- Inlay (guitar), inlays on guitars and similar music instruments
- Inlays and onlays in dentistry, which are indirect fixed restorations
