= Roositud =

Estonian knitting technique

Roositud (Estonian: roositud, roosimine or vāljaõmmeldud), also known as roosimine, Estonian inlay, or knitweaving, is a inlay knitting technique originating from the Estonian knitting tradition, specifically from the southern parts of western Estonia, and the east and north parts of Mulgimaa. It is traditionally only found on socks, stockings, and gloves. Gloves with roositud inlays are called roositud kindad (literally, rose-patterned gloves). Alongside lace knitting, travelling stitches, and stranded colourwork, it was one of the most common design features found in extant samples of 19th and 20th century Estonian mittens in the Estonian National Museum.

Unlike other forms of colourwork, which rely on different stitches being knit in different colours, only one colour is knit per round or row in the roositud technique. To produce pre-charted motifs, lengths of the contrasting colour are carried around the wrong (or back) of the knitted round, then pulled between the working stitches and draped across the front (or visible) side of the work. The finished design resembles embroidery. There exist several samples of historic Estonian mittens with a similar appearance that were embroidered, likely in an attempt to mimic the appearance of roositud.

Different regions of Estonia had their own ways of traditionally using roositud inlays. Most common were white backgrounds. In Tõstamaa and Audru, knitters would make white gloves and add inlays to the backs of the hands, and sometimes the fingers. In Viljandimaa and Pärnumaa, roositude was used to create intrucate patterns of red or blue stars or diamonds along the lower leg and foot of white stockings. These designs were broken off at the heel. Roositud inlays on non-white backgrounds were relatively uncommon, with the practice mostly being confined to regions of Mulgimaa. On the island of Ruhnu, where the people were influenced by Swedish and German cultures, knitters would add red and white roositud inlays to blue stockings.
