= Inlay =

Artistic technique

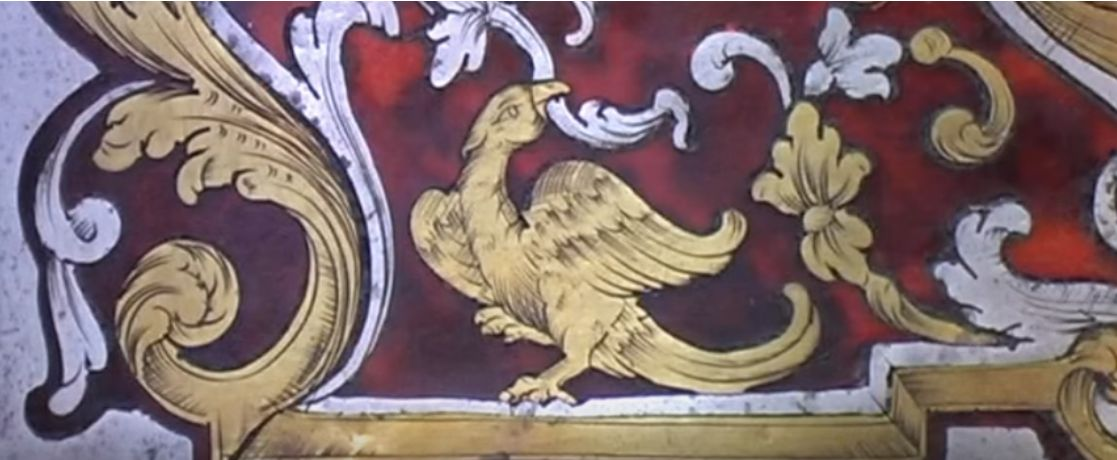
Example of Boulle work inlay using tortoiseshell in mottled red, brass and pewter

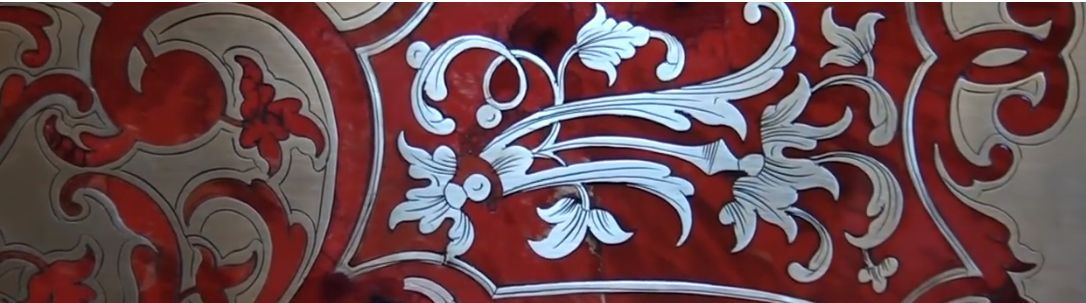
Boulle work showing the use of pewter (center) and the 'depth' given by tortoiseshell in the background. Brass inlay is on the right and left.

Inlay covers a range of techniques in sculpture and the decorative arts for inserting pieces of contrasting, often colored materials into depressions in a base object to form ornament or pictures that normally are flush with the matrix. A great range of materials has been used both for the base or matrix and for the inlays inserted into it. Inlay is commonly used in the production of decorative furniture, where pieces of colored wood, precious metals or even diamonds are inserted into the surface of the carcass using various matrices including clear coats and varnishes. Lutherie inlays are frequently used as decoration and marking on musical instruments, particularly the smaller strings.

Perhaps the most famous example of furniture inlay is that of André-Charles Boulle (1642–1732) which is known as Boulle work and evolved in part from inlay produced in Italy during the late 15th century at the studiolo for Federico da Montefeltro in his Ducal Palace at Urbino, in which trompe-l'œil shelving seems to carry books, papers, curios and mathematical instruments, in eye-deceiving perspective. The similar private study made for him at Gubbio is now in the Metropolitan Museum of Art.

== Inlay in wood ==
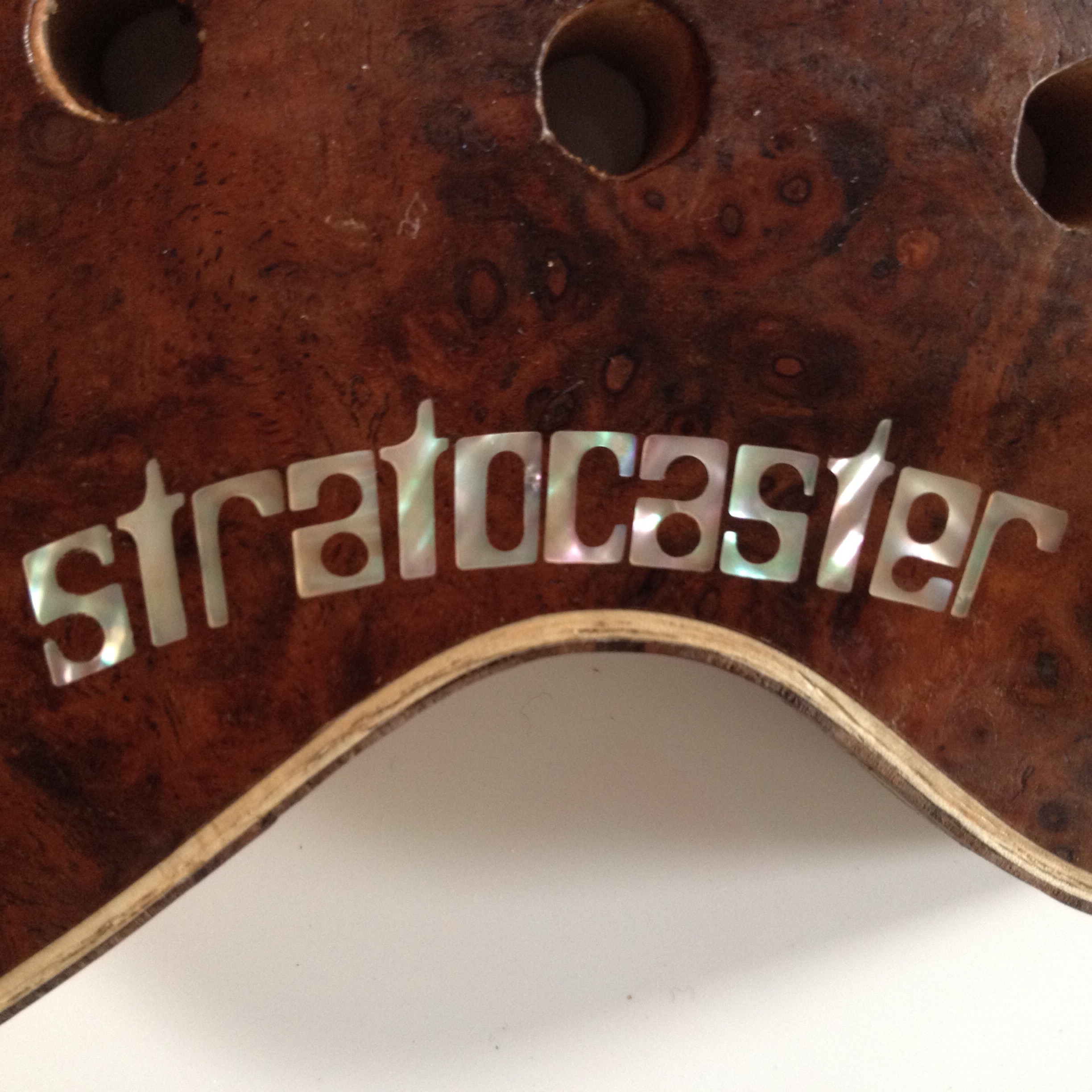
Mother of pearl inlay into walnut burl on a customised Fender Stratocaster.

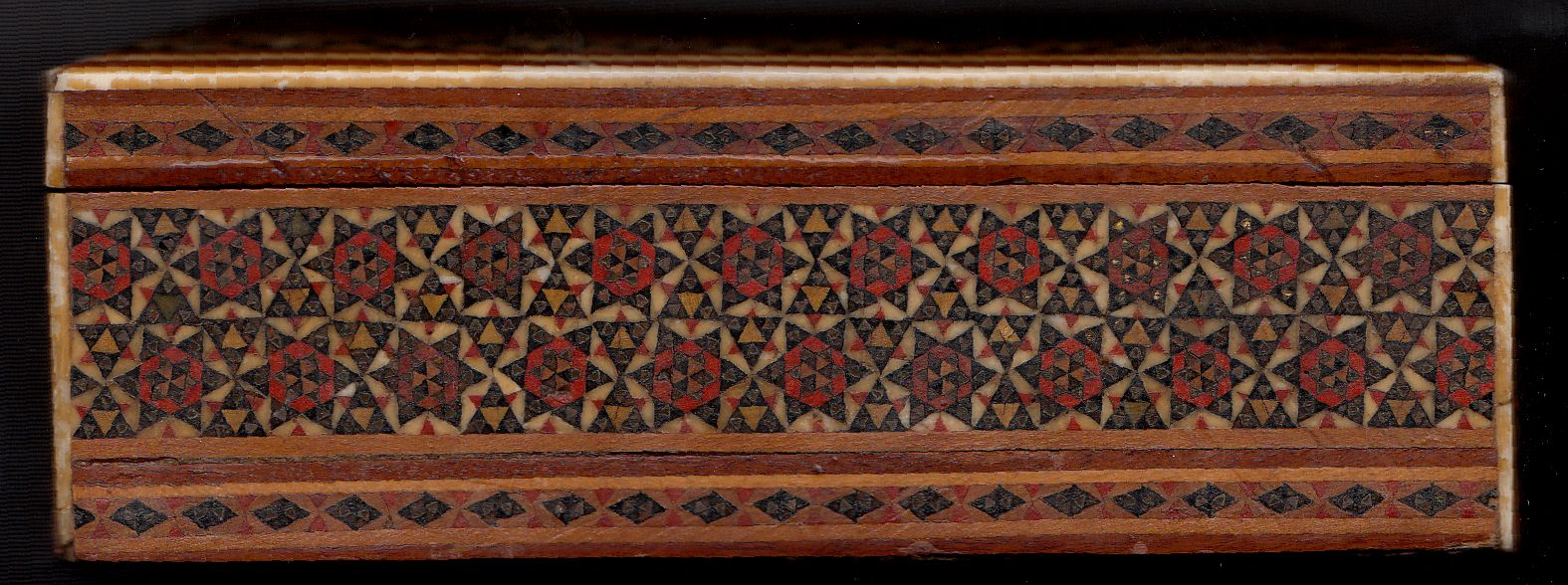
Inlay (ivory, red sandalwood, copper) on wooden casket

In a wood matrix, inlays commonly use wood veneers, but other materials like shells, mother-of-pearl, horn or ivory may also be used. Pietre dure, or coloured stones inlaid in white or black marbles, and inlays of precious metals in a base metal matrix, are other forms of inlay. Master craftspeople who make custom knives continue a tradition of ancient techniques of inlaying precious metals; additionally, many new techniques which use contemporary tools have also been developed and utilized as well by artisans.

Intarsia inlay in wood furniture differs from marquetry, a similar technique that largely replaced it in high-style European furniture during the 17th century, in that marquetry is an assembly of veneers applied over the entire surface of an object, whereas inlay consists of small pieces inserted on the bed of cut spaces in the base material, of which most remains visible.

== Inlay on metals ==
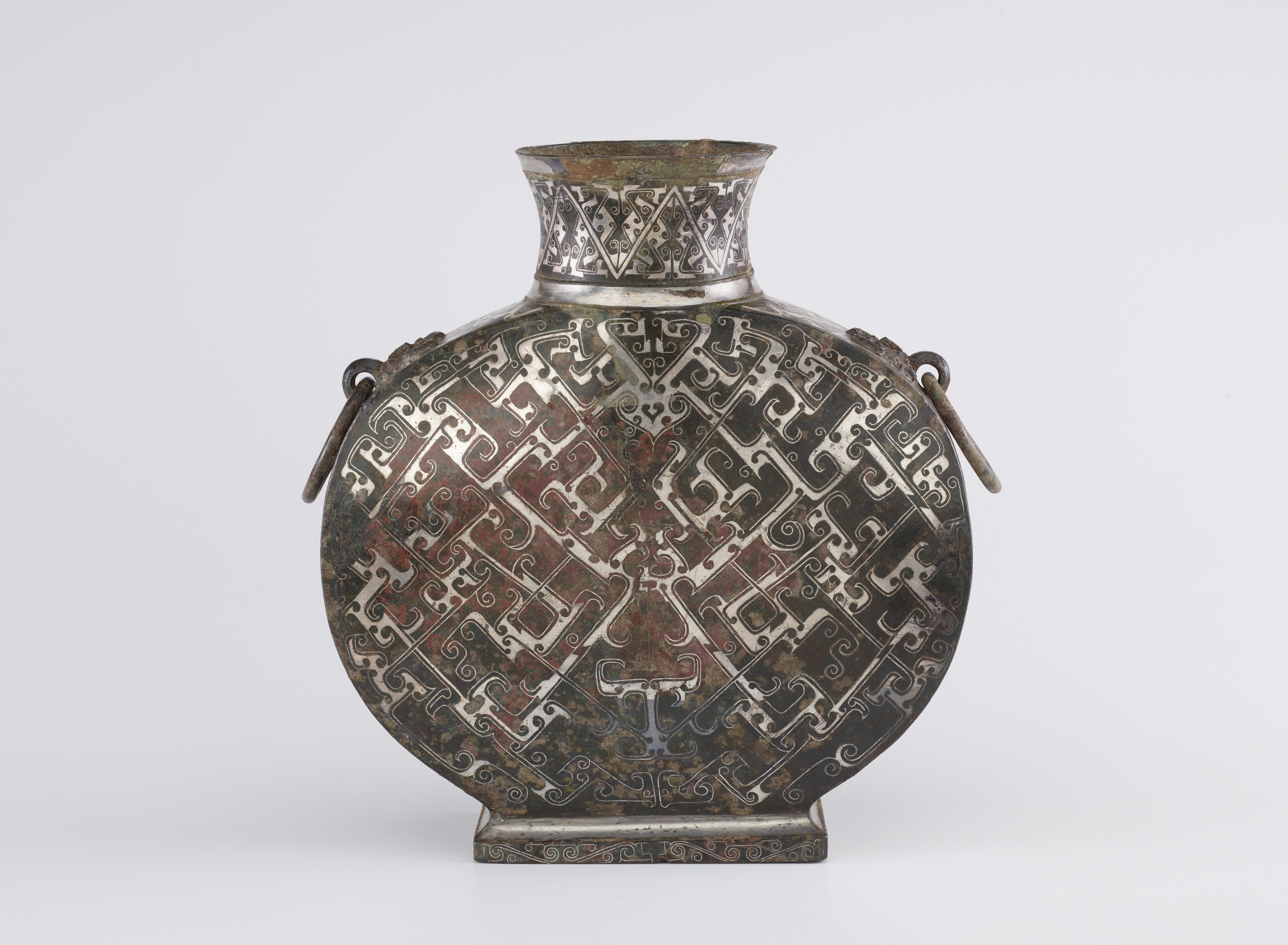
Bronze inlaid with silver: ceremonial flask, China, Warring States period, 3rd century BC

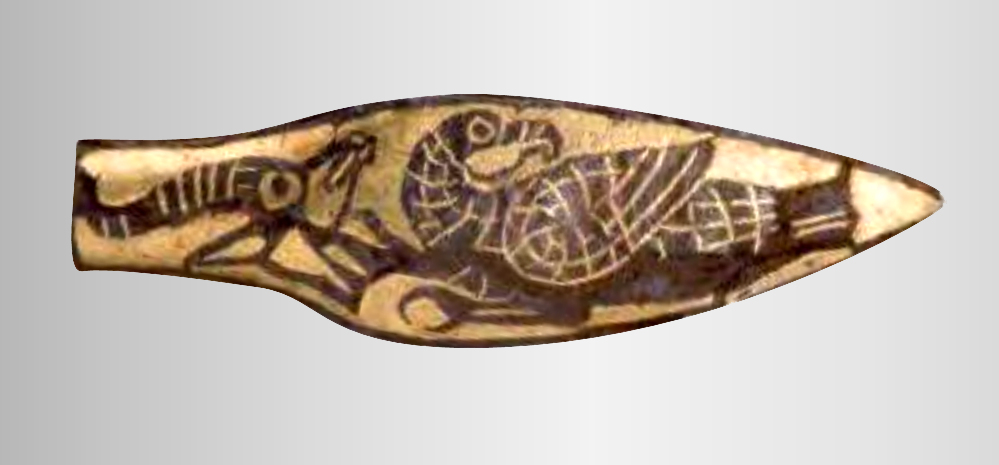
Arrowhead with gold inlays, Arzhan-2, 7th century BCE

The history of inlay is very old but it is still evolving alongside new technologies and new materials being discovered today. The technique of metal in metal inlay was sophisticated and accomplished in ancient China as shown in examples of vessels decorated with precious metals, including this ding vessel (pictured) with gold and silver inlay from the Warring States period (403–221 BC).

The French cabinet maker André-Charles Boulle (1642–1732) specialized in furniture using inlays or metal and either wood or tortoiseshell together, the latter acting as the background. This type of inlay is known as "Boulle work".

After learning the skill of smithing from the Navaho in 1872, the Zuni silversmiths cut small chips from crystals and gemstones, pearl shell and coral, to make inlay designs in a base of silver.

In 1990, Vivienne Westwood created a collection inspired by Boulle inlay.

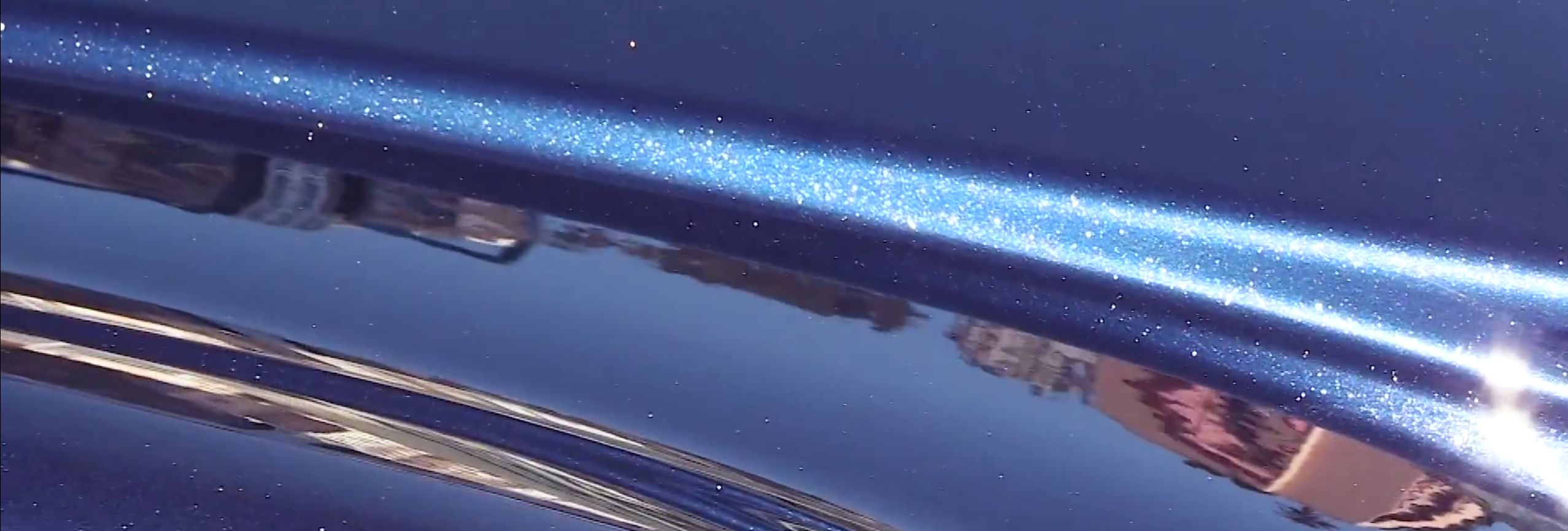
Sun King Diamond Coating by Jean Boulle Luxury on a Bentley Azure in Monaco

In 2016, a subsidiary company of Jean-Raymond Boulle discovered and has filed a patent for a new type of diamond inlay in keeping with Boulle work, subsequently produced by AkzoNobel for application on cars, planes and yachts.

== Inlay in stone ==
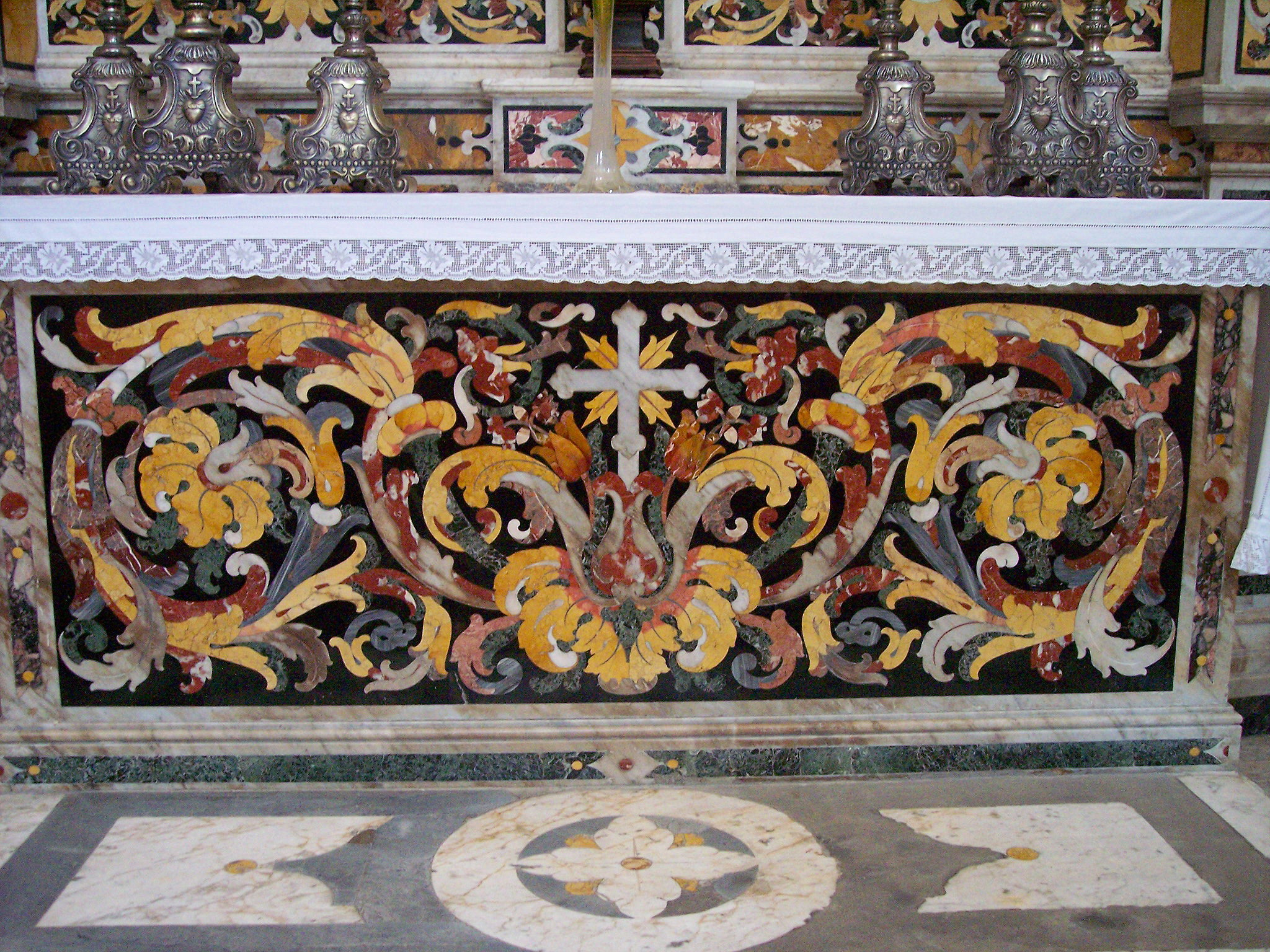
Cathedral Virgin Mary: inlays in contrasting colours of stones in pietra dura

The natives of Kerma (c. 2500 BCE – c. 1500 BCE) developed techniques for architectural inlays and glazed quartzite. Pietra dura is the usual term in Europe for detailed inlays in contrasting colours of stones, including many semi-precious types; parchin kari is an Indian term. Pietra dura developed from the Roman opus sectile, which was typically used on a larger scale, especially in floors. Cosmatesque work on walls and floors, and smaller objects, was a medieval intermediate stage, continuing ancient opus alexandrinum.

Inlaid artifacts have come down to us from the Ancient Mayan civilization, among them, jade, mother of pearl and onyx inlaid into stone during the era that arts reached a peak during the seven centuries from 200 to 900 AD.

Angie Reano Owen, a Kewa Pueblo artist from New Mexico, revived prehistoric Hohokam and Anasazi traditional designs in the 1970s with a new technique to inlay stone and shell mosaic jewelry. Her work has been collected by the Museum of Fine Arts Boston, the National Museum of the American Indian and the American Museum of Natural History.

== Inlay on fabrics ==
Vivienne Westwood created her Portrait Collection based on the furniture of André-Charles Boulle.

== Inlay in painting ==
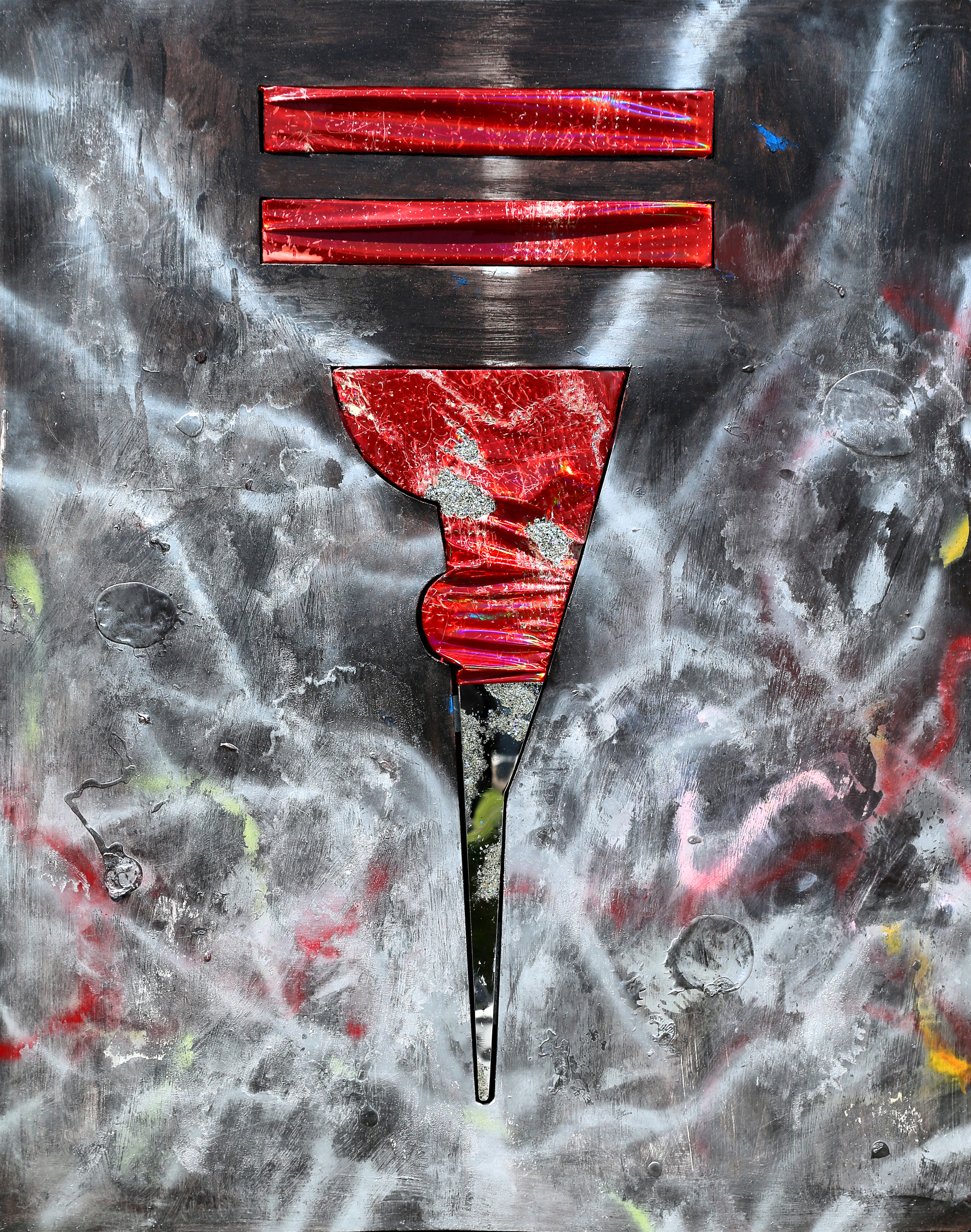
Kaloust Guedel, Inlay-1, 60"x48", 2022

Kaloust Guedel introduced the inlay technique into contemporary painting, articulating it as a philosophical construct through which material, form, and meaning are interrogated.

== Inlay in knitting ==
Roositud is an inlay technique found in Estonian knitting.

== Gallery ==
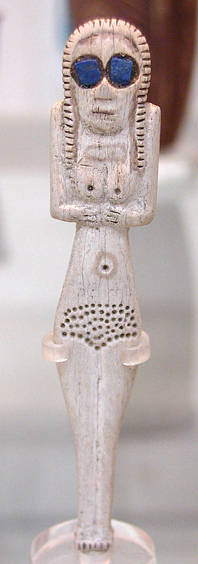
Pre-Dynastic Egyptian bone figure with eyes inlaid in lapis lazuli; inlaid eyes are found in sculptures from many periods

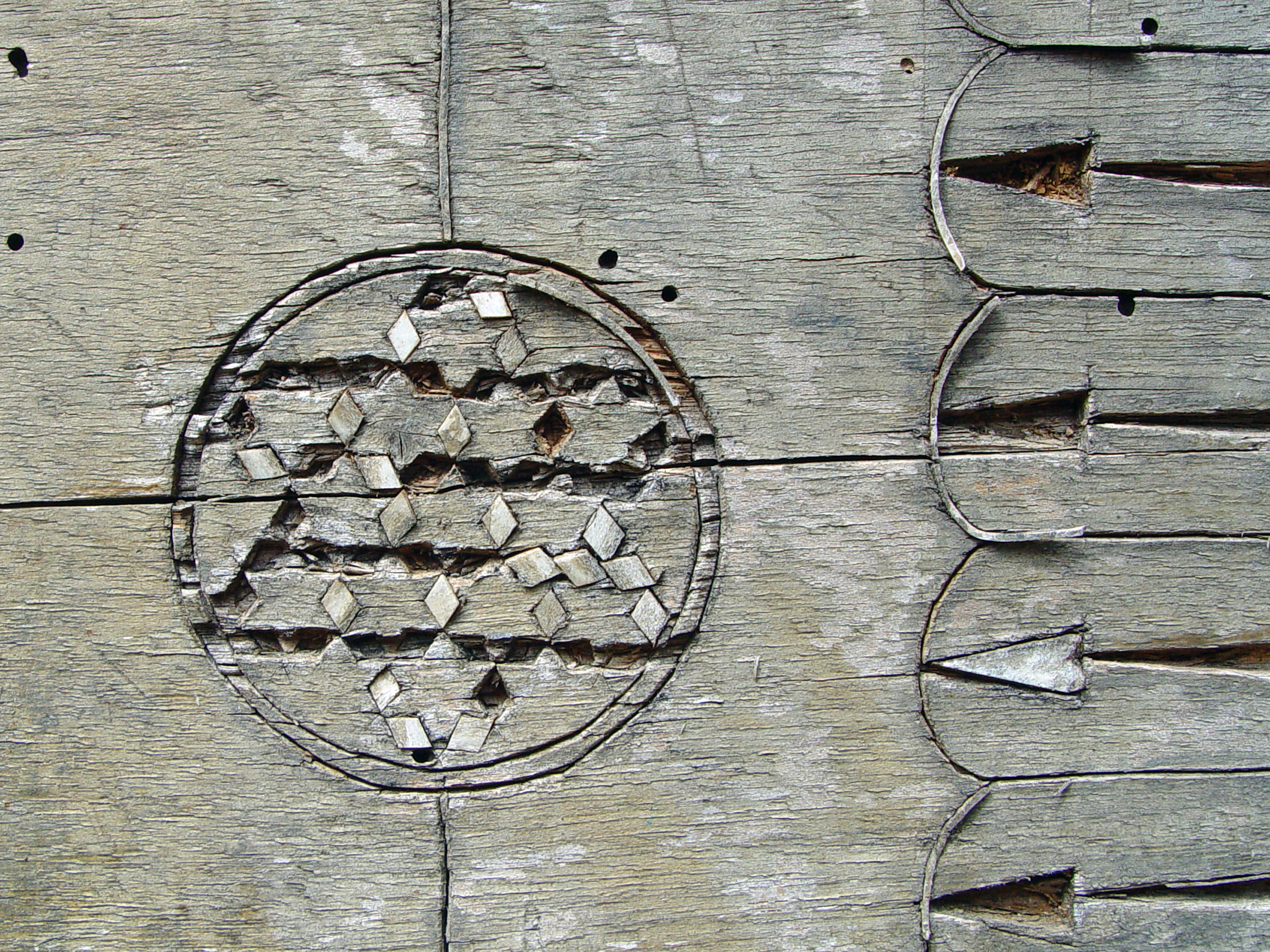
Decaying wood inlay on a chest in a Greek monastery.

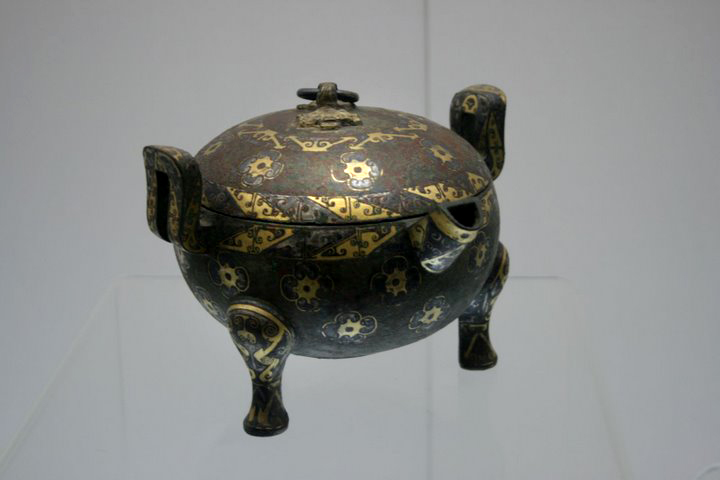
Ding bronze vessel with gold and silver inlay (damascening) from the Warring States period (403–221 BC) of ancient China (c. 300 BC)

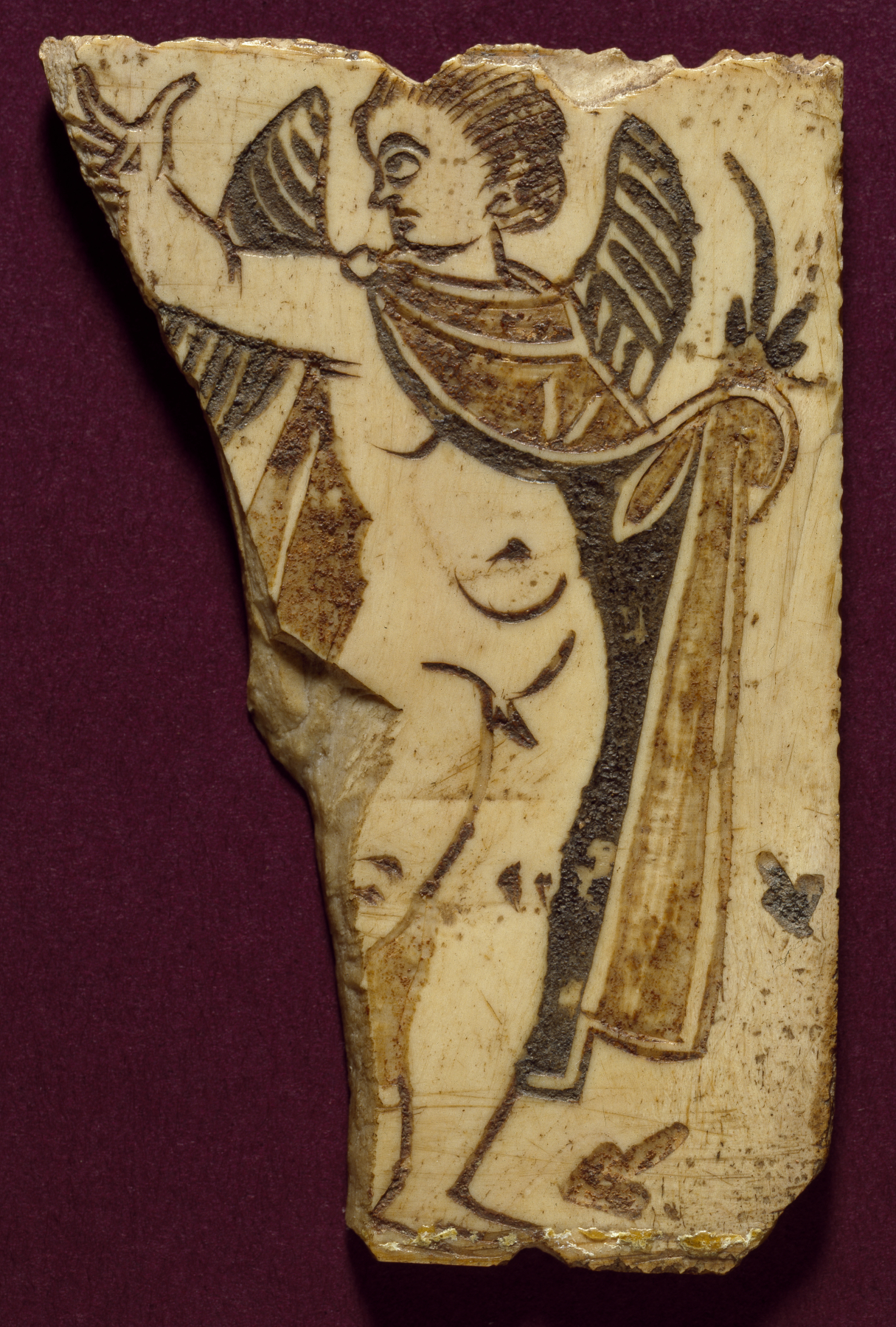
Egyptian bone plaque of a putto, with wax inlay, 4th century

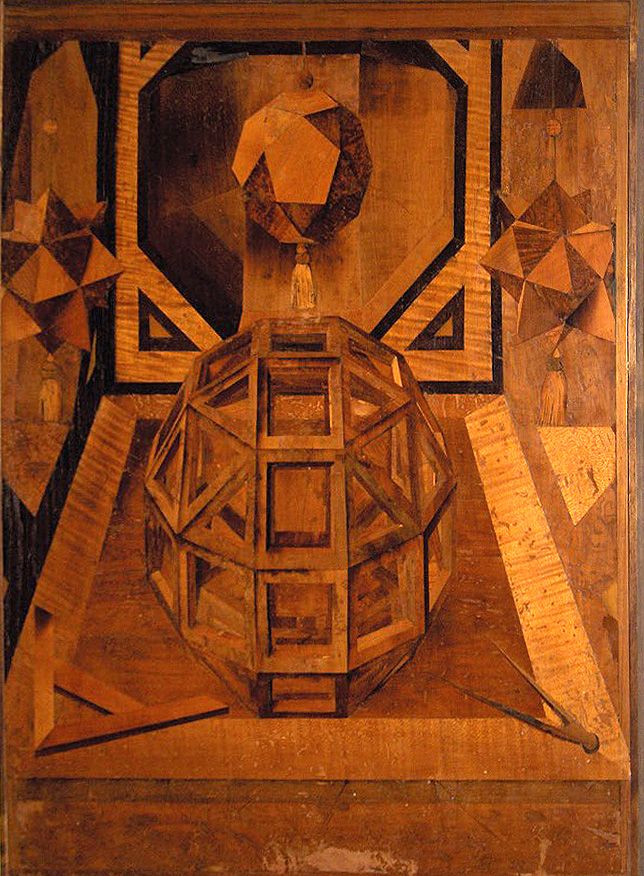
Geometric figure (1537) in wood intarsia by Fra Damiano da Bergamo, Bologna, Italy

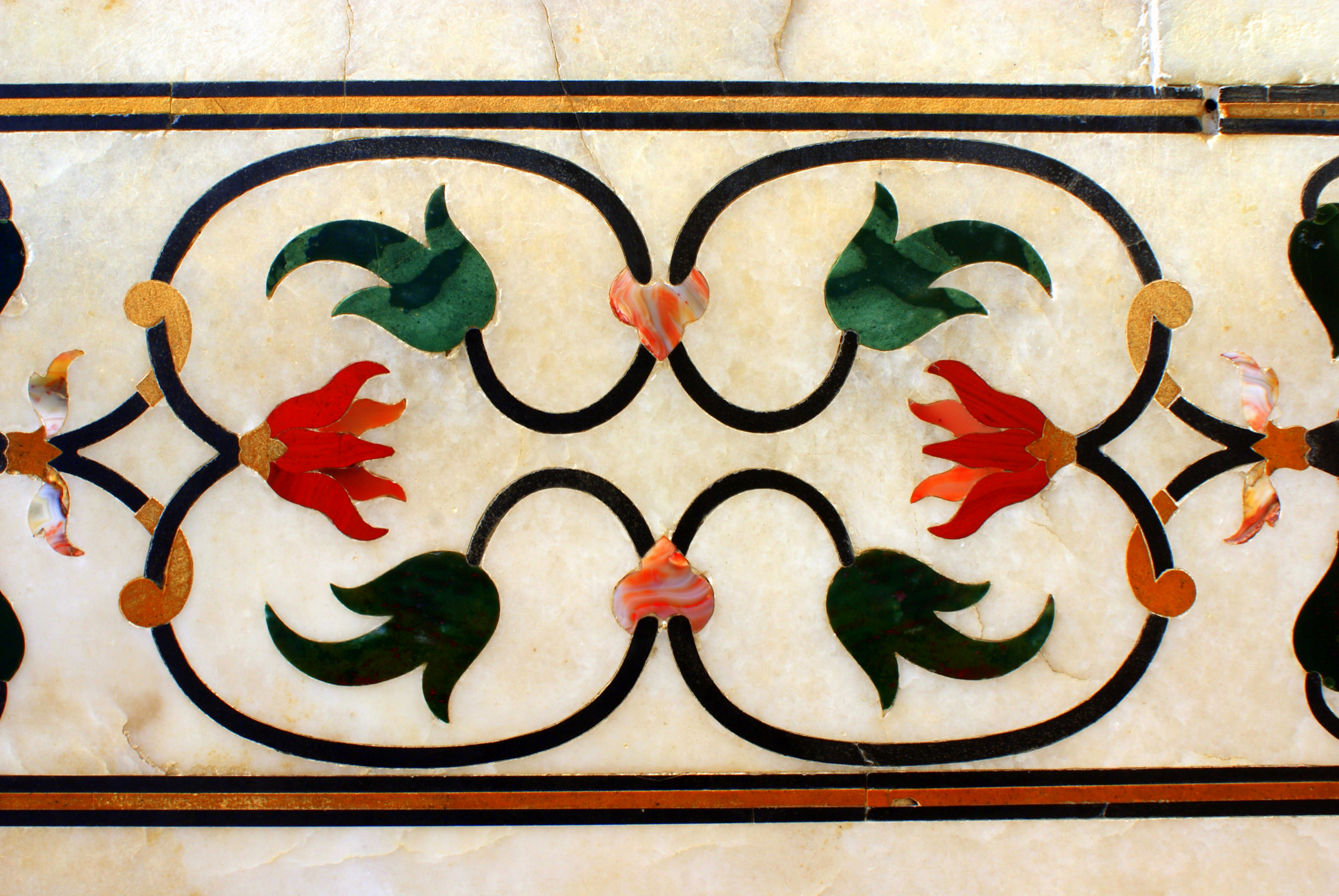
Parchin kara (pietra dura) in stone on the Taj Mahal

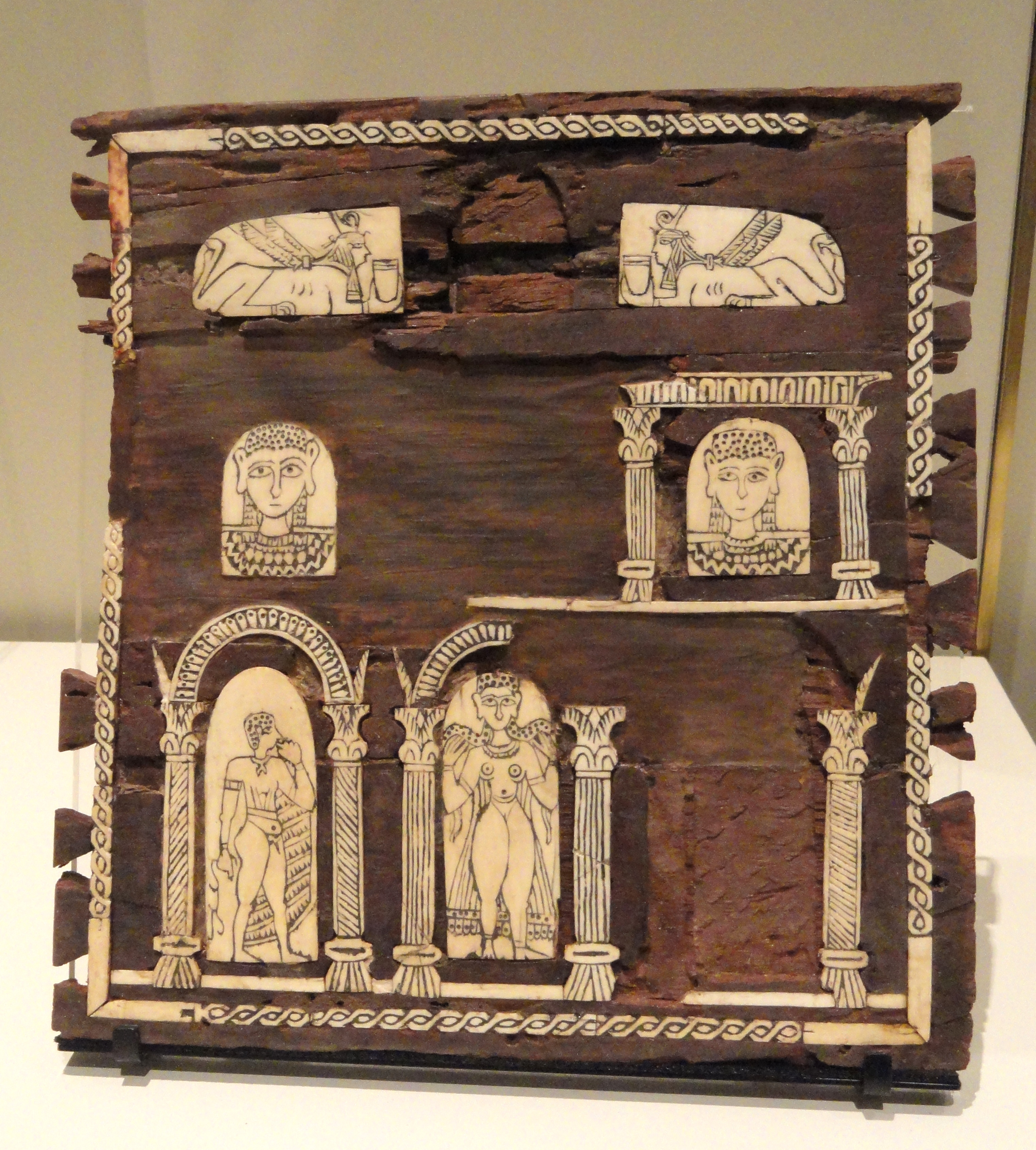
Nubian wooden box with inlaid ivory, Royal Ontario Museum, Toronto

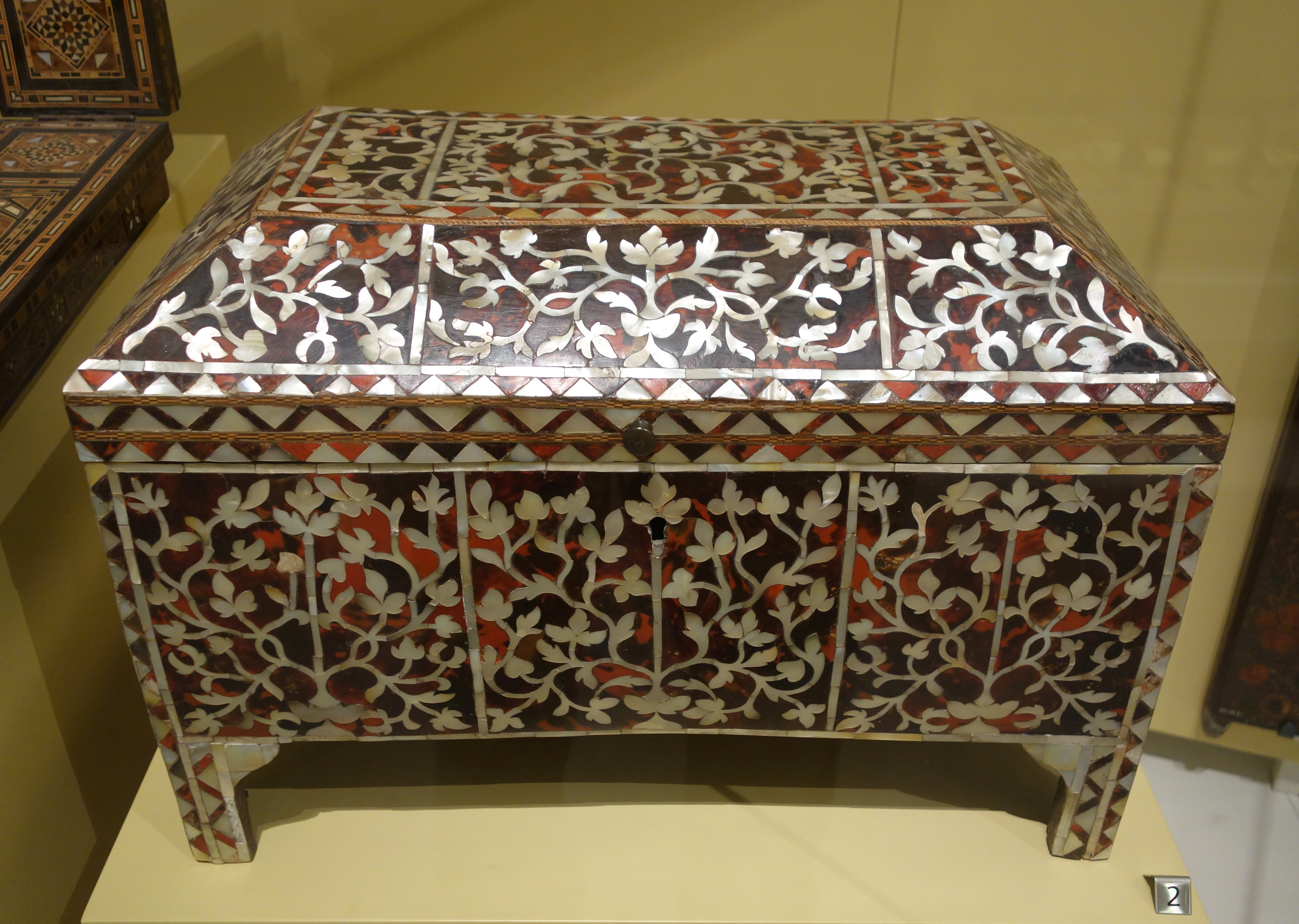
Marquetry casket, Ottoman Empire (Istanbul or North Africa), 17th–18th century, wood, tortoise shell, bone, ivory inlay.

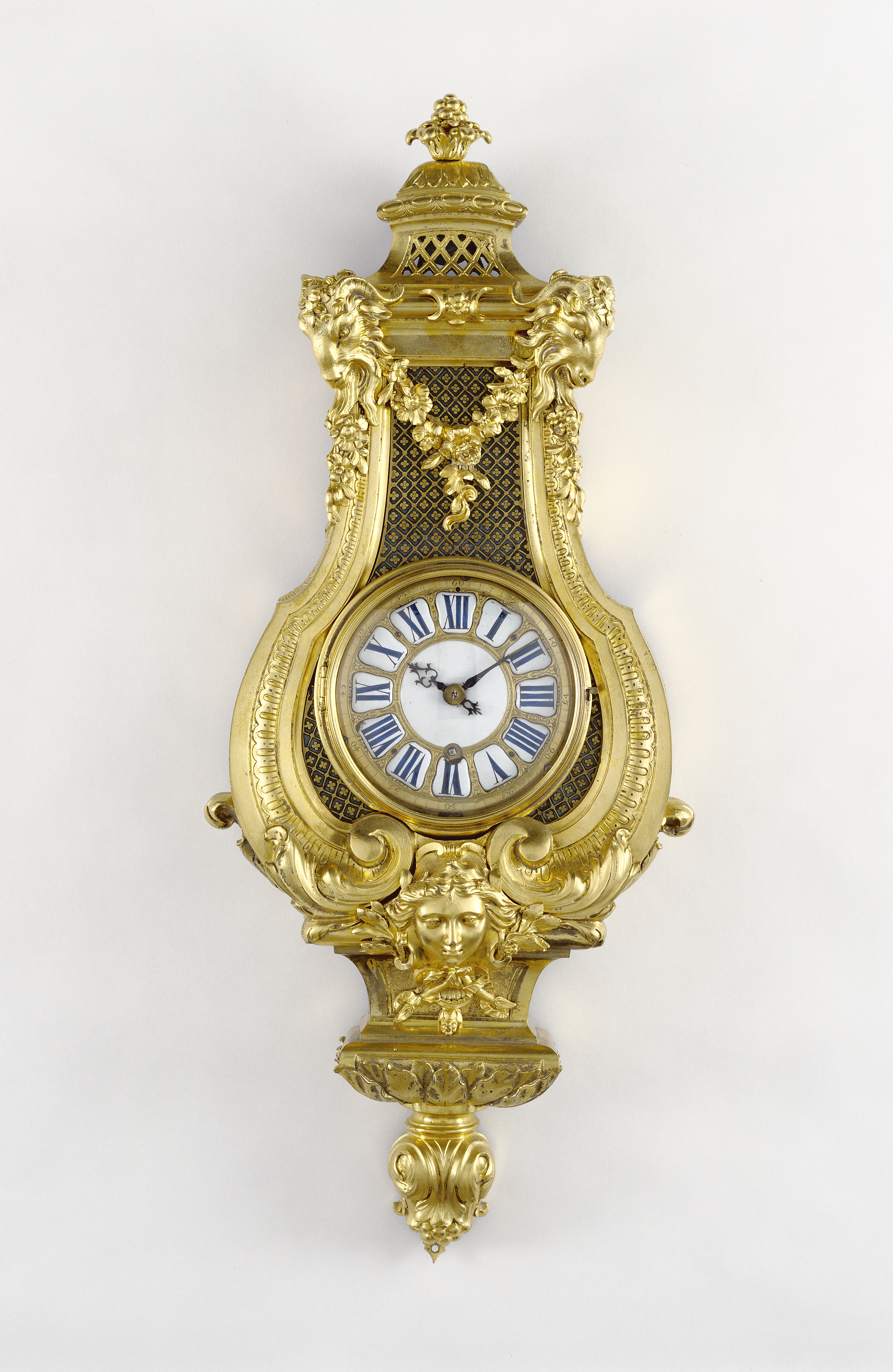
J. Paul Getty Museum: André-Charles Boulle, 1710, Boulle work inlay

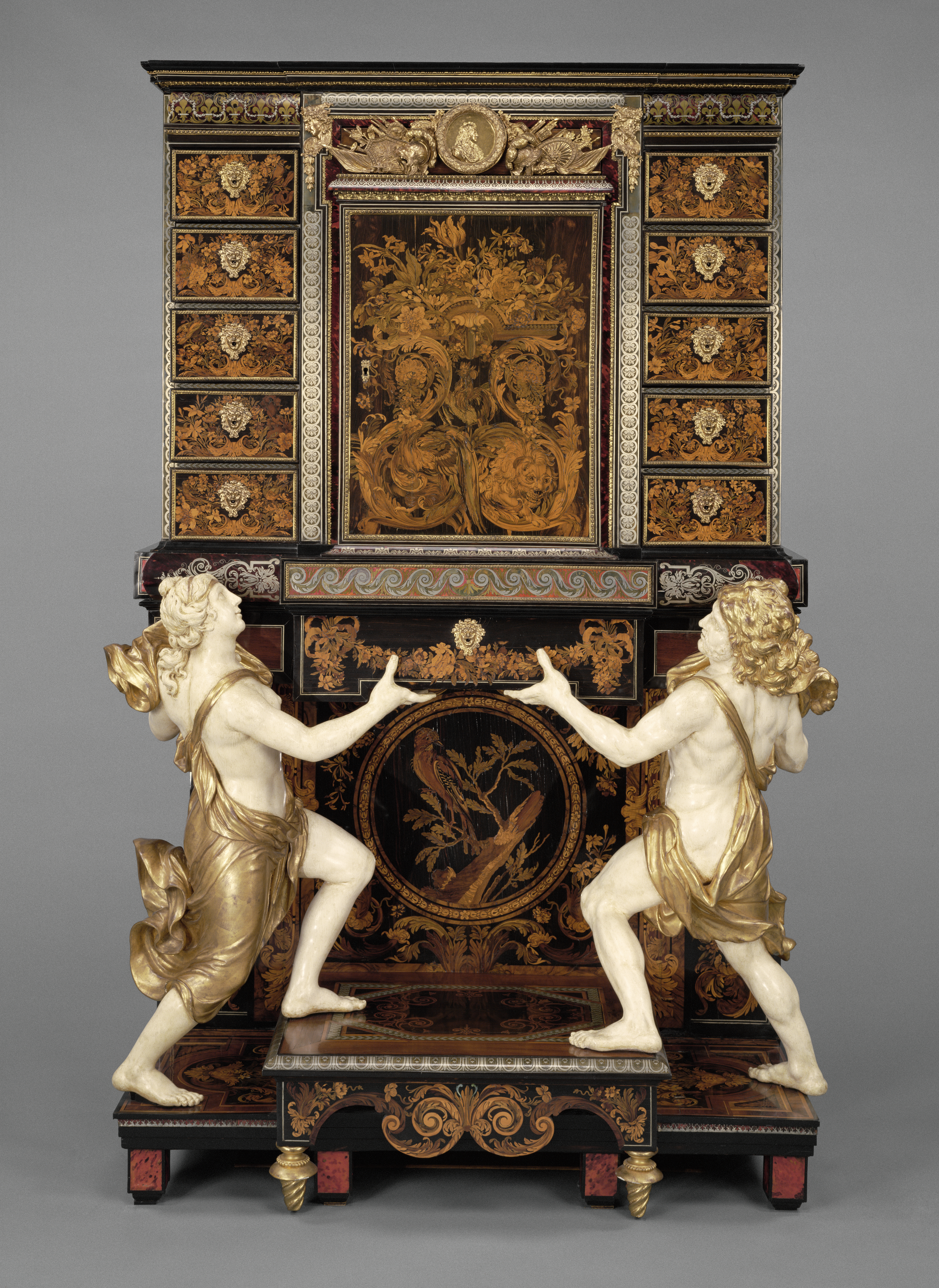
The J. Paul Getty Museum. André-Charles Boulle, 1675–1680; Boulle work inlay, Paris, France.

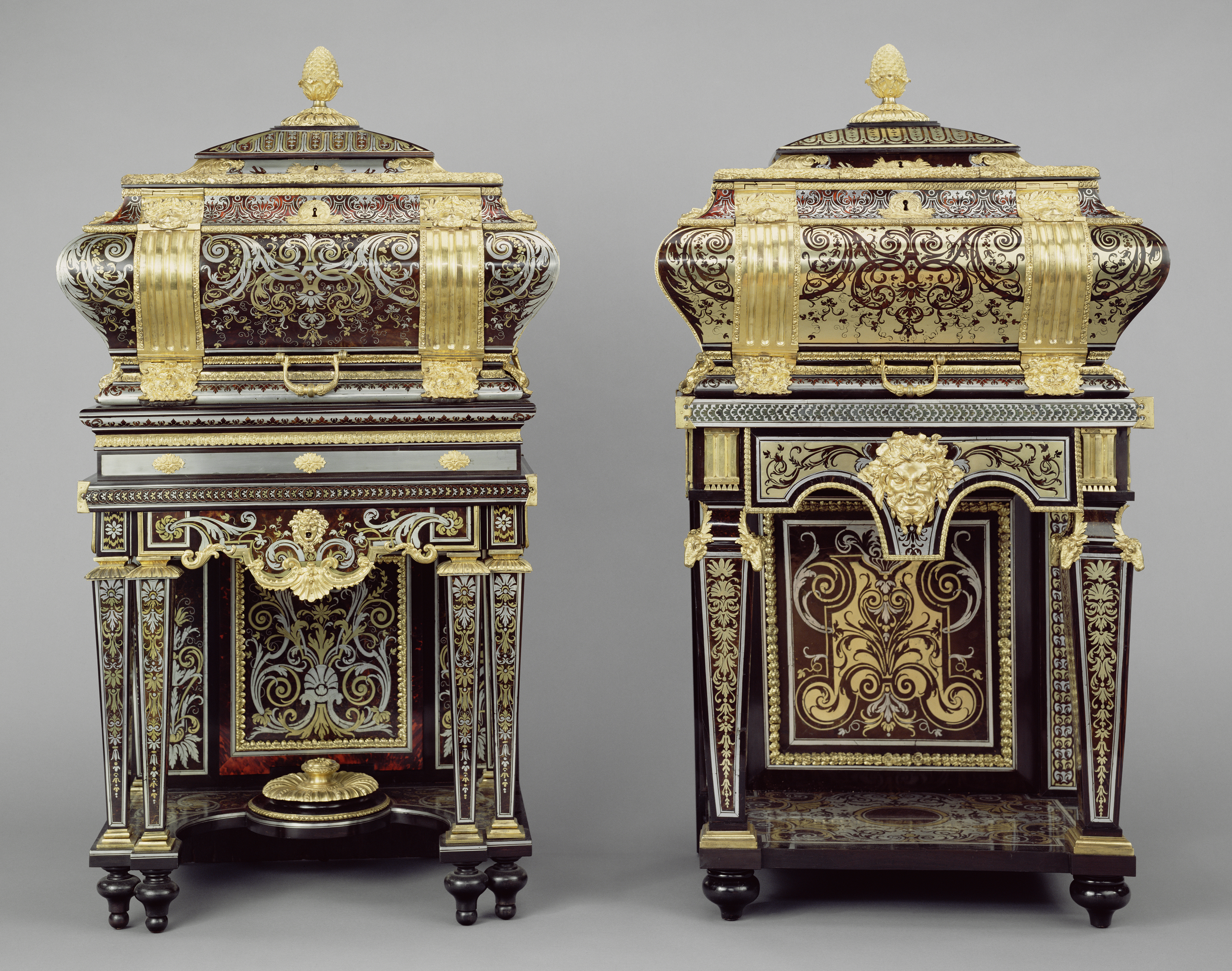
J. Paul Getty Museum, André-Charles Boulle, Boulle work inlay

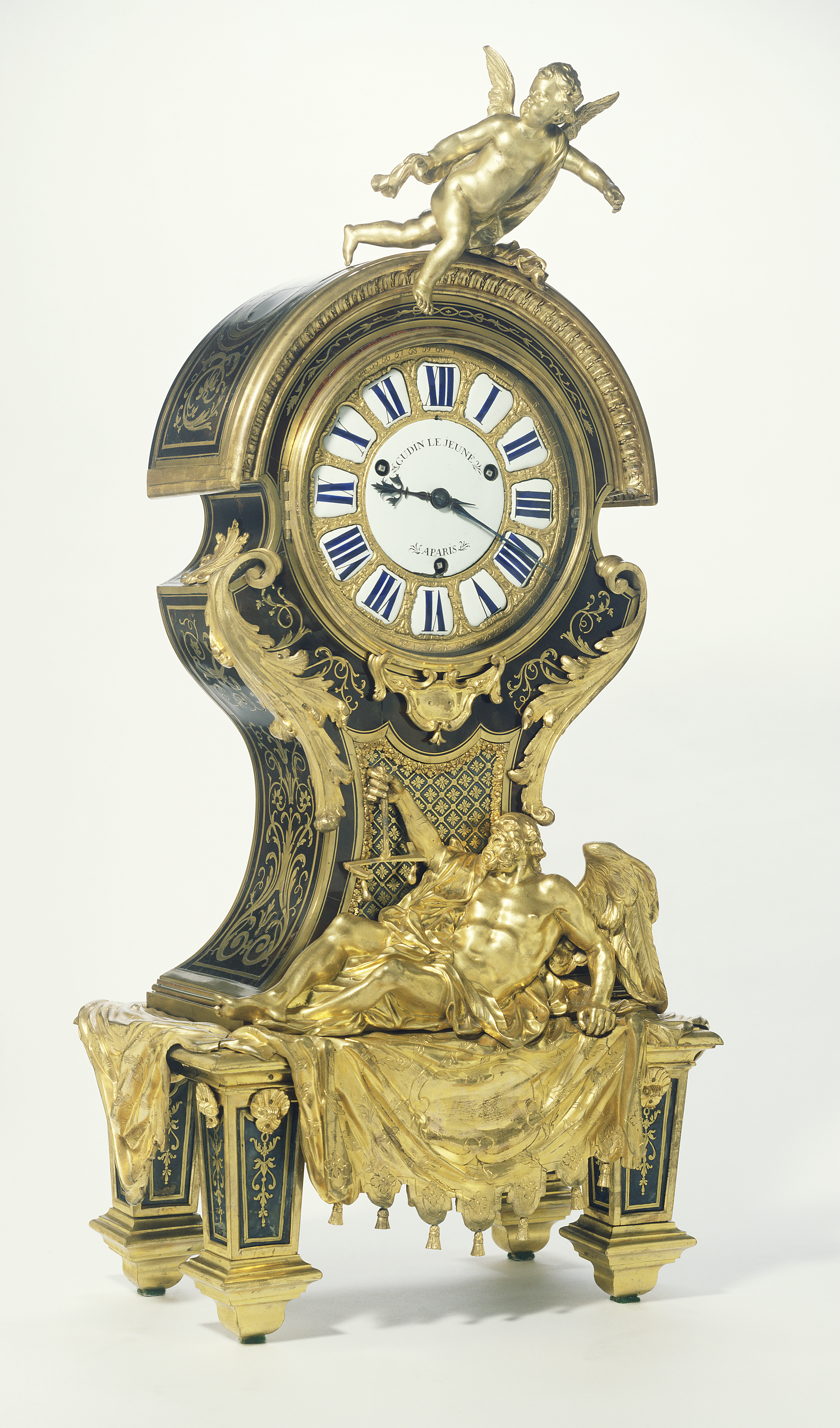
J. Paul Getty Museum : André-Charles Boulle, Boulle work inlay tortoiseshell, brass, ebony

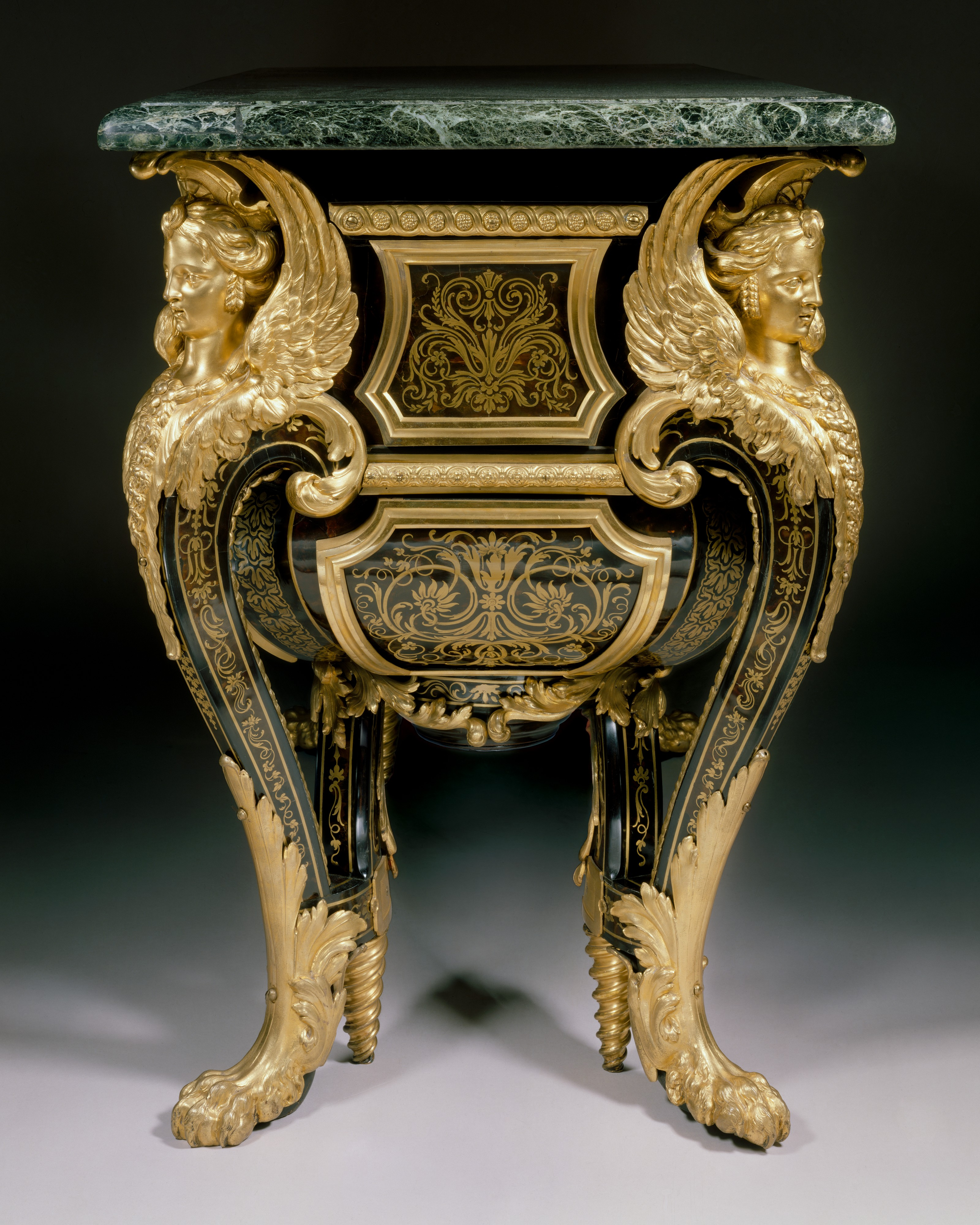
Commode André-Charles Boulle, son of Jean Boulle (c. 1710–20). Boulle work brass, tortoiseshell inlay.

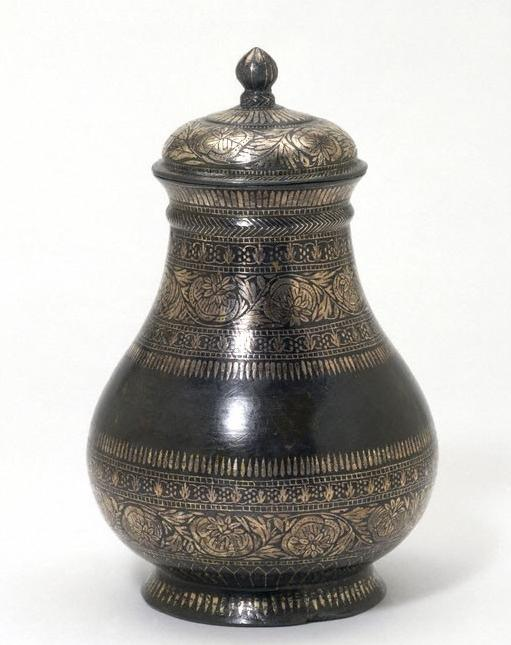
Bidriware cup and lid, c. 1850. V&A Museum.

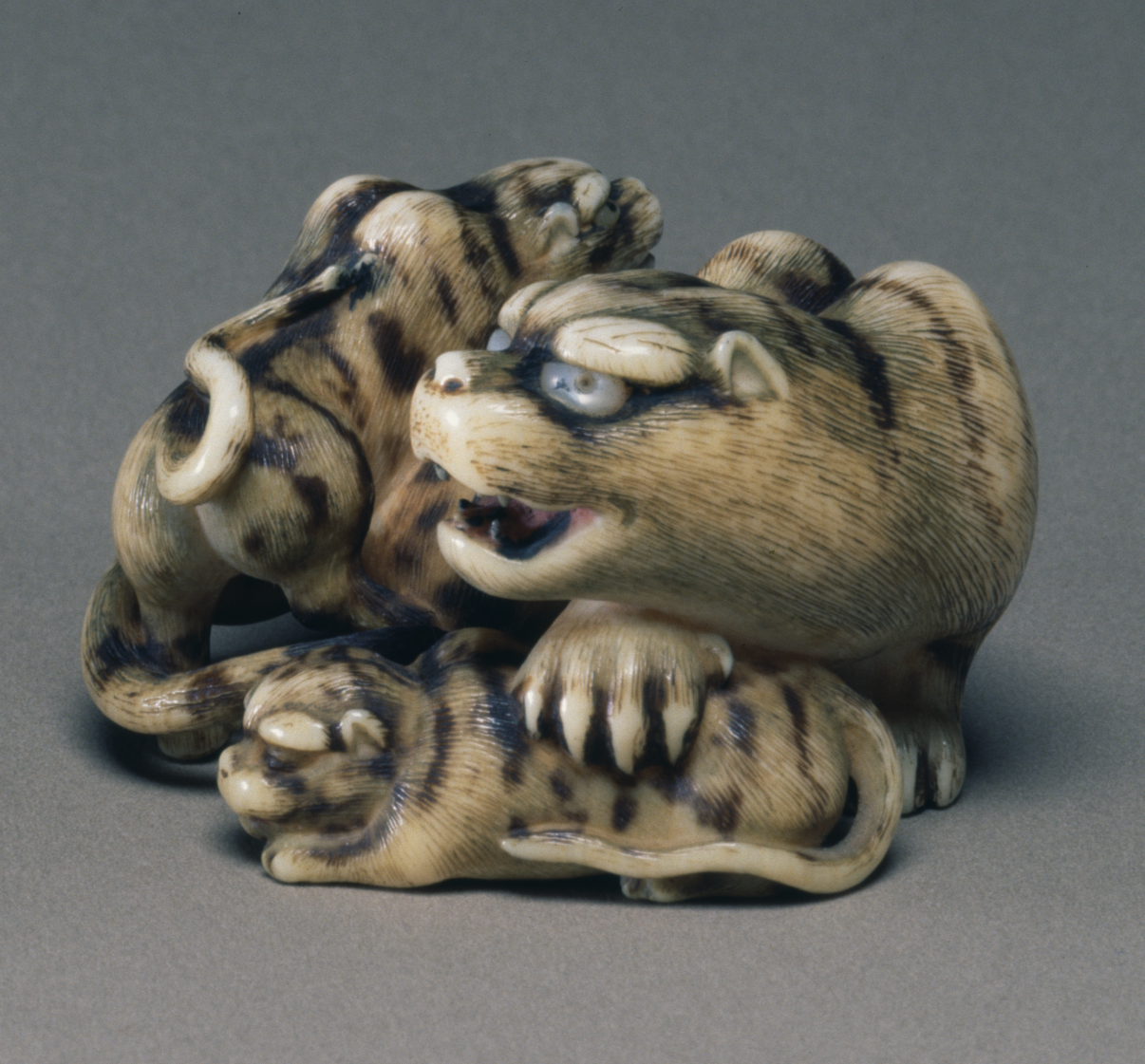
Japanese netsuke in ivory with ink; the eyes are inlaid in shell. 19th century

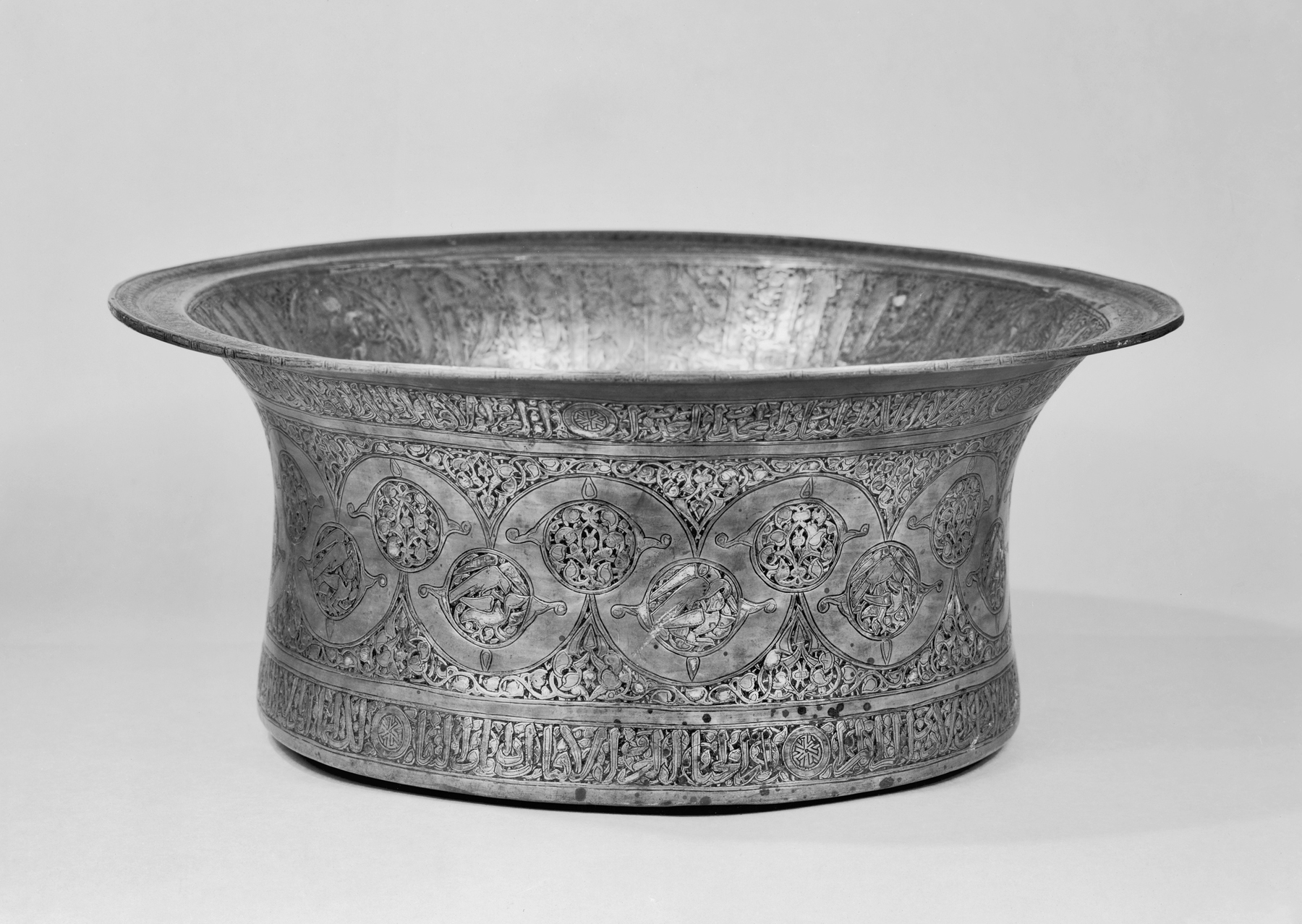
Egyptian basin with silver inlay (Walters Art Museum)

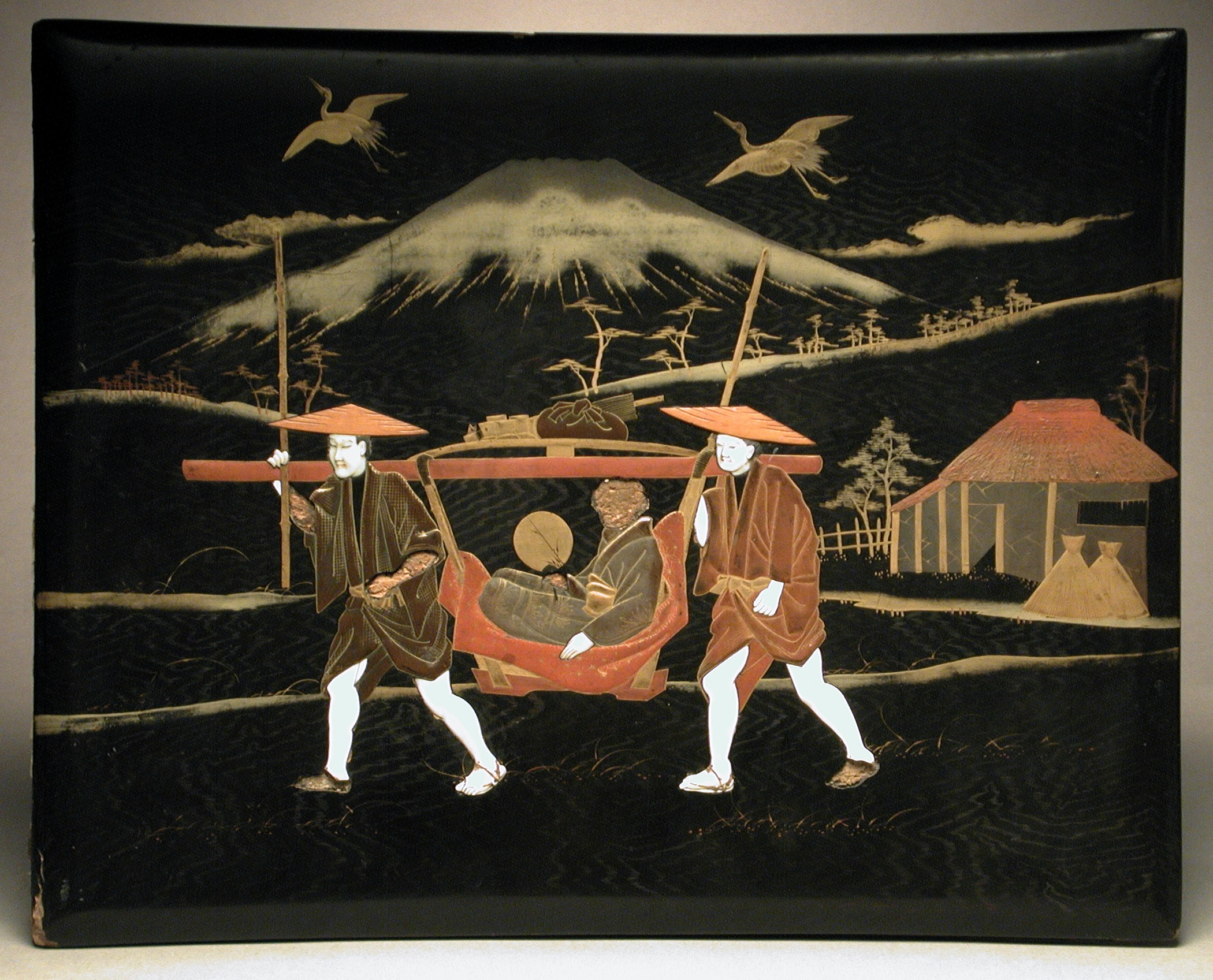
Japanese lacquerware Photograph Album Cover with ivory inlay, 1865

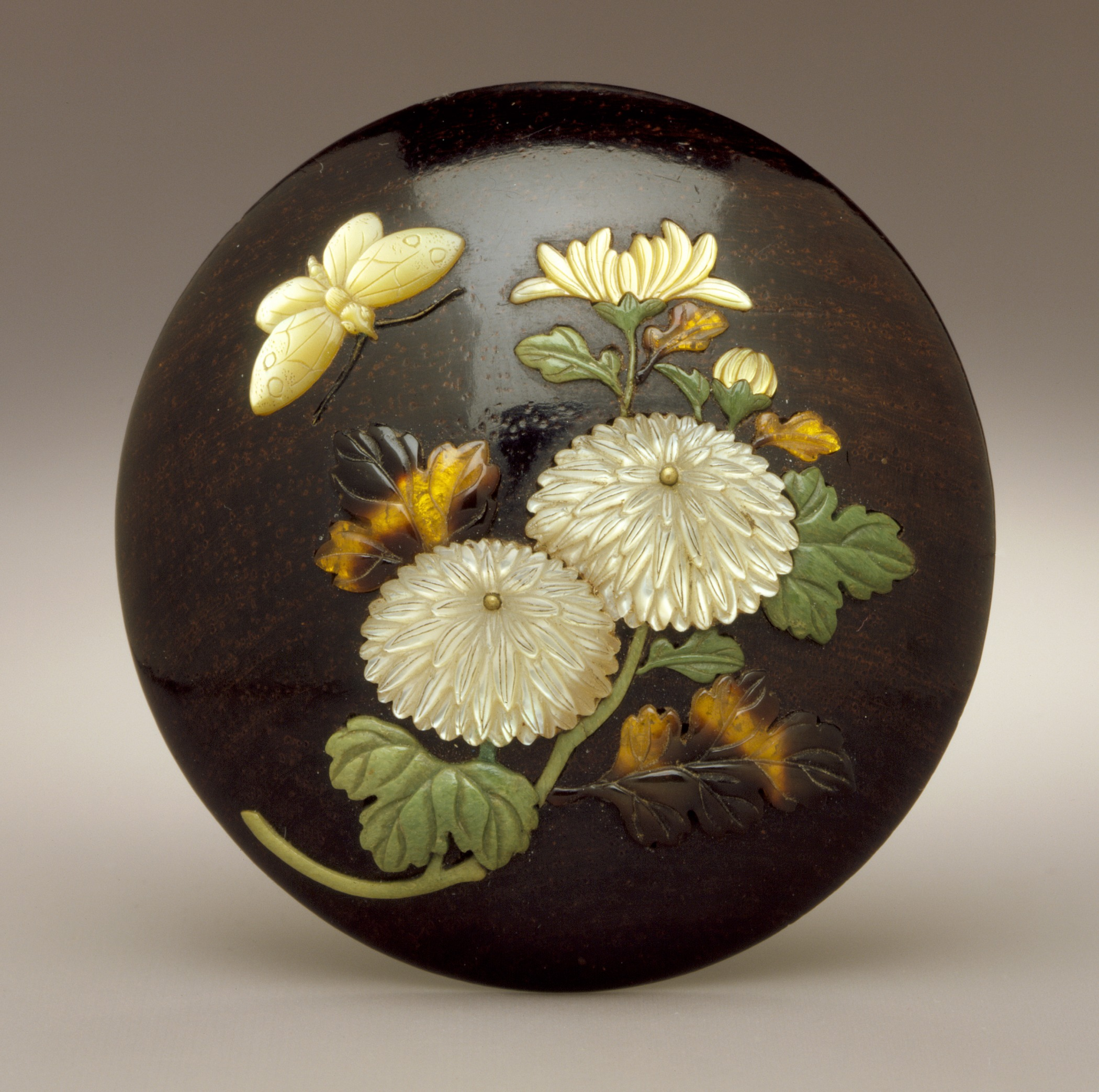
Japanese: late 19th century, wood with ivory, tortoiseshell, mother-of-pearl inlays; manjū type

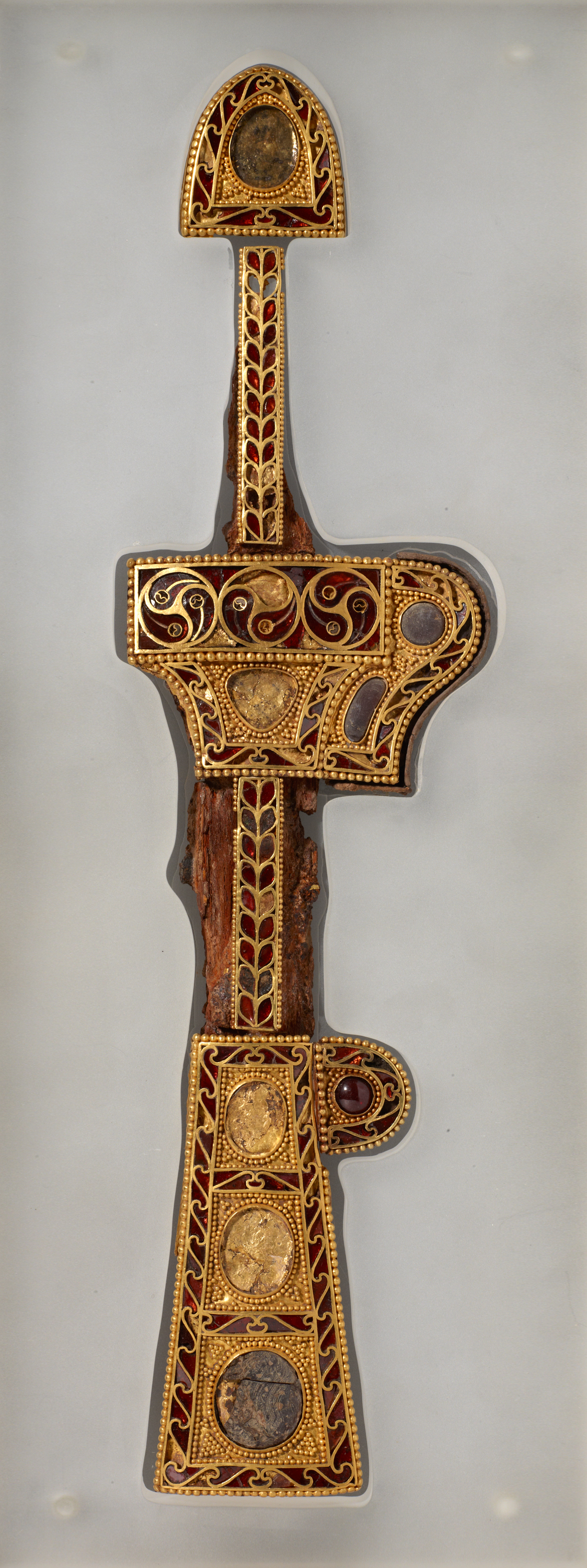
Gyerim-ro dagger and sheath, probably originating from the Black Sea region and discovered in a tomb from Silla Kingdom (c. 57 BCE – 935 CE), South Korea. Gyeongju National Museum, Gyeongju.

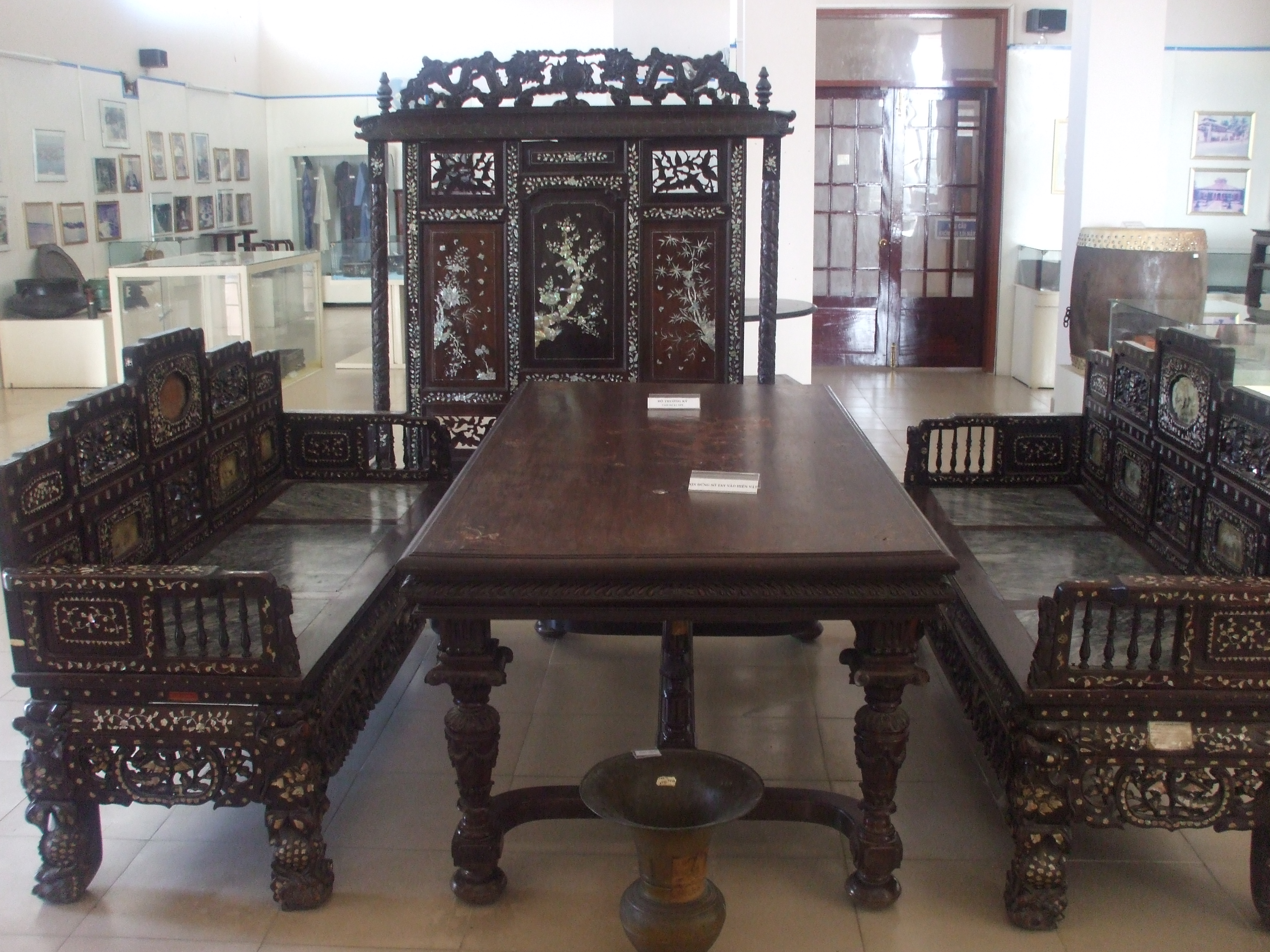
Mother of pearls inlaid furniture set in An Giang Museum, Vietnam.

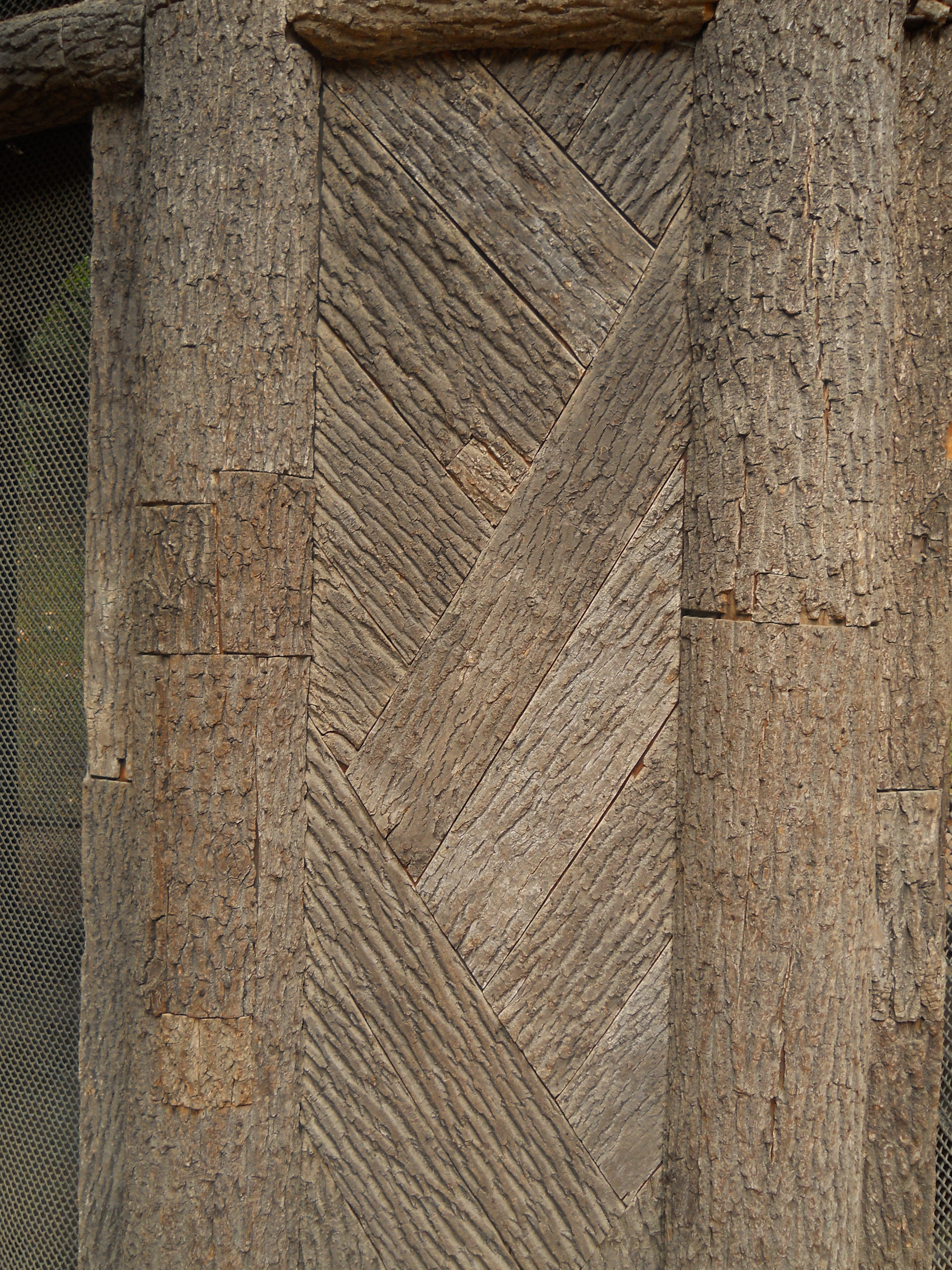
An element of a pheasant house inlaid with bark in the Sofiyivka Park

== See also ==
- Damascening
- Intarsia
- Marquetry
- Mosaic
- Niello
- Parquetry
