= Gyerim-ro dagger and sheath =

Black Sea artifact found in Korea

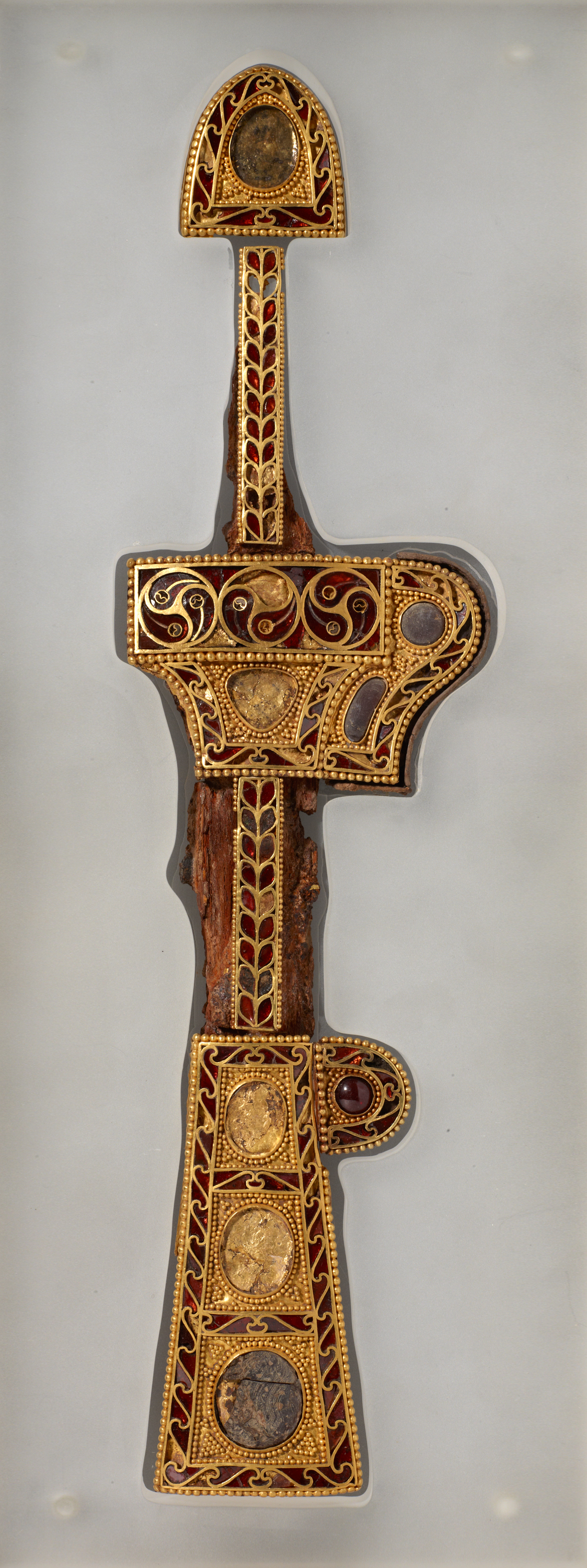
Gyerim-ro Dagger and Sheath (36cm, 14.1/8'')

The Gyerim-ro Dagger and Sheath (Korean: 경주 계림로 보검; Hanja: 慶州 鷄林路 寶劍) are ornately decorated treasures that were excavated from an ancient Korean tomb from the Silla Kingdom (57 BC – 935 AD) in 1973. They are understood to originate from the Black Sea area, testifying to the expansiveness of the Silk Road network in the ancient world.

== Description ==
The dagger and sheath are made up of gold, decorated with elaborate, colorful glass and garnet jewel inlays. The treasure is 14 1/8 in. (36 cm) in length and belongs to the Gyeongju National Museum of Korea. It is listed as Korea's Treasure No. 635.

== History ==
The Gyerim-ro Dagger and Sheath were excavated from the Gyerim-ro Tomb No. 14 in 1973 in North Gyeongsang Province. The dagger is understood to have originated from Persia area of Central Asia sometime during the 5th century, coming to Korea through trade or as a diplomatic gift. This was determined by comparing the dagger and sheath to other items of similar construction depicted in wall paintings, and fragments. The dagger has a decorative and functional head at the end of the handle and the sheath has two side appendages. These were used to attach the dagger to the carrier's belt, from which it hung horizontally.

A deeper understanding of this double-appendage suspension system supports the theory that the Hephthalite invasion of Central Asia brought with it an introduction of the two-point hanging system to (as seen in the Gyerim-ro dagger and sheath), which has since become recognizable as the Eastern Eurasian dagger and sword suspension systems that was carried on from Central Asia to China. The two-point suspension system's arrival in China is likely a result of the Silk Road. Vast scholarship on the Silk Road informs that trade between Central Asia and East Asia was affluent and thriving during the 5th century, and thus the occurrence of a Persian area item in a Korean tomb should not come as a surprise.

== Influence ==
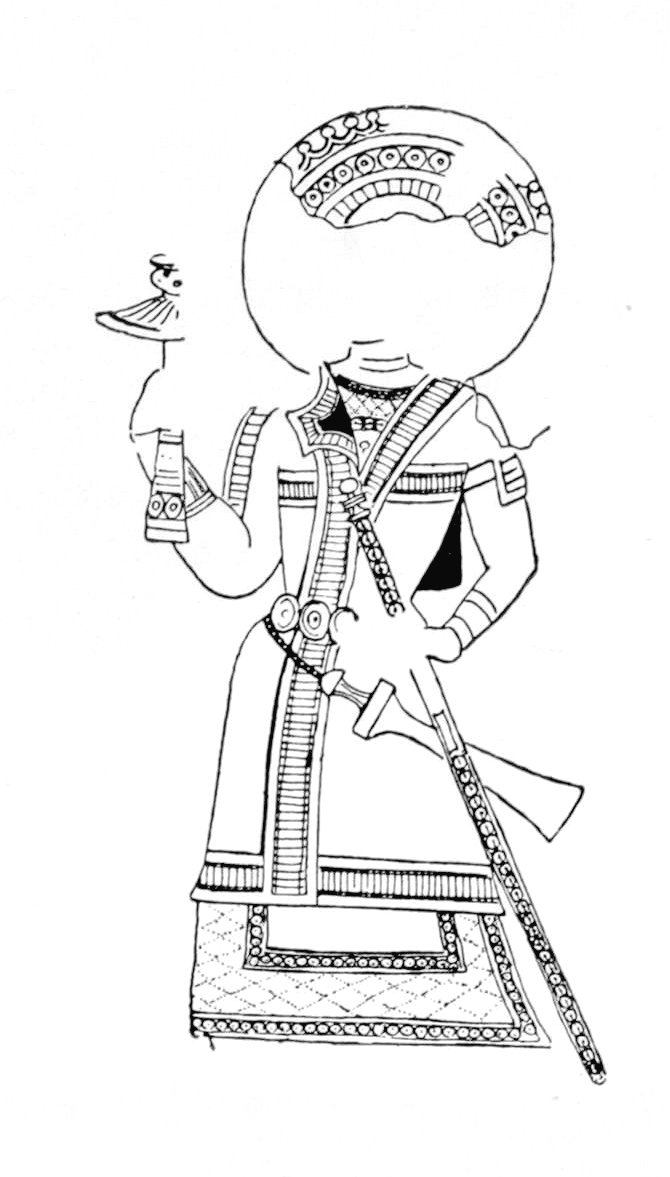
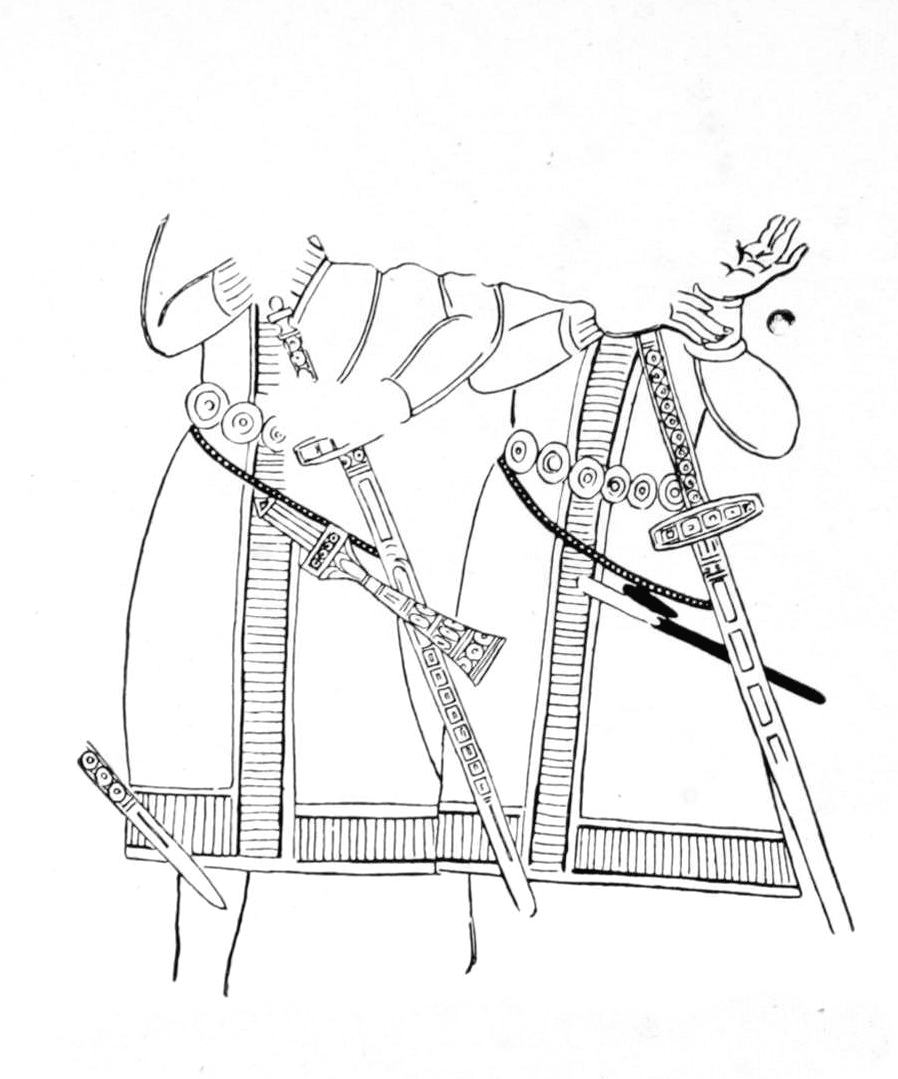
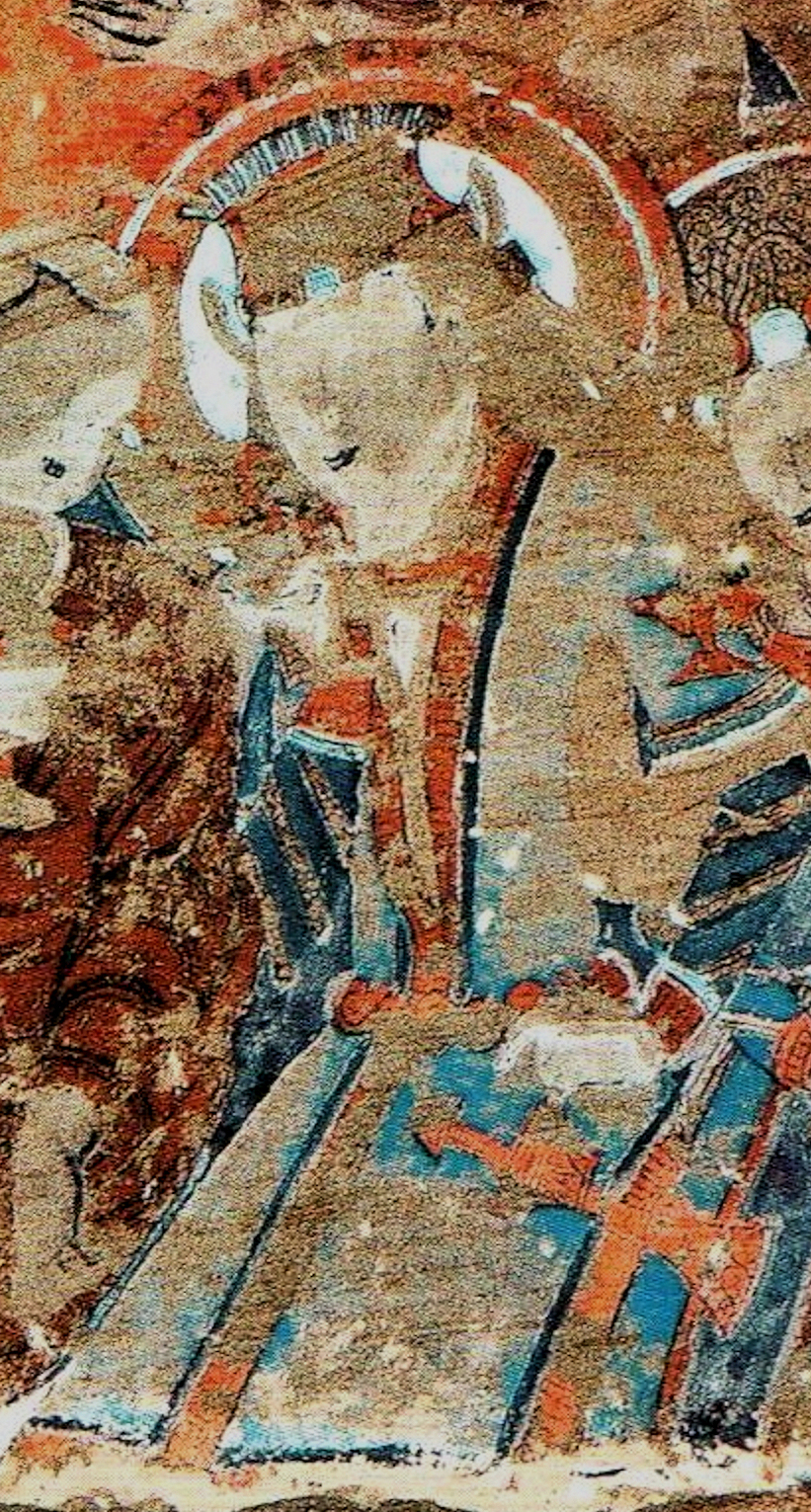
Similar dagger and sheath designs are visible in the Tocharian Kumtura Caves (left and center), and Kizil Cave no.69.

Choe Kwang-shik argues that Northern and Western influences are found in Silla art, specifically those from the Scythian nomadic peoples, which provided a direct link between Silla and the coastal area of the Black Sea. Other examples of Scythian influence on the Silla Kingdom include the Bronze Horse-Shaped Buckle and the Silla Crowns. These contain animal motifs characteristic of Scythian art. Korea's connection to the Scythian peoples. This demonstrates Korea's involvement with the Silk Road and provides an explanation for the value of placing a dagger and sheath in a tomb. The Gyerim-ro Dagger and Sheath were likely symbols of social class and the achievements of the person who wore them. Similar to the Sutton Hoo burial site, the purpose of laying someone to rest with their treasured weapon was to signify worth and aspirations for life after death.

== See also ==
- History of Korea
- History of Sino-Korean relations
- Silk Road
