= Boulle work =

Decorative technique for furniture

Boulle work (also known as buhl work) is a type of rich marquetry process or inlay perfected by the French cabinetmaker André-Charles Boulle (1642–1732). It involves veneering furniture with tortoiseshell inlaid primarily with brass and pewter in elaborate designs, often incorporating arabesques.

Although Boulle did not invent the technique, he was its greatest practitioner and gave his name to it. Boulle came from a well-known Protestant family of artists in France living primarily in Paris but also in Marseille. The first recorded payment to Boulle by the crown, from 1669, specifies ouvrages de peinture, suggesting that he was originally a painter. Boulle was awarded the title of master cabinetmaker around 1666; in 1672 he received the post of Premier ébéniste du Roi and was admitted to a group of skilled artists maintained by Louis XIV, in the Louvre Palace. In 1672 Boulle received a warrant signed by the queen, giving him the added title of bronzier as well as Ebeniste du Roi. One of Boulle's greatest masterpieces is his decoration of the dauphin's private study, created between 1681 and 1683. Boulle's masterpieces are now mostly in museums and have come to represent the wealth, luxury and finesse of the court of Louis XIV, the Sun King.

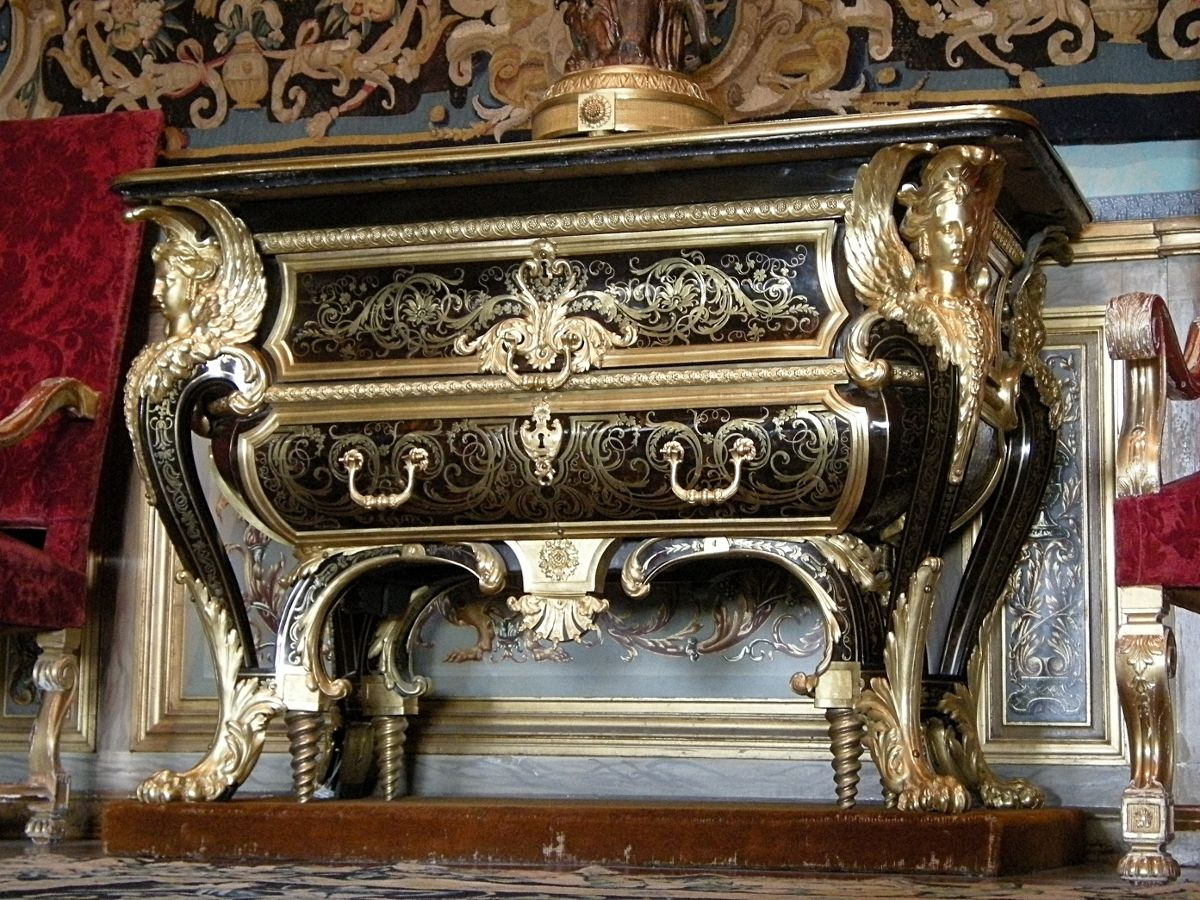

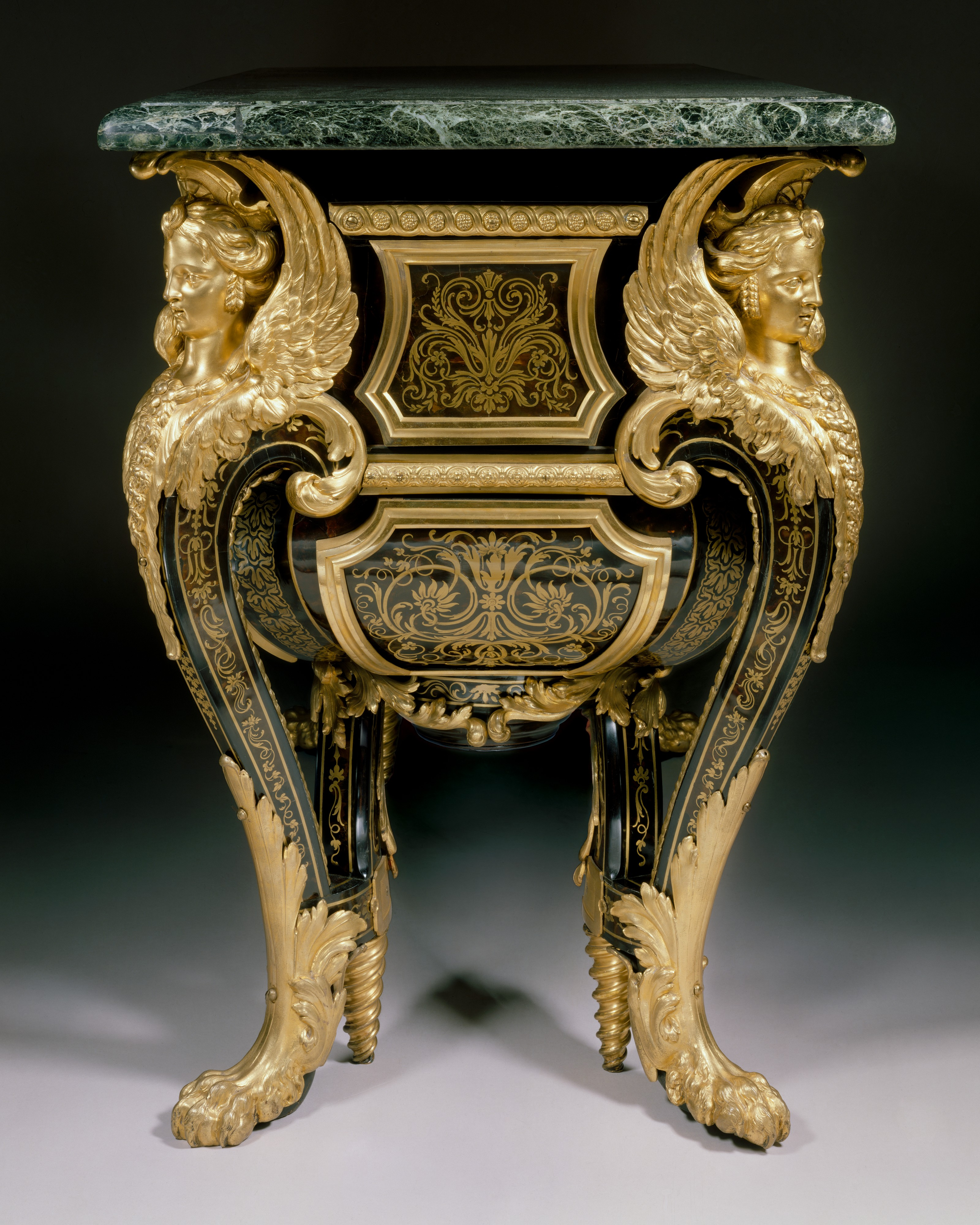

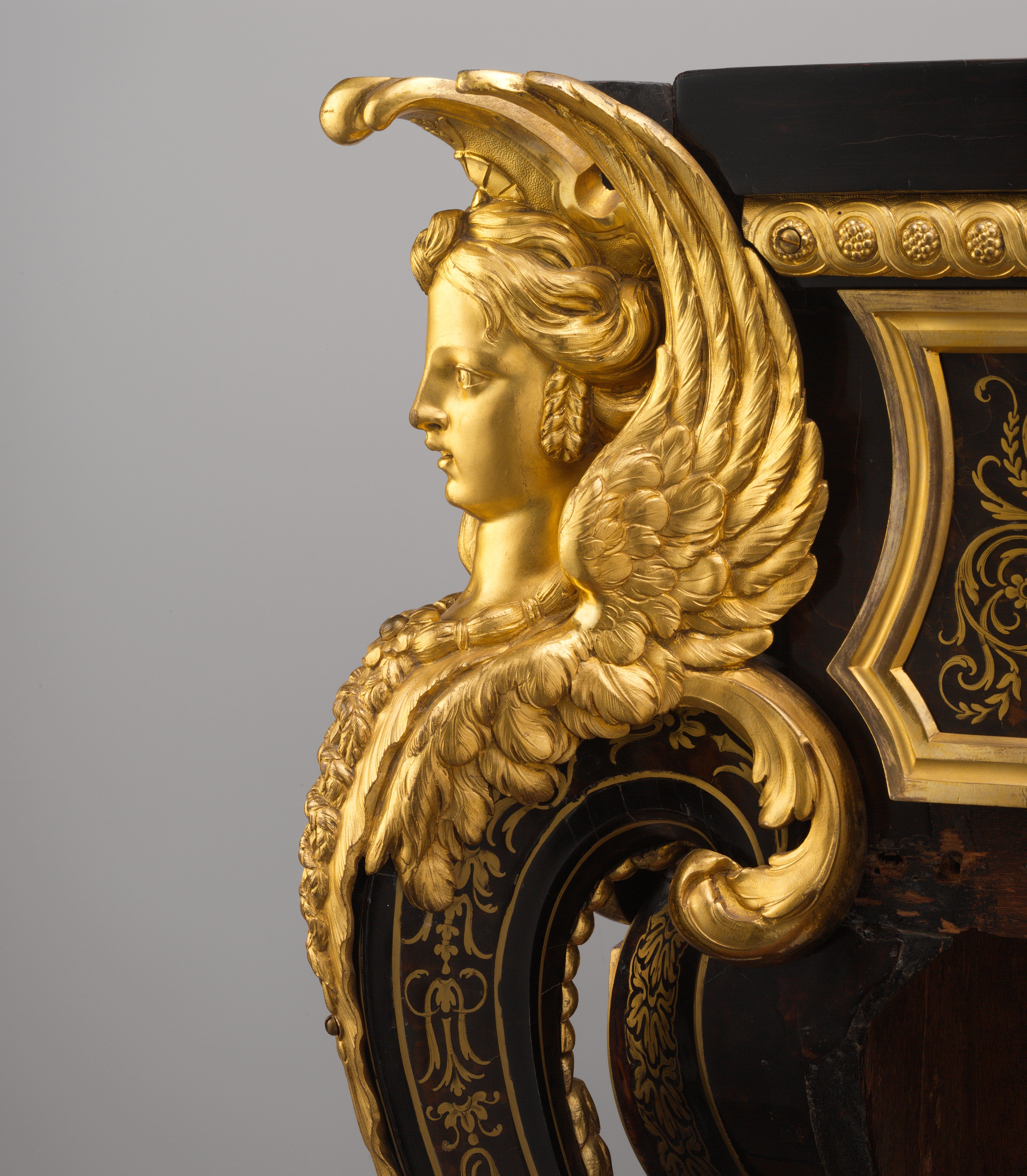

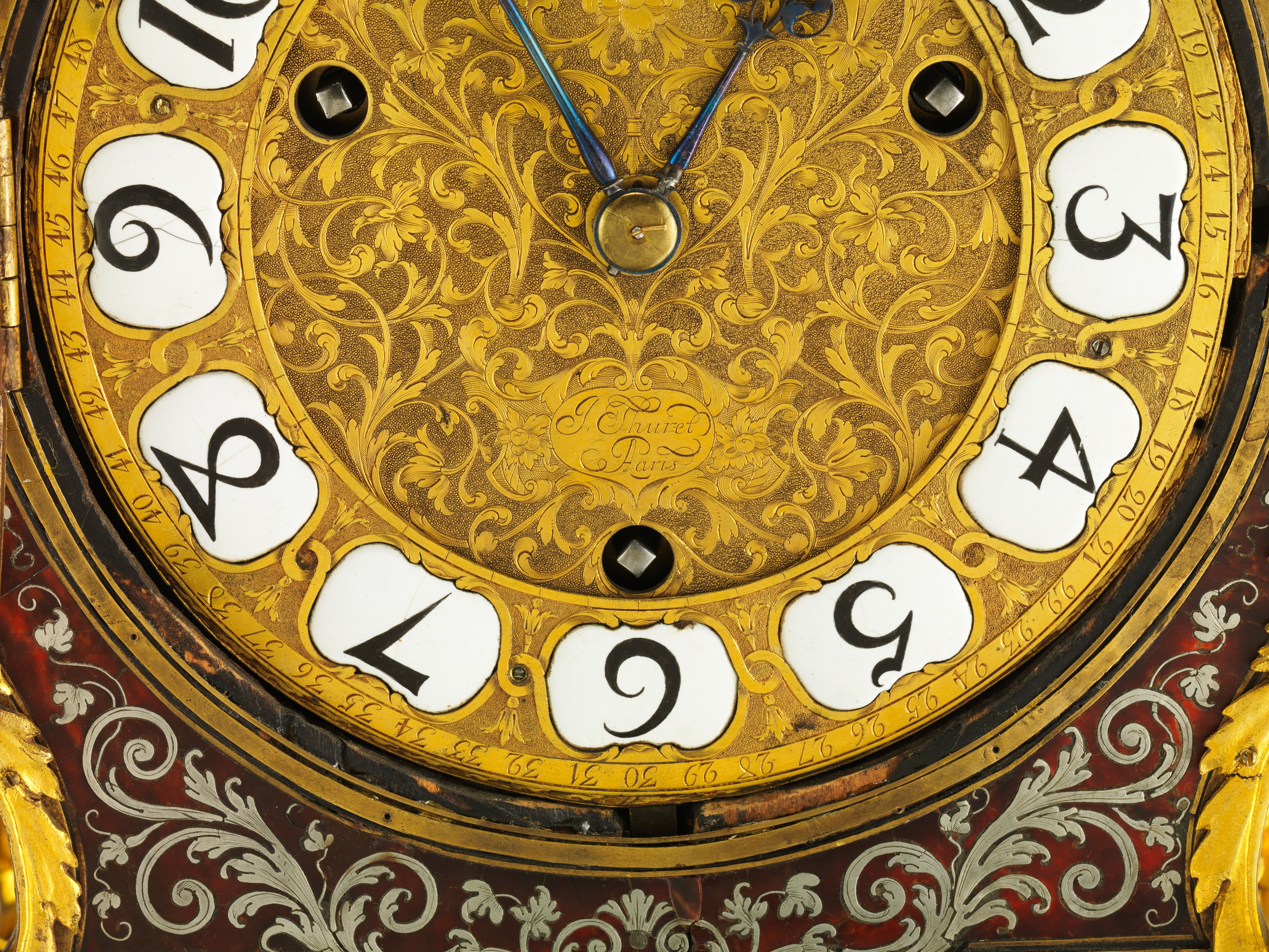

== See also ==
- École Boule
