= History of Oceania =

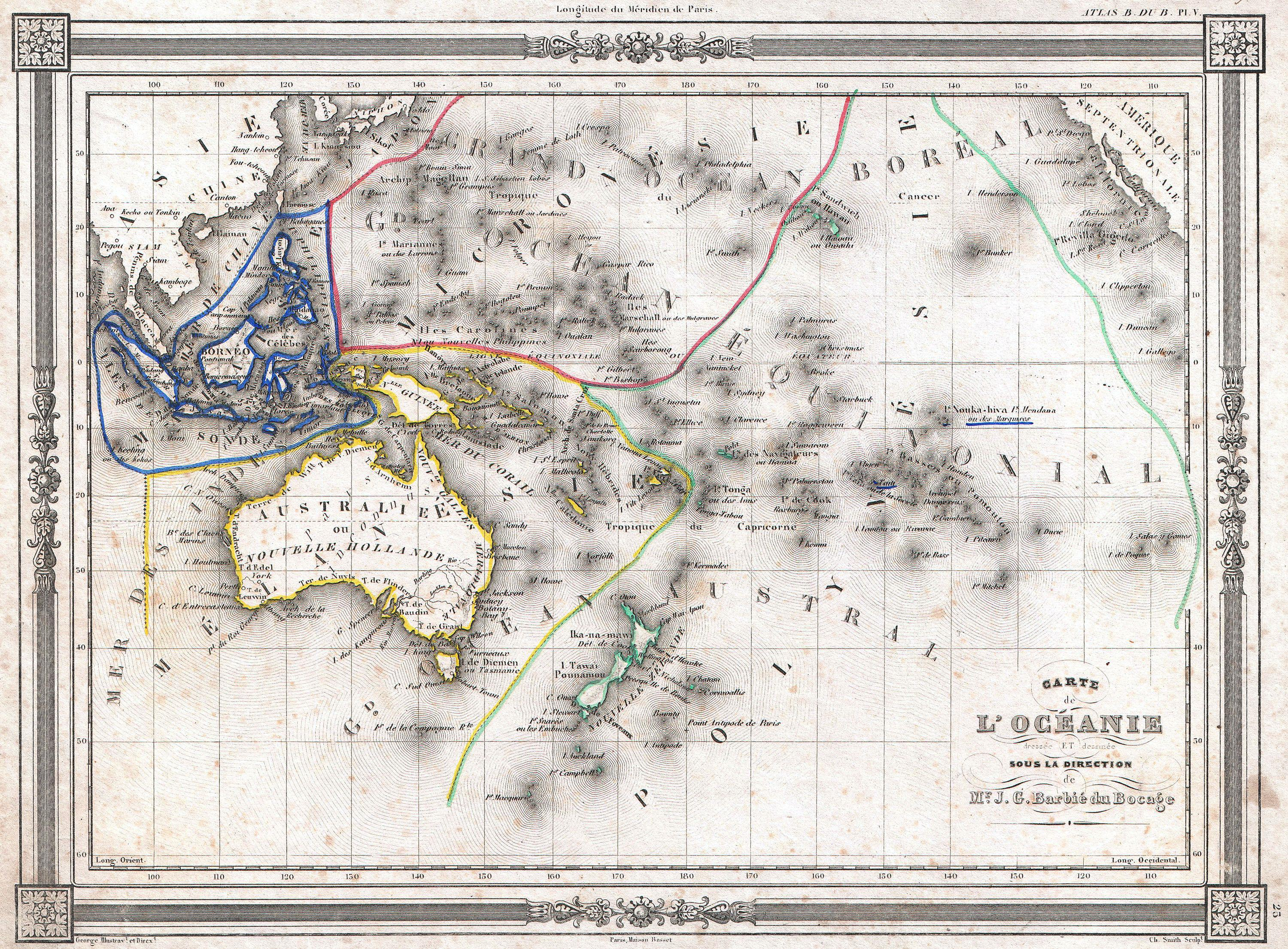
1852 map of Oceania by J.G. Barbie du Bocage, including subregions of Melanesia, Micronesia and Polynesia.

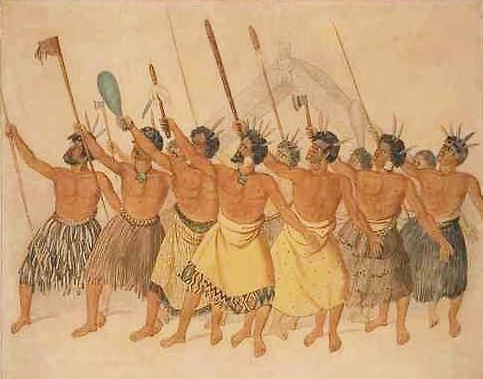
Māori war dance, New Zealand, circa 1850

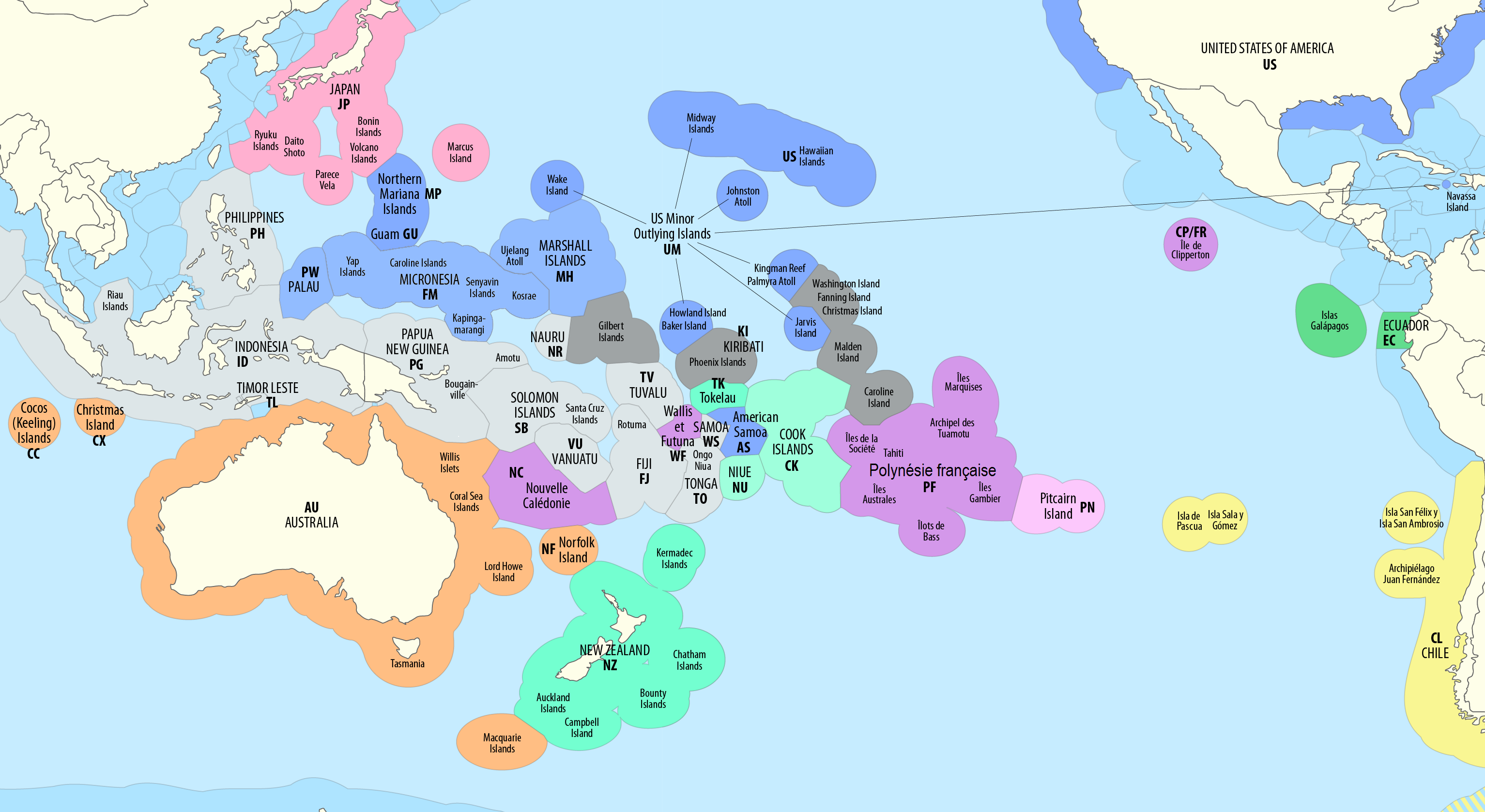
An exclusive economic zone map of the Pacific which excludes non-tropical islands

The history of Oceania includes the history of Australia, Easter Island, Fiji, Hawaii, New Zealand, Papua New Guinea, Western New Guinea and, other Pacific island nations.

== Prehistory ==
The prehistory of Oceania is divided into the prehistory of each of its major areas: Australia, Melanesia, Micronesia, and Polynesia, and these vary greatly as to when they were first inhabited by humans — from 70,000 years ago (Near Oceania) to 3,000 years ago (Remote Oceania).

=== Australia ===
Indigenous Australians are the original inhabitants of the Australian continent and nearby islands. Indigenous Australians migrated from Africa to Asia around 70,000 years ago and arrived in Australia around 50,000 years ago. The Torres Strait Islanders are indigenous to the Torres Strait Islands, which are at the northernmost tip of Queensland near Papua New Guinea. The term "Aboriginal" is traditionally applied to only the indigenous inhabitants of mainland Australia and Tasmania, along with some of the adjacent islands, i.e.: the "first peoples". Indigenous Australians is an inclusive term used when referring to both Aboriginal and Torres Strait islanders.

The earliest definite human remains found to date are that of Mungo Man, which have been dated at about 40,000 years old, but the time of arrival of the ancestors of Indigenous Australians is a matter of debate among researchers, with estimates dating back as far as 125,000 years ago. There is great diversity among different Indigenous communities and societies in Australia, each with its own unique mixture of cultures, customs and languages. In present-day Australia these groups are further divided into local communities.

=== Melanesia ===
The first settlers of Australia, New Guinea, and the large islands just to the east arrived between 50,000 and 30,000 years ago, when Neanderthals still roamed Europe. The original inhabitants of the group of islands now named Melanesia were likely the ancestors of the present-day Papuan-speaking people. Migrating from Southeast Asia, they appear to have occupied these islands as far east as the main islands in the Solomon Islands (archipelago), including Makira and possibly the smaller islands farther to the east.

Particularly along the north coast of New Guinea and in the islands north and east of New Guinea, the Austronesian peoples, who had migrated into the area somewhat more than 3,000 years ago, came into contact with these pre-existing populations of Papuan-speaking peoples. In the late 20th century, some academics proposed a long period of interaction that led to numerous complex changes in the peoples' genetics, languages, and cultures. Kayser, et al. proposed that, from this area, a very small group of people (speaking an Austronesian language) departed to the east to become the forebears of the Polynesian people.

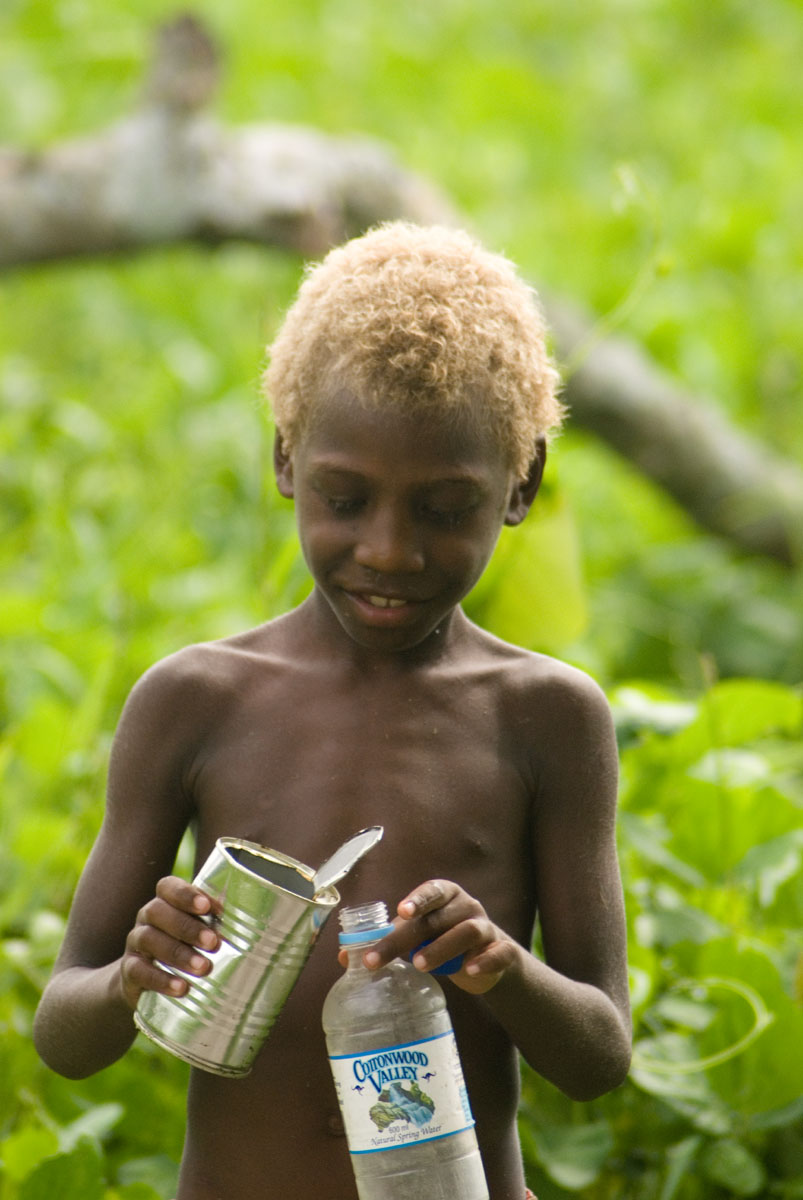
Boy from Vanuatu

However, the theory is contradicted by the findings of a genetic study published by Temple University in 2008; based on genome scans and evaluation of more than 800 genetic markers among a wide variety of Pacific peoples, it found that neither Polynesians nor Micronesians have much genetic relation to Melanesians. Both groups are strongly related genetically to East Asians, particularly Taiwanese aborigines. It appeared that, having developed their sailing outrigger canoes, the Polynesian ancestors migrated from East Asia, moved through the Melanesian area quickly on their way, and kept going to eastern areas, where they settled. They left little genetic evidence in Melanesia.

The study found a high rate of genetic differentiation and diversity among the groups living within the Melanesian islands, with the peoples distinguished by island, language, topography, and geography among the islands. Such diversity developed over their tens of thousands of years of settlement before the Polynesian ancestors ever arrived at the islands. For instance, populations developed differently in coastal areas, as opposed to those in more isolated mountainous valleys.

Additional DNA analysis has taken research into new directions, as more human species have been discovered since the late 20th century. Based on his genetic studies of the Denisova hominin, an ancient human species discovered in 2010, Svante Pääbo claims that ancient human ancestors of the Melanesians interbred in Asia with these humans. He has found that people of New Guinea share 4–6% of their genome with the Denisovans, indicating this exchange. The Denisovans are considered cousin to the Neanderthals; both groups are now understood to have migrated out of Africa, with the Neanderthals going into Europe, and the Denisovans heading east about 400,000 years ago. This is based on genetic evidence from a fossil found in Siberia. The evidence from Melanesia suggests their territory extended into south Asia, where ancestors of the Melanesians developed.

Melanesians of some islands are one of the few non-European peoples, and the only dark-skinned group of people outside Australia, known to have blond hair.

=== Micronesia ===
Micronesia began to be settled several millennia ago, although there are competing theories about the origin and arrival of the first settlers. There are numerous difficulties with conducting archaeological excavations in the islands, due to their size, settlement patterns and storm damage. As a result, much evidence is based on linguistic analysis. The earliest archaeological traces of civilization have been found on the island of Saipan, dated to 1500 BCE or slightly before.

The ancestors of the Micronesians settled there over 4,000 years ago. A decentralized chieftain-based system eventually evolved into a more centralized economic and religious culture centered on Yap and Pohnpei. The prehistory of many Micronesian islands such as Yap are not known very well.

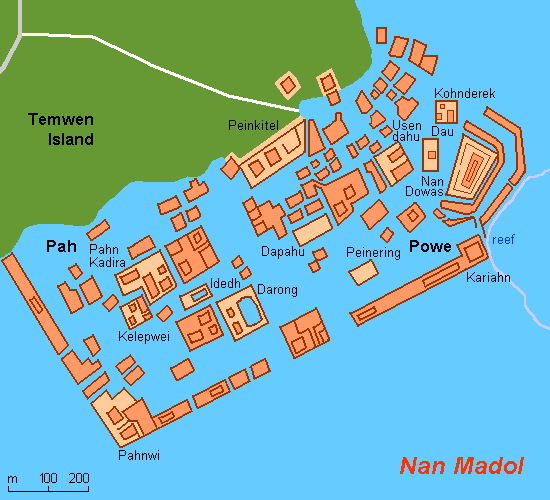
Central Nan Madol

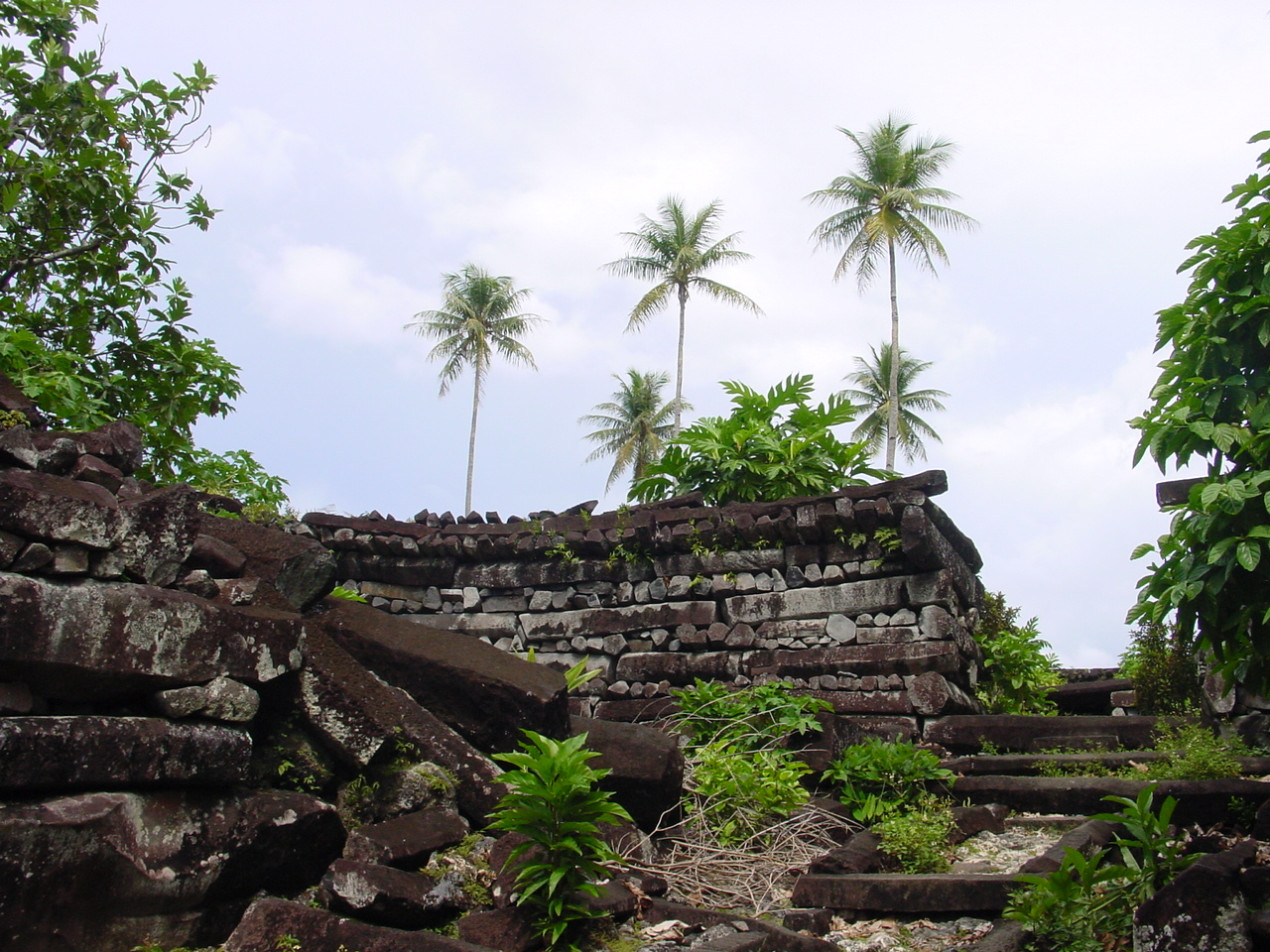
Nan Madol, capital of the Saudeleur dynasty

On Pohnpei, pre-colonial history is divided into three eras: Mwehin Kawa or Mwehin Aramas (Period of Building, or Period of Peopling, before c. 1100); Mwehin Sau Deleur (Period of the Lord of Deleur, c. 1100 to c. 1628); (Note: The Saudeleur era lasted around 500 years. Legend generally dates their downfall to the 1500s, however archaeologists date Saudeleur ruins to c. 1628.) and Mwehin Nahnmwarki (Period of the Nahnmwarki, c. 1628 to c. 1885). Pohnpeian legend recounts that the Saudeleur rulers, the first to bring government to Pohnpei, were of foreign origin. The Saudeleur centralized form of absolute rule is characterized in Pohnpeian legend as becoming increasingly oppressive over several generations. Arbitrary and onerous demands, as well as a reputation for offending Pohnpeian deities, sowed resentment among Pohnpeians. The Saudeleur Dynasty ended with the invasion of Isokelekel, another semi-mythical foreigner, who replaced the Saudeleur rule with the more decentralized nahnmwarki system in existence today. Isokelekel is regarded as the creator of the modern Pohnpeian nahnmwarki social system and the father of the Pompeian people.

Construction of Nan Madol, a megalithic complex made from basalt lava logs in Pohnpei began as early as 1200 CE. Nan Madol is offshore of Temwen Island near Pohnpei, consists of a series of small artificial islands linked by a network of canals, and is often called the Venice of the Pacific. It is located near the island of Pohnpei and was the ceremonial and political seat of the Saudeleur dynasty that united Pohnpei's estimated 25,000 people until its centralized system collapsed amid the invasion of Isokelekel. Isokelekel and his descendants initially occupied the stone city, but later abandoned it.

The first people of the Northern Mariana Islands navigated to the islands at some period between 4000 BCE to 2000 BCE from Southeast Asia. They became known as the Chamorros, and spoke an Austronesian language called Chamorro. The ancient Chamorro left a number of megalithic ruins, including Latte stone. The Refaluwasch or Carolinian people came to the Marianas in the 1800s from the Caroline Islands. Micronesian colonists gradually settled the Marshall Islands during the 2nd millennium BCE, with inter-island navigation made possible using traditional stick charts.

=== Polynesia ===
Linguistic, archaeological, and human genetic evidence identifies the Polynesians as a subset of the sea-migrating Austronesian peoples, and tracing Polynesian languages places their prehistoric origins in the Malay Archipelago, and ultimately, in Taiwan. Between about 3000 and 1000 BCE speakers of Austronesian languages began spreading from Taiwan into Maritime Southeast Asia, as tribes thought to have travelled via South China about 8,000 years ago to the edges of western Micronesia and on into Melanesia, although they differ from the Han Chinese who now comprise the majority of people in China and Taiwan. There are three theories regarding the prehistoric spread of humans across the Pacific to Polynesia. Kayser et al. (2000) outline these well:

- Express Train model: A recent (c. 3000–1000 BCE) expansion out of Taiwan, via the Philippines and eastern Indonesia and from the north-west ("Bird's Head") of New Guinea, on to Island Melanesia by roughly 1400 BCE, reaching western Polynesian islands about 900 BCE. This theory is supported by the majority of current human genetic data, linguistic data, and archaeological data
- Entangled Bank model: Emphasizes the long history of Austronesian speakers' cultural and genetic interactions with indigenous Island South-East Asians and Melanesians along the way to becoming the first Polynesians.
- Slow Boat model: Similar to the express-train model but with a longer hiatus in Melanesia along with admixture (genetically, culturally and linguistically) with the local population. This is supported by the Y-chromosome data of Kayser et al. (2000), which shows that all three haplotypes of Polynesian Y chromosomes can be traced back to Melanesia.

In the archaeological record there are well-defined traces of this expansion, allowing researchers to follow and date the path it took with some certainty. It is thought that by roughly 1400 BCE, "Lapita peoples" (so-named after their pottery tradition) appeared in the Bismarck Archipelago of northwest Melanesia. This culture is seen as having adapted and evolved through time and space since its emergence "Out of Taiwan". The Lapita people had given up rice production, for instance, after encountering and adapting to breadfruit in the Bird's Head area of New Guinea. In the end, the most eastern site for Lapita archaeological remains recovered so far has been through work on the archaeology in Samoa. The site is at Mulifanua on Upolu. The Mulifanua site, where 4,288 pottery shards have been found and studied, has a "true" age of c. 1000 BCE based on C14 dating. A 2010 study places the beginning of the human archaeological sequences of Polynesia in Tonga at 900 BCE, the small differences in dates with Samoa being due to differences in radiocarbon-dating technologies between 1989 and 2010, the Tongan site apparently predating the Samoan site by some few decades in real time.

Within a mere three or four centuries between about 1300 and 900 BCE, the Lapita archaeological culture spread 6,000 kilometres eastwards from the Bismarck Archipelago, until it reached as far as Fiji, Tonga, and Samoa. The area of Tonga, Fiji, and Samoa served as a gateway into the rest of the Pacific region now known as Polynesia. Ancient Tongan mythologies, as recorded by early European explorers, report the islands of 'Ata and Tongatapu as the first islands hauled to the surface from the deep ocean by Maui.

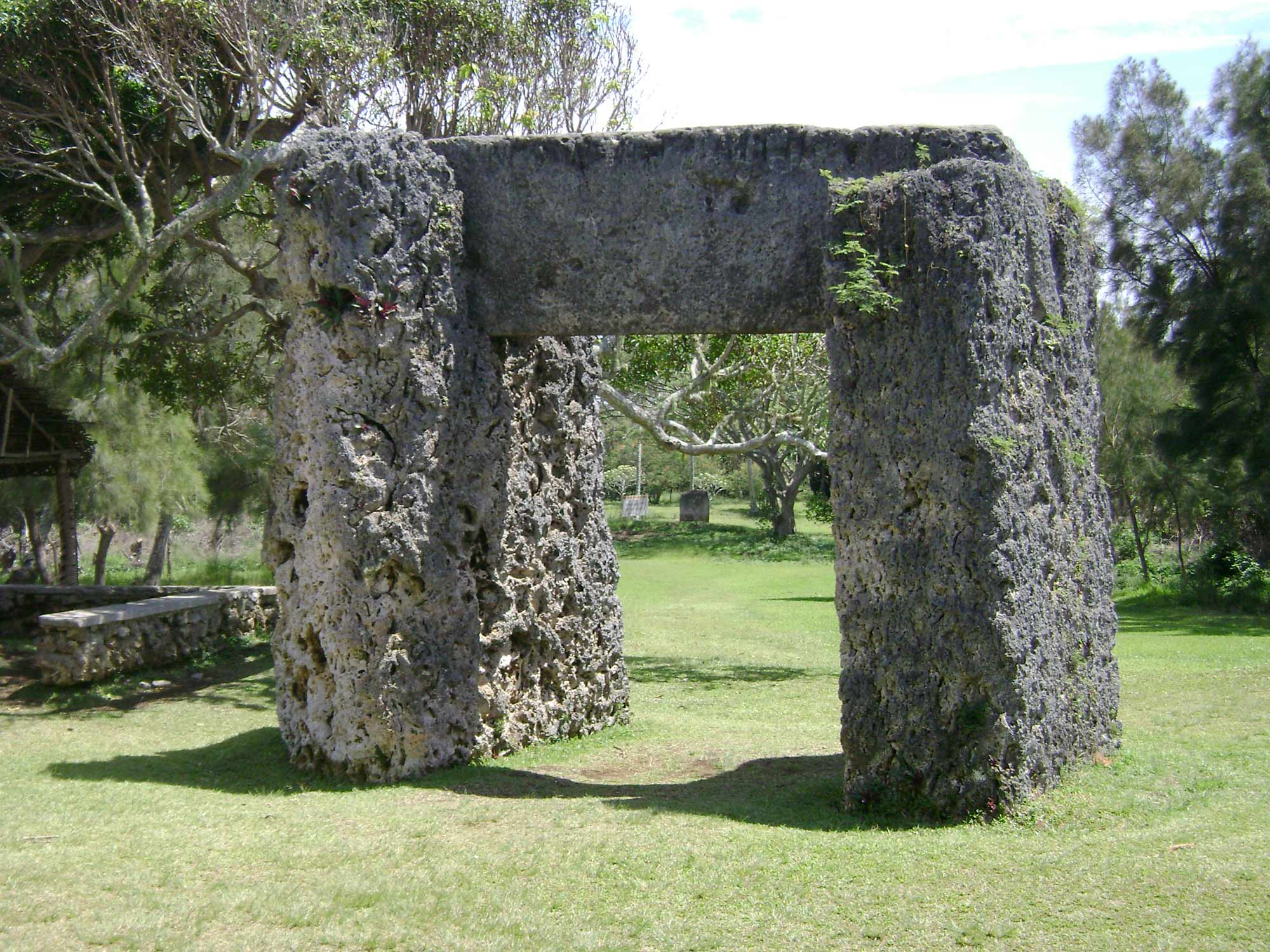
Haʻamonga ʻa Maui, a stone trilithon on the Tongan island of Tongatapu, constructed of three coral limestone slabs each weighing at least 30–40 tons It was built at the beginning of the 13th century under the 11th Tuʻi Tonga Tuʻi-tā-tui.

The "Tuʻi Tonga Empire" or "Tongan Empire" in Oceania are descriptions sometimes given to Tongan expansionism and projected hegemony dating back to 950 CE, but at its peak during the period 1200–1500. While modern researchers and cultural experts attest to widespread Tongan influence and evidences of transoceanic trade and exchange of material and non-material cultural artifacts, empirical evidence of a "political" empire ruled for any length of time by successive rulers is lacking.

Modern archeology, anthropology and linguistic studies confirm widespread Tongan cultural influence ranging widely through East 'Uvea, Rotuma, Futuna, Samoa and Niue, parts of Micronesia (Kiribati, Pohnpei), Vanuatu, and New Caledonia and the Loyalty Islands, and while some academics prefer the term "maritime chiefdom", others argue that, while very different from examples elsewhere, ..."empire" is probably the most convenient term.

Pottery art from Fijian towns shows that Fiji was settled before or around 3500 to 1000 BC, although the details of Pacific migration remain vague. It is believed that the Lapita people or the ancestors of the Polynesians settled the islands first but not much is known of what became of them after the Melanesians arrived; they may have had some influence on the new culture, and archaeological evidence shows that Polynesians would have then moved on to Tonga, Samoa, and even Hawai'i.

The first settlements in Fiji were started by voyaging traders and settlers from the west about 5000 years ago. Lapita pottery shards have been found at numerous excavations around the country. Aspects of Fijian culture are similar to the Melanesian culture of the western Pacific but have a stronger connection to the older Polynesian cultures. Stretching across 1,000 kilometres (620 mi) from east to west, Fiji has been a nation of many languages. Fiji's history was one of settlement but also of mobility.

Over the centuries, a unique Fijian culture developed. Constant warfare and cannibalism between warring tribes were quite rampant and very much part of everyday life. In later centuries, the reputation of the cannibal lifestyle deterred European sailors from going near Fijian waters, and Fiji acquired the name Cannibal Isles; as a result, Fiji remained unknown to the rest of the world.

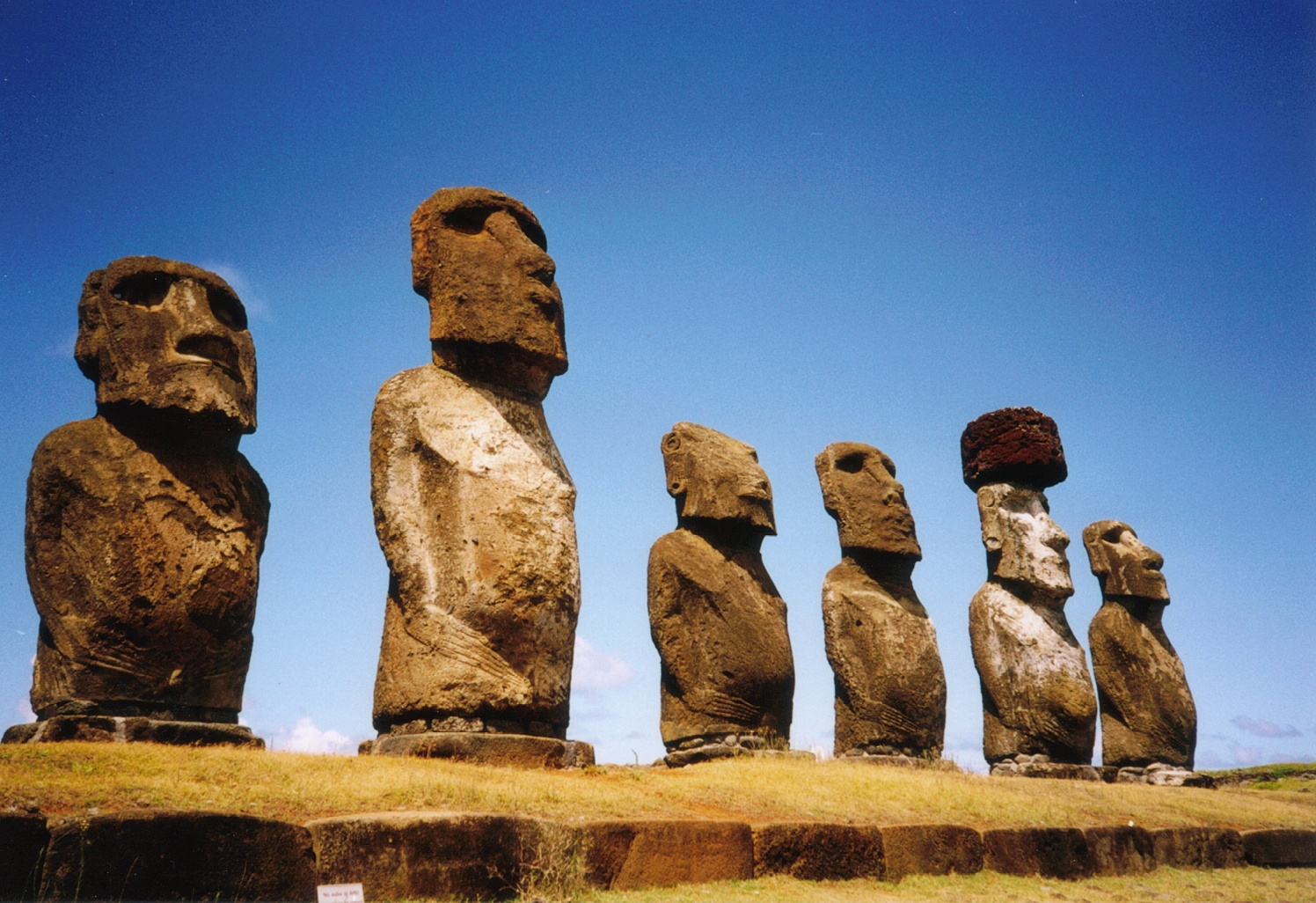
Moai at Ahu Tongariki on Rapa Nui (Easter Island)

Early European visitors to Easter Island recorded local oral traditions about the original settlers. In these traditions, Easter Islanders claimed that a chief Hotu Matuꞌa arrived on the island in one or two large canoes with his wife and extended family. They are believed to have been Polynesian. There is considerable uncertainty about the accuracy of this legend as well as about the date of settlement. Published literature suggests the island was settled around 300–400 CE, or at about the time of the arrival of the earliest settlers in Hawaii.

Some scientists say that Easter Island was not inhabited until 700–800 CE. This date-range is based on glottochronological calculations and on three radiocarbon dates from charcoal that appears to have been produced during forest-clearance activities.

Moreover, a recent study which included radiocarbon dates from what is thought to be very early material suggests that the island was settled as recently as 1200 CE. This seems to be supported by a 2006 study of the island's deforestation, which could have started around the same time. A large, now extinct, palm, Paschalococos disperta (related to the Chilean wine palm (Jubaea chilensis)), was one of the dominant trees as attested by fossil evidence; this species, unique to Easter Island, became extinct due to deforestation by the early Polynesian settlers.

== European contact and exploration (1500s–1700s) ==
=== Iberian pioneers ===
==== Early Iberian exploration ====
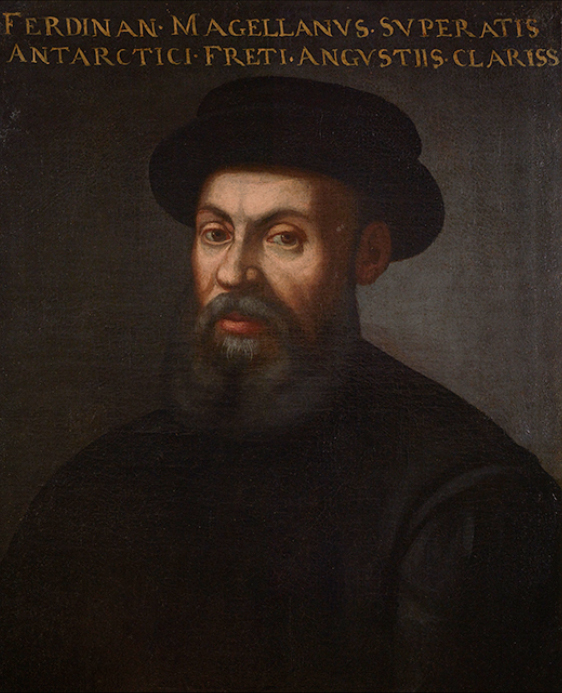
Ferdinand Magellan

The Magellan–Elcano voyage. Victoria, one of the original five ships, circumnavigated the globe after the death of Ferdinand Magellan.

Oceania was first explored by Europeans from the 16th century onwards. Portuguese navigators, between 1512 and 1526, reached the Moluccas (by António de Abreu and Francisco Serrão in 1512), Timor, the Aru Islands (Martim A. Melo Coutinho), the Tanimbar Islands, some of the Caroline Islands (by Gomes de Sequeira in 1525), and west Papua New Guinea (by Jorge de Menezes in 1526). In 1519 a Castilian ('Spanish') expedition led by Ferdinand Magellan sailed down the east coast of South America, found and sailed through the strait that bears his name and on 28 November 1520 entered the ocean which he named "Pacific". The three remaining ships, led by Magellan and his captains Duarte Barbosa and João Serrão, then sailed north and caught the trade winds which carried them across the Pacific to the Philippines where Magellan was killed. One surviving ship led by Juan Sebastián Elcano returned west across the Indian Ocean and the other went north in the hope of finding the westerlies and reaching Mexico. Unable to find the right winds, it was forced to return to the East Indies. The Magellan-Elcano expedition achieved the first circumnavigation of the world and reached the Philippines, the Mariana Islands, and other islands of Oceania.

==== Other large expeditions ====
From 1527 to 1595 a number of other large Spanish expeditions crossed the Pacific Ocean, leading to the discovery of the Marshall Islands and Palau in the North Pacific, as well as Tuvalu, the Marquesas, the Solomon Islands archipelago, the Cook Islands and the Admiralty Islands in the South Pacific.

In 1565, Spanish navigator Andrés de Urdaneta found a wind system that would allow ships to sail eastward from Asia, back to the Americas. From then until 1815 the annual Manila galleons crossed the Pacific from Mexico to the Philippines and back, in the first transpacific trade route in history. Combined with the Spanish Atlantic or West Indies Fleet, the Manila galleons formed one of the first global maritime exchange in human history, linking Seville in Spain with Manila in the Philippines, via Mexico.

Later, in the quest for Terra Australis, Spanish explorers in the 17th century discovered the Pitcairn and Vanuatu archipelagos, and sailed the Torres Strait between Australia and New Guinea, named after navigator Luís Vaz de Torres. In 1668, the Spaniards founded a colony on Guam as a resting place for west-bound galleons. For a long time this was the only non-coastal European settlement in the Pacific.

=== Oceania during the Golden Age of Dutch exploration and discovery ===
Regions of Oceania (including Australasia, Polynesia, Micronesia, and Melanesia). "The Island Continent" Australia was the last human-inhabited continent to be largely known to the civilized world.

==== Early Dutch exploration ====
The Dutch were the first non-natives to undisputedly explore and chart coastlines of Australia, Tasmania, New Zealand, Tonga, Fiji, Samoa, and Easter Island. Verenigde Oostindische Compagnie (or VOC) was a major force behind the Golden Age of Dutch exploration (category; c. 1590s–1720s) and Netherlandish cartography (c. 1570s–1670s). In the 17th century, the VOC's navigators and explorers charted almost three-quarters of the Australian coastline, except the east coast.

==== Abel Tasman's exploratory voyages ====
Abel Tasman was the first known European explorer to reach the islands of Van Diemen's Land (now Tasmania) and New Zealand, and to sight the Fiji islands. His navigator François Visscher, and his merchant Isaack Gilsemans, mapped substantial portions of Australia, New Zealand, Tonga and the Fijian islands.

On 24 November 1642 Abel Tasman sighted the west coast of Tasmania, north of Macquarie Harbour. He named his discovery Van Diemen's Land after Antonio van Diemen, Governor-General of the Dutch East Indies. then claimed formal possession of the land on 3 December 1642.

After some exploration, Tasman had intended to proceed in a northerly direction but as the wind was unfavourable he steered east. On 13 December they sighted land on the north-west coast of the South Island, New Zealand, becoming the first Europeans to do so. Tasman named it Staten Landt on the assumption that it was connected to an island (Staten Island, Argentina) at the south of the tip of South America. Proceeding north and then east, he stopped to gather water, but one of his boats was attacked by Māori in a double hulled waka (canoes) and four of his men were attacked and killed by mere. As Tasman sailed out of the bay he was again attacked, this time by 11 waka. The waka approached the Zeehan which fired and hit one Māori who fell down. Canister shot hit the side of a waka.

Archeological research has shown the Dutch had tried to land at a major agricultural area, which the Māori may have been trying to protect. Tasman named the bay Murderers' Bay (now known as Golden Bay) and sailed north, but mistook Cook Strait for a bight (naming it Zeehaen's Bight). Two names he gave to New Zealand landmarks still endure, Cape Maria van Diemen and Three Kings Islands, but Kaap Pieter Boreels was renamed by Cook 125 years later to Cape Egmont.

En route back to Batavia, Tasman came across the Tongan archipelago on 20 January 1643. While passing the Fiji islands, Tasman's ships came close to being wrecked on the dangerous reefs of the northeastern part of the Fiji group. He charted the eastern tip of Vanua Levu and Cikobia before making his way back into the open sea. He eventually turned northwest to New Guinea, and arrived at Batavia on 15 June 1643. For over a century after Tasman's voyages, until the era of James Cook, Tasmania and New Zealand were not visited by Europeans—mainland Australia was visited, but usually only by accident.

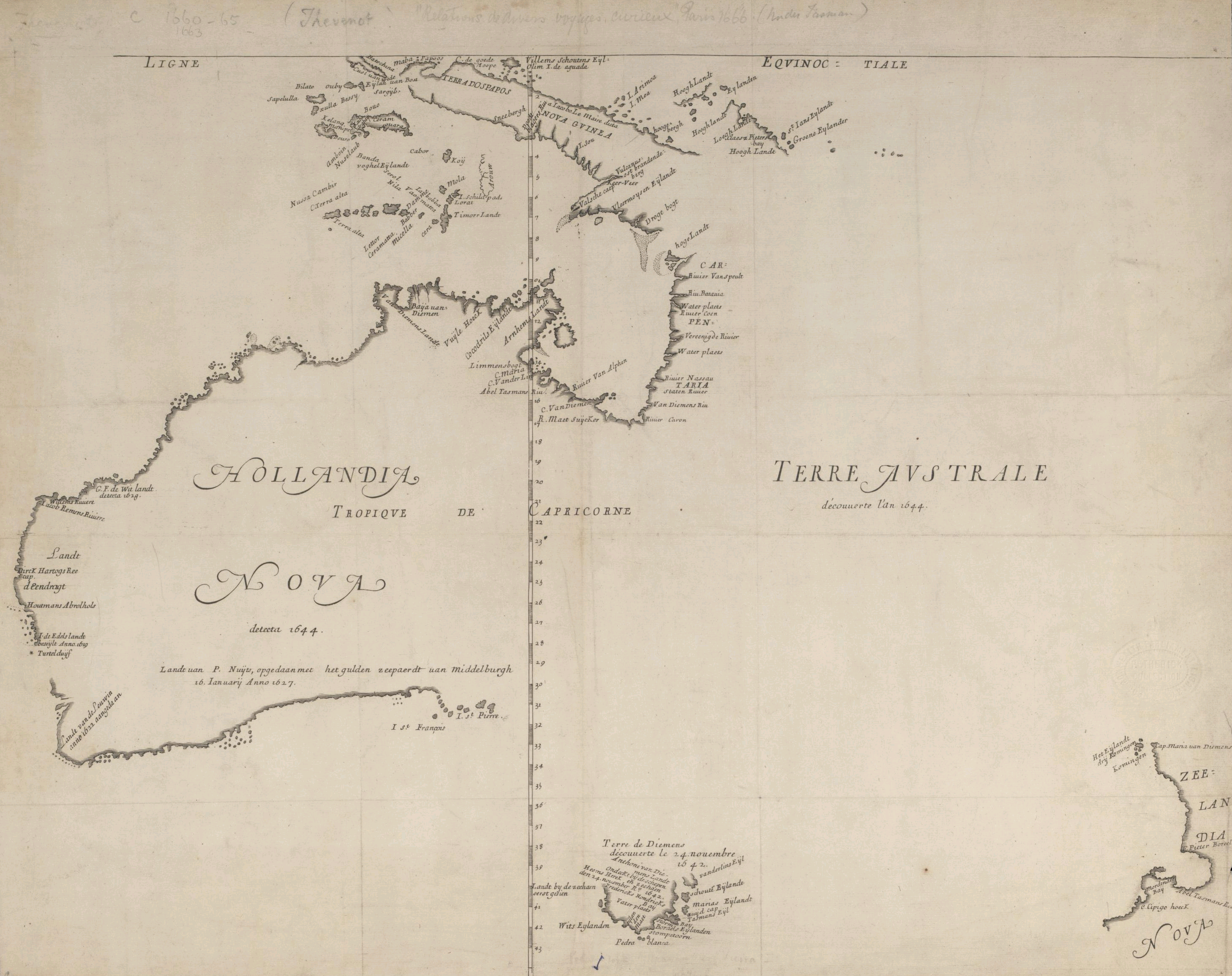
A typical map from the Golden Age of Netherlandish cartography. Australasia during the Golden Age of Dutch exploration and discovery (c. 1590s–1720s): including Nova Guinea (New Guinea), Nova Hollandia (mainland Australia), Van Diemen's Land (Tasmania), and Nova Zeelandia (New Zealand).

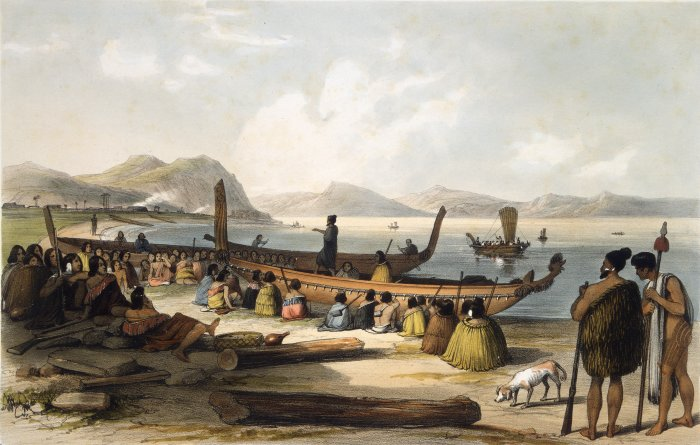
Waka taua (war canoes) at the Bay of Islands, 1827–1828.

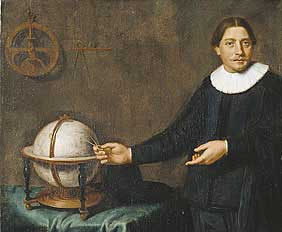
Abel Tasman.

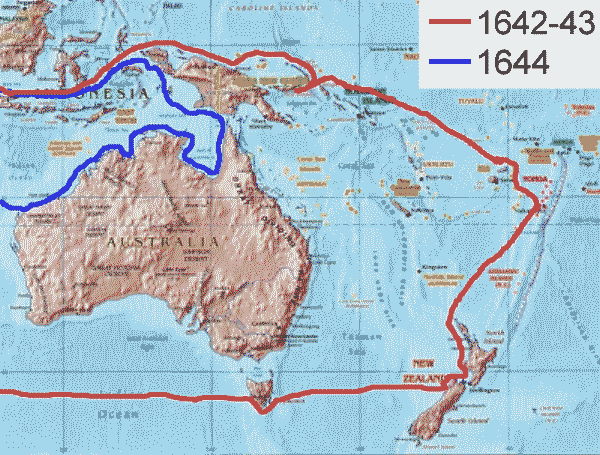
The route of Abel Tasman's first and second voyage

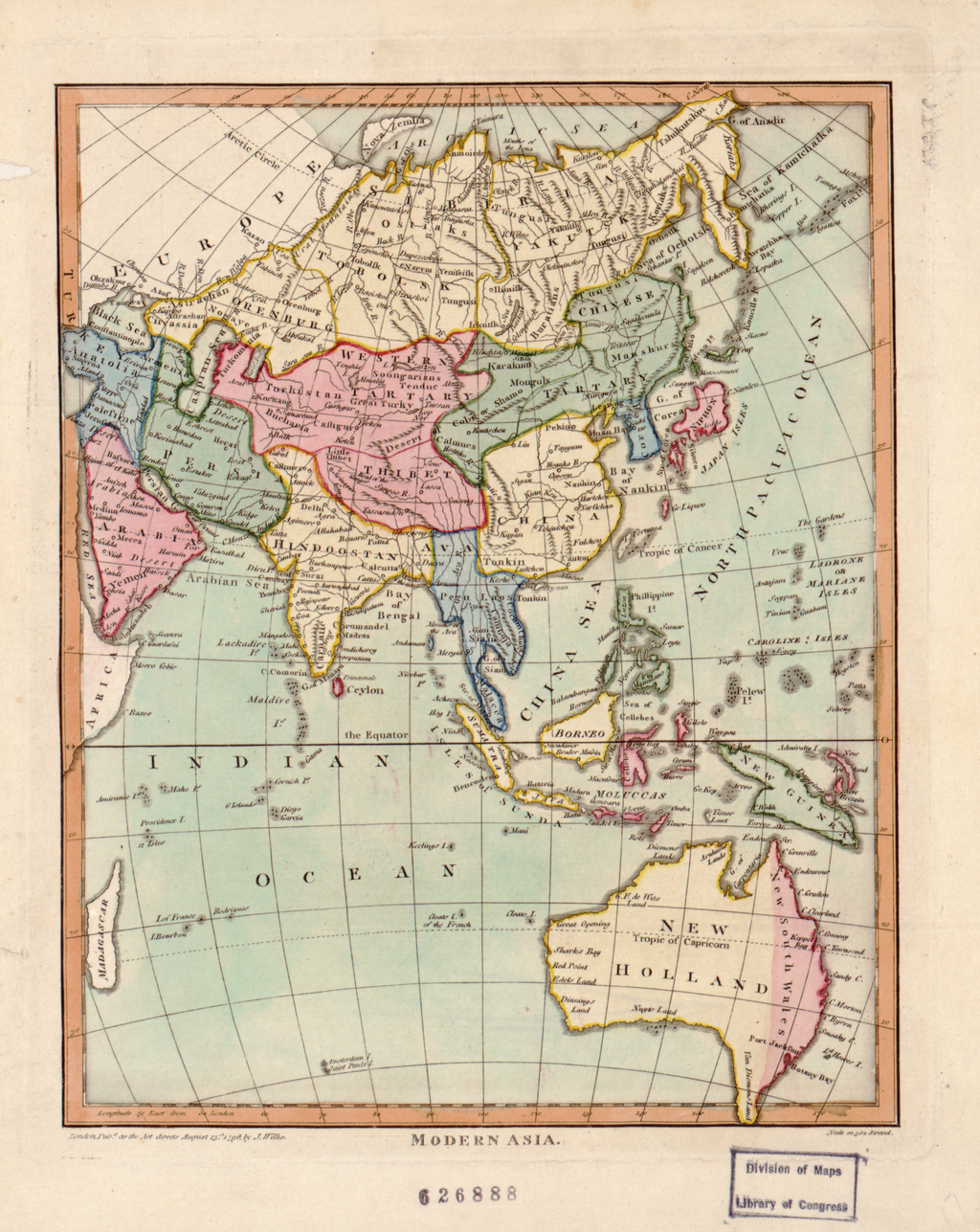
The continent of Australia (then known as New Holland) integrated within Asia in a 1796 map.

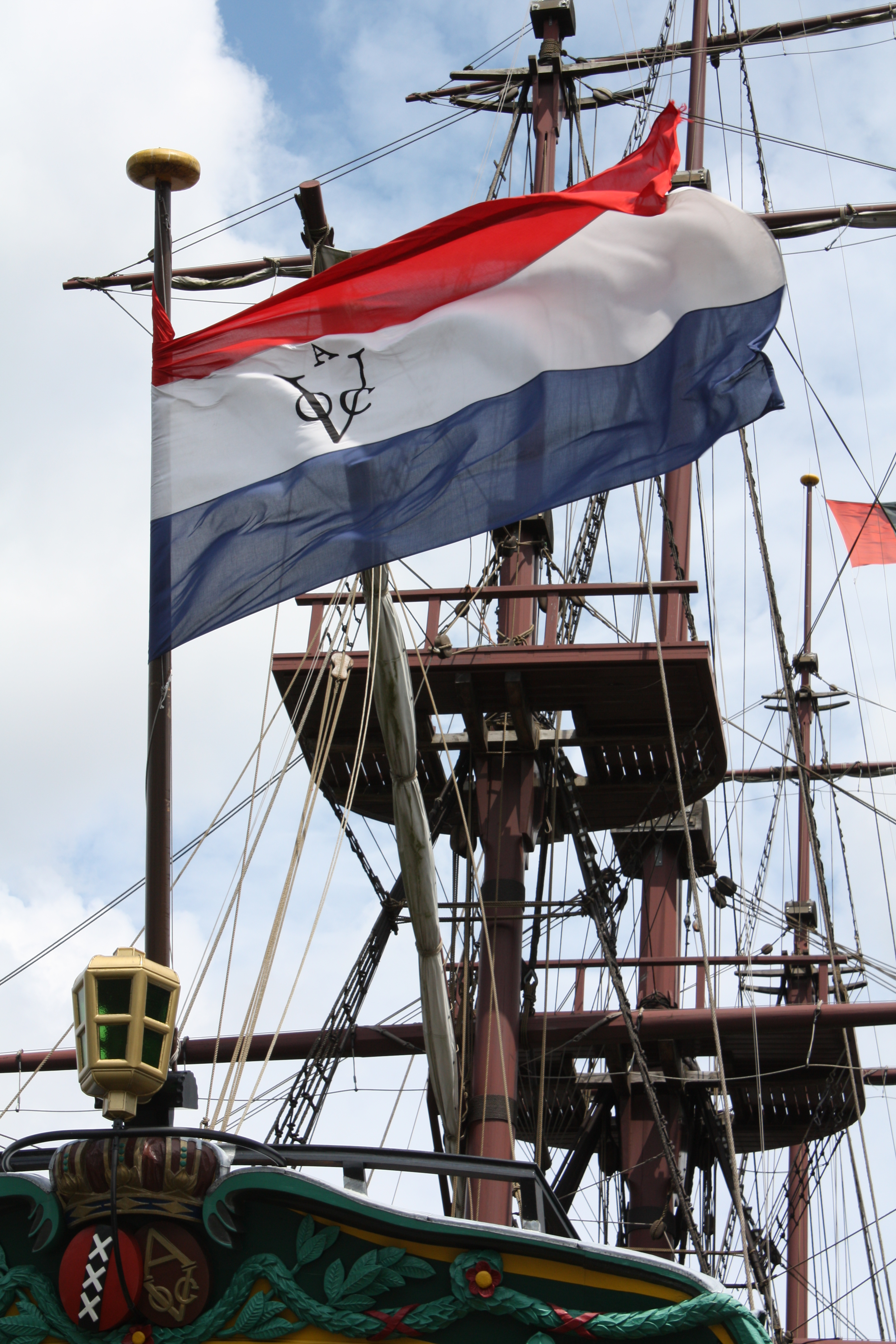
The Dutch East India Company
Map and drawings from Abel Tasman's voyages

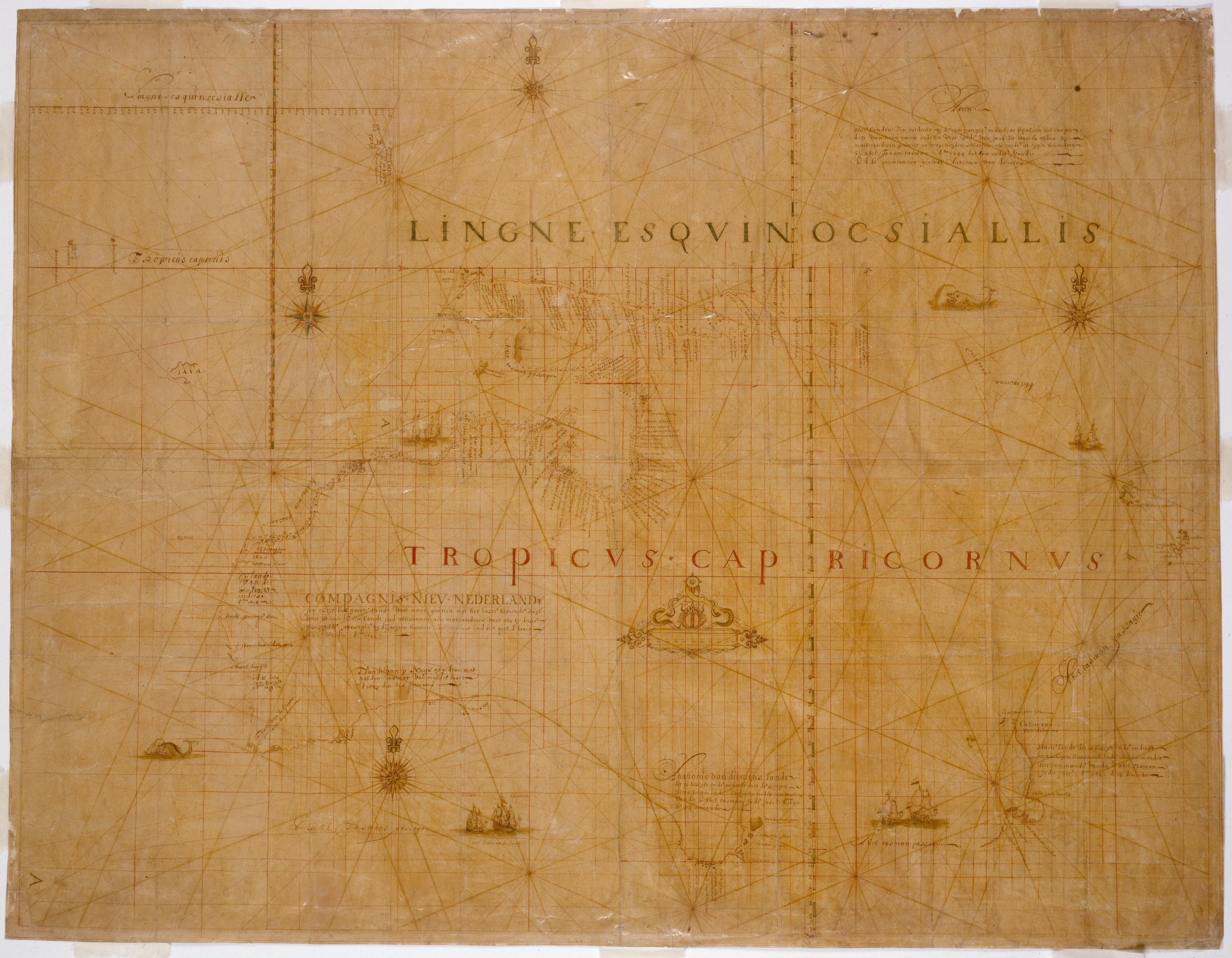
The Abel Tasman map 1644.

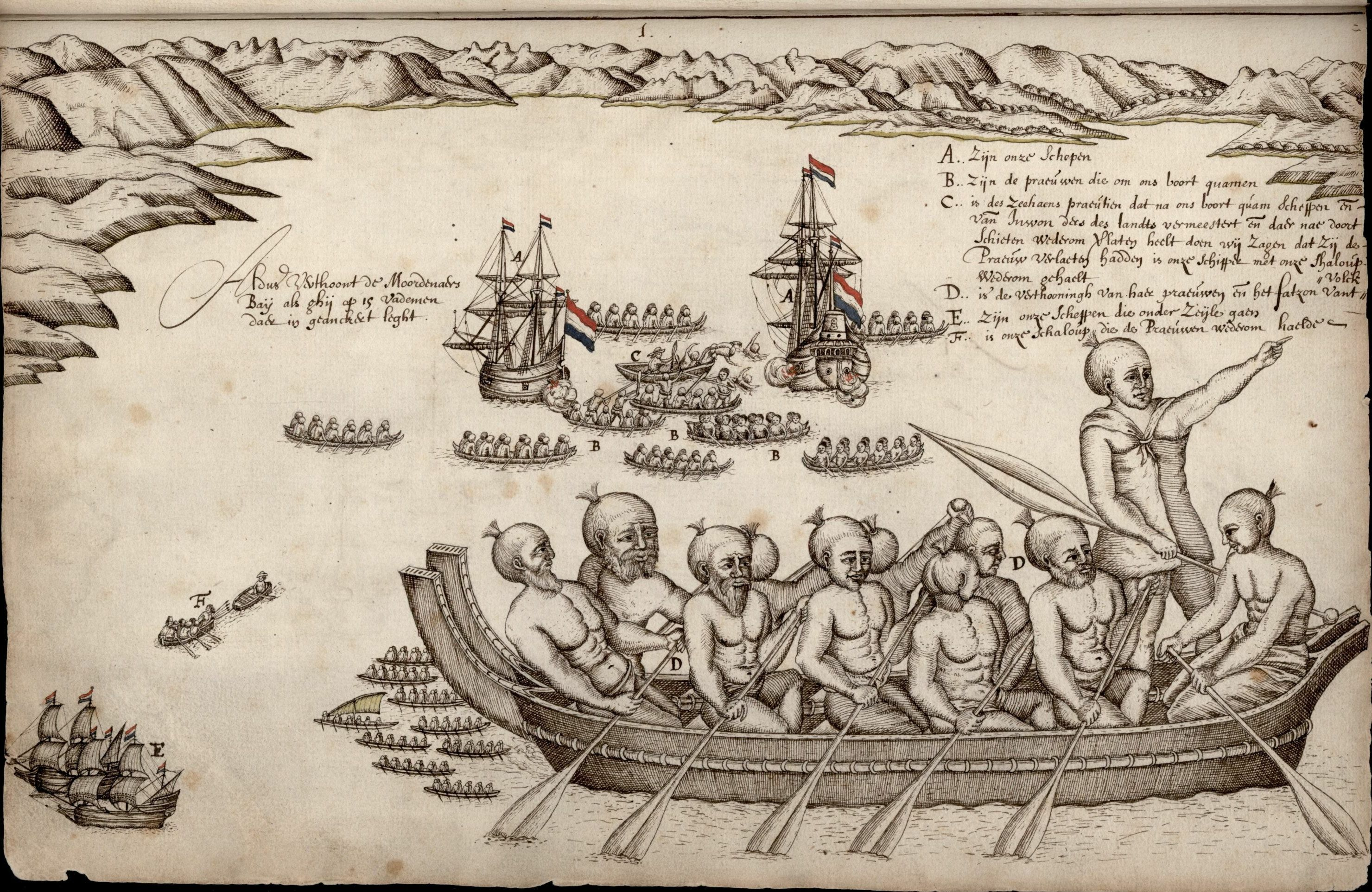
The first European impression of Māori, at Murderers' Bay. Drawing by Isaack Gilsemans in Abel Tasman's travel journal (1642).

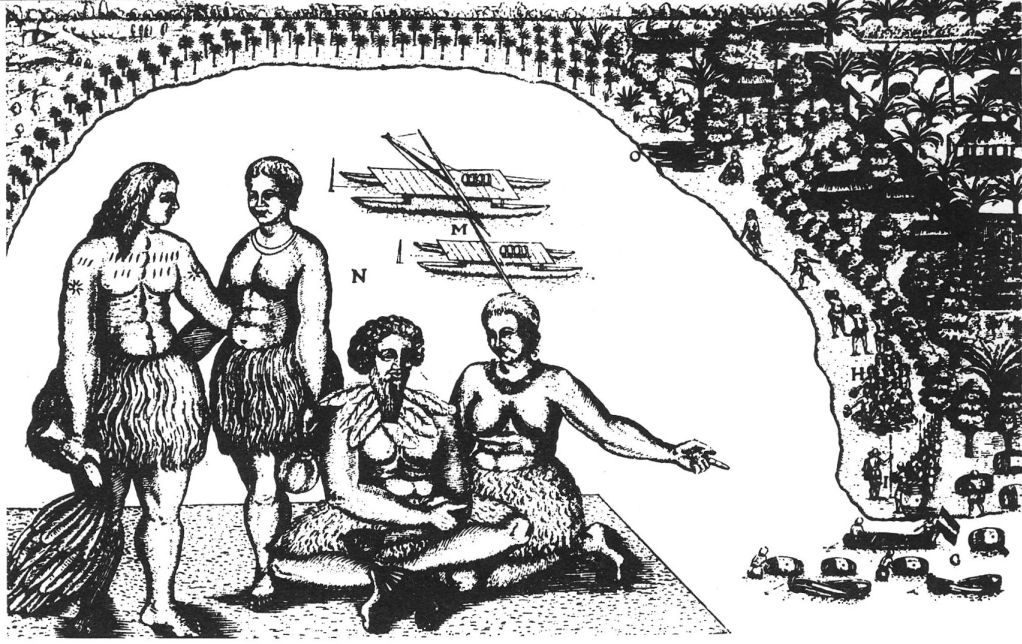
Tongatapu, drawing by Isaack Gilsemans

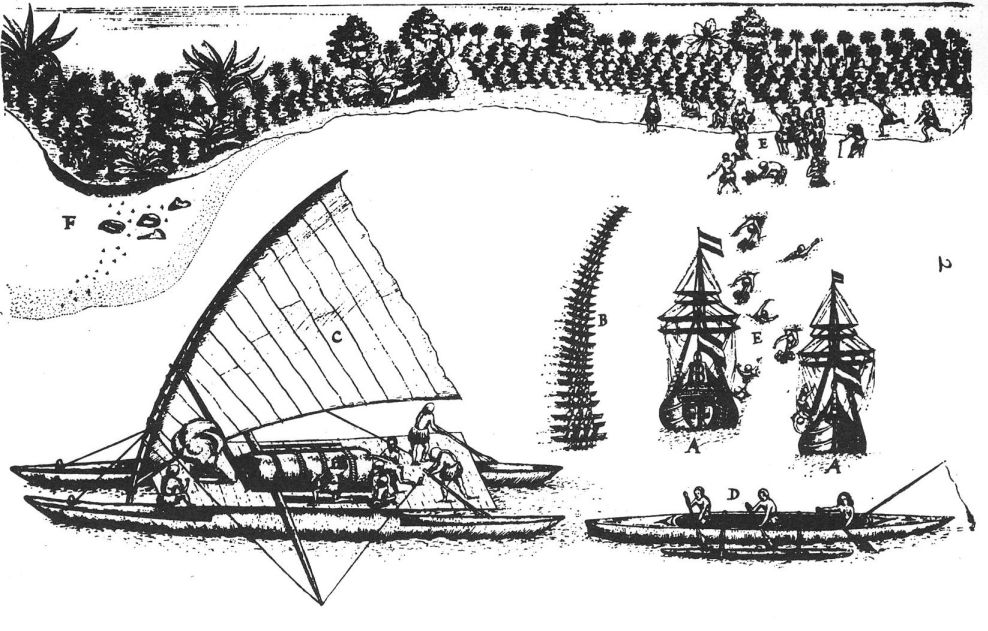
The bay of Tongatapu with the two ships, drawing by Isaack Gilsemans

=== British exploration and Captain James Cook's voyages ===
==== First voyage (1768–1771) ====
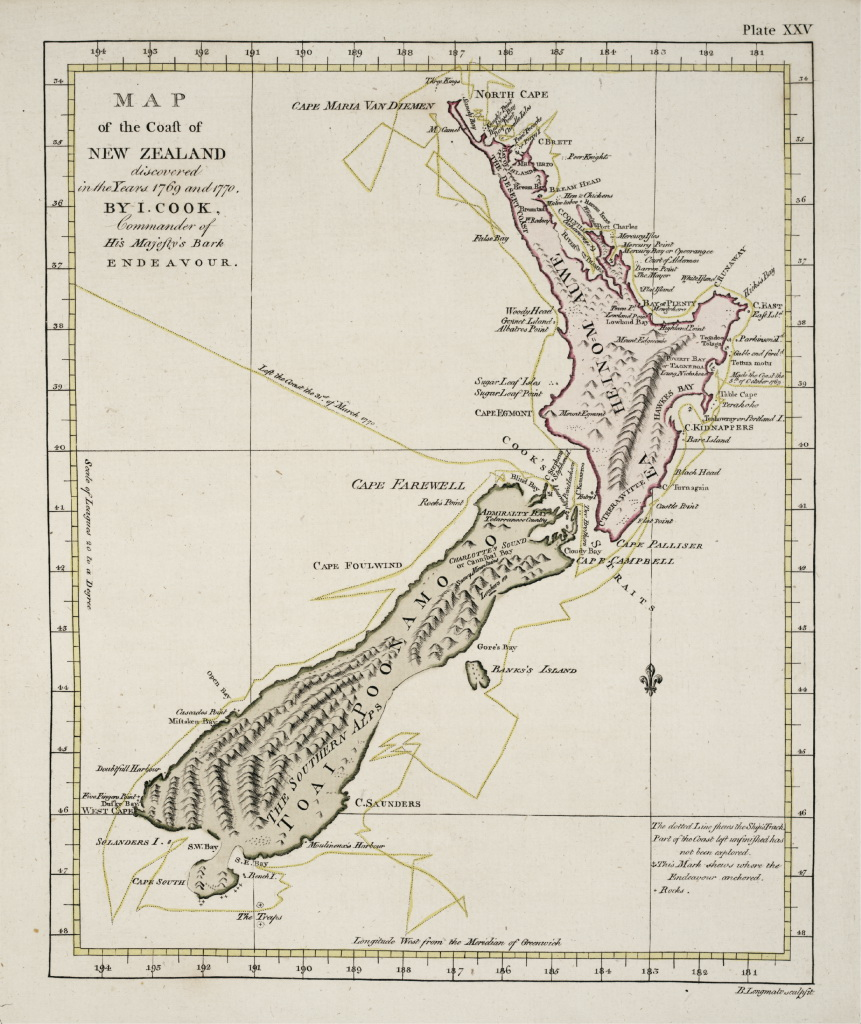
Cook's map of New Zealand

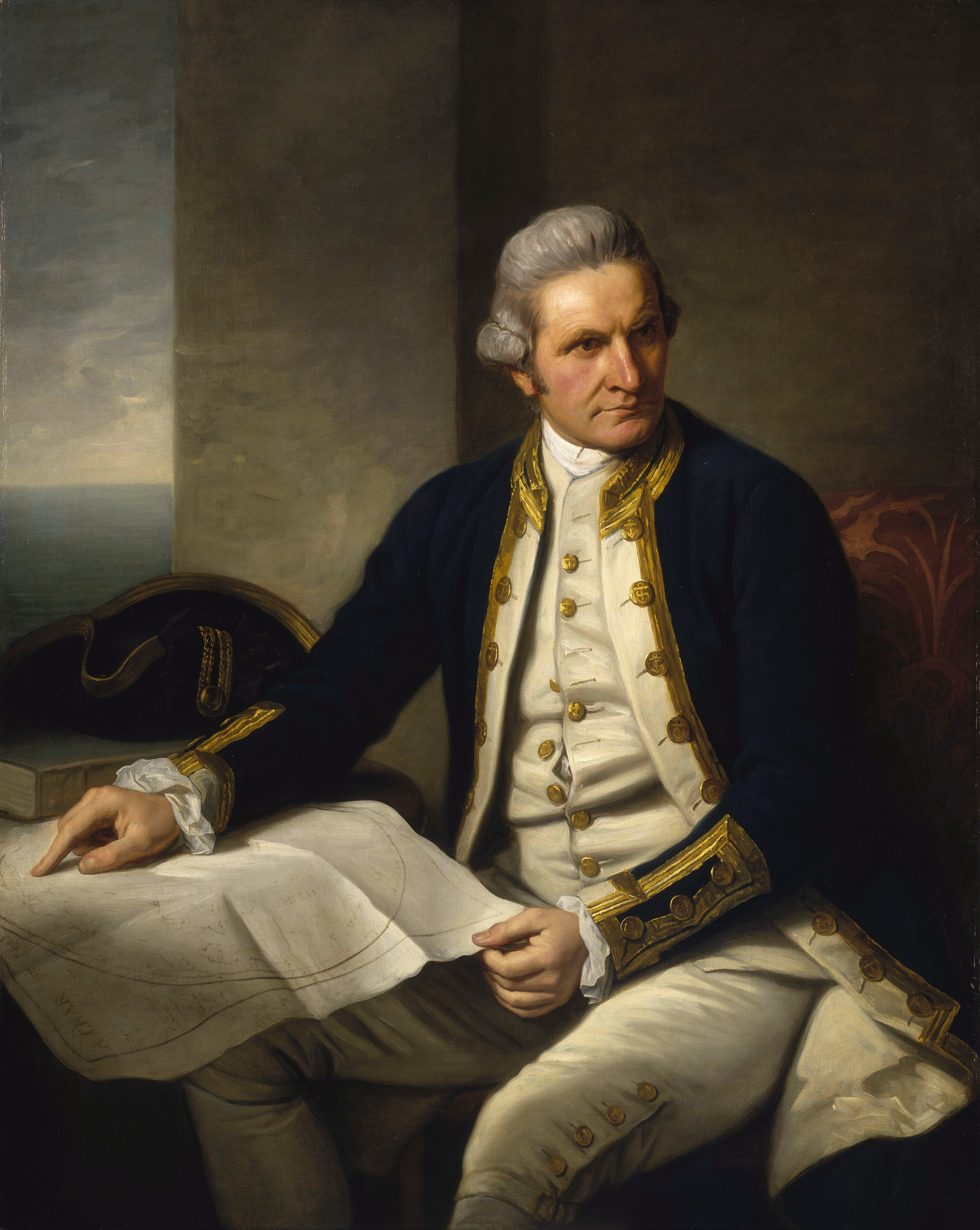
Portrait of James Cook by Nathaniel Dance-Holland, 1775.

In 1766, the Royal Society engaged James Cook to travel to the Pacific Ocean to observe and record the transit of Venus across the Sun. The expedition sailed from England on 26 August 1768, rounded Cape Horn and continued westward across the Pacific to arrive at Tahiti on 13 April 1769, where the observations of the Venus Transit were made. Once the observations were completed, Cook opened the sealed orders which were additional instructions from the Admiralty for the second part of his voyage: to search the south Pacific for signs of the postulated rich southern continent of Terra Australis.

With the help of a Tahitian named Tupaia, who had extensive knowledge of Pacific geography, Cook managed to reach New Zealand on 6 October 1769, leading only the second group of Europeans to do so (after Abel Tasman over a century earlier, in 1642). Cook mapped the complete New Zealand coastline, making only some minor errors (such as calling Banks Peninsula an island, and thinking Stewart Island / Rakiura was a peninsula of the South Island). He also identified Cook Strait, which separates the North Island from the South Island, and which Tasman had not seen.

Cook then voyaged west, reaching the south-eastern coast of Australia on 19 April 1770, and in doing so his expedition became the first recorded Europeans to have encountered its eastern coastline. (Note: At this time, the International Date Line had yet to be established, so the dates in Cook's journal are a day earlier than those accepted today.) On 23 April he made his first recorded direct observation of indigenous Australians at Brush Island near Bawley Point, noting in his journal: "…and were so near the Shore as to distinguish several people upon the Sea beach they appear'd to be of a very dark or black Colour but whether this was the real colour of their skins or the C[l]othes they might have on I know not." On 29 April Cook and crew made their first landfall on the mainland of the continent at a place now known as the Kurnell Peninsula. It is here that James Cook made first contact with an aboriginal tribe known as the Gweagal.

After his departure from Botany Bay he continued northwards. After a grounding mishap on the Great Barrier Reef, the voyage continued, sailing through Torres Strait before returning to England via Batavia, the Cape of Good Hope, and Saint Helena.

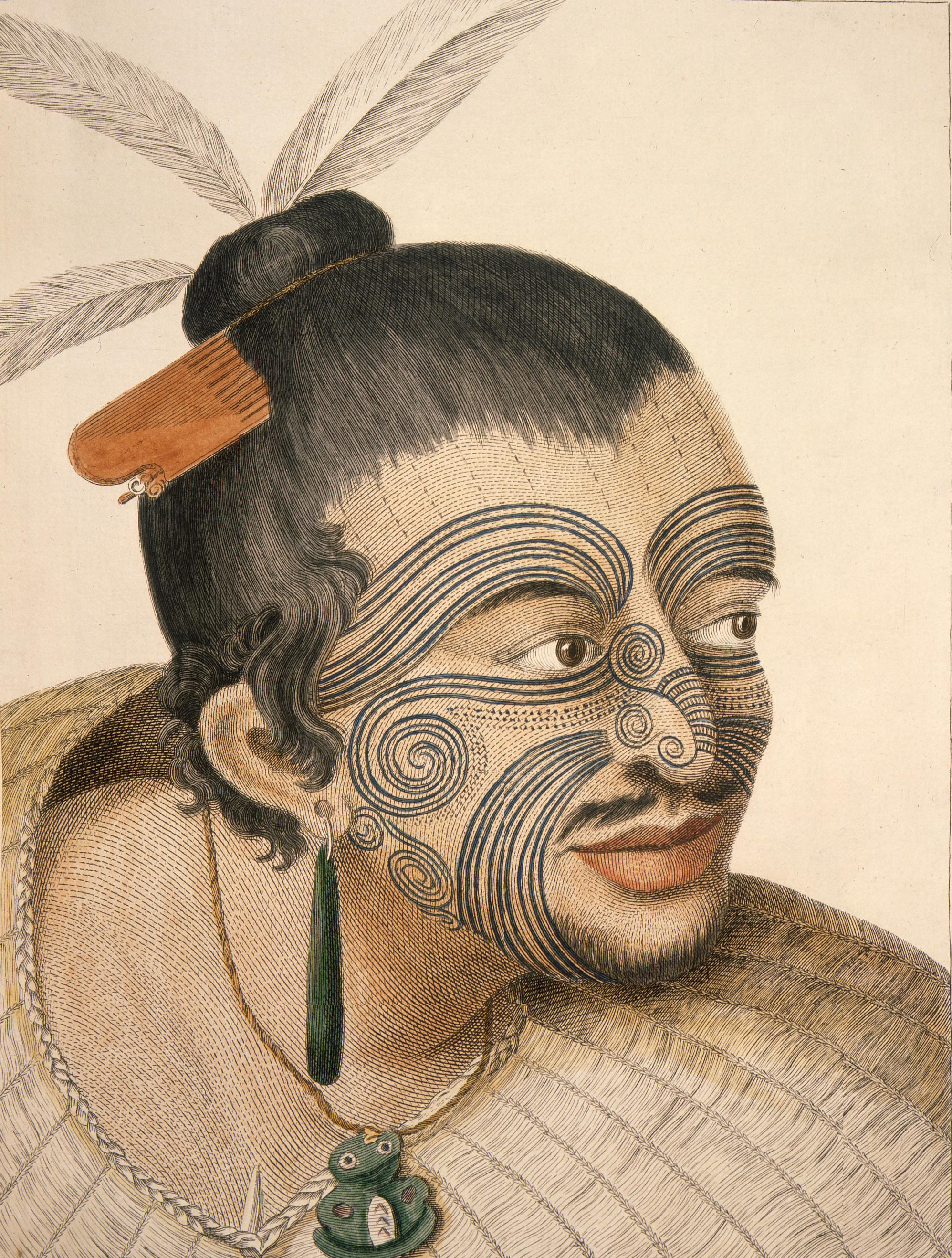
A Māori chief with tattoos (moko). Drawn by Sydney Parkinson, the artist on Captain Cook's 1st voyage to New Zealand in 1769.

==== Second voyage (1772–1775) ====
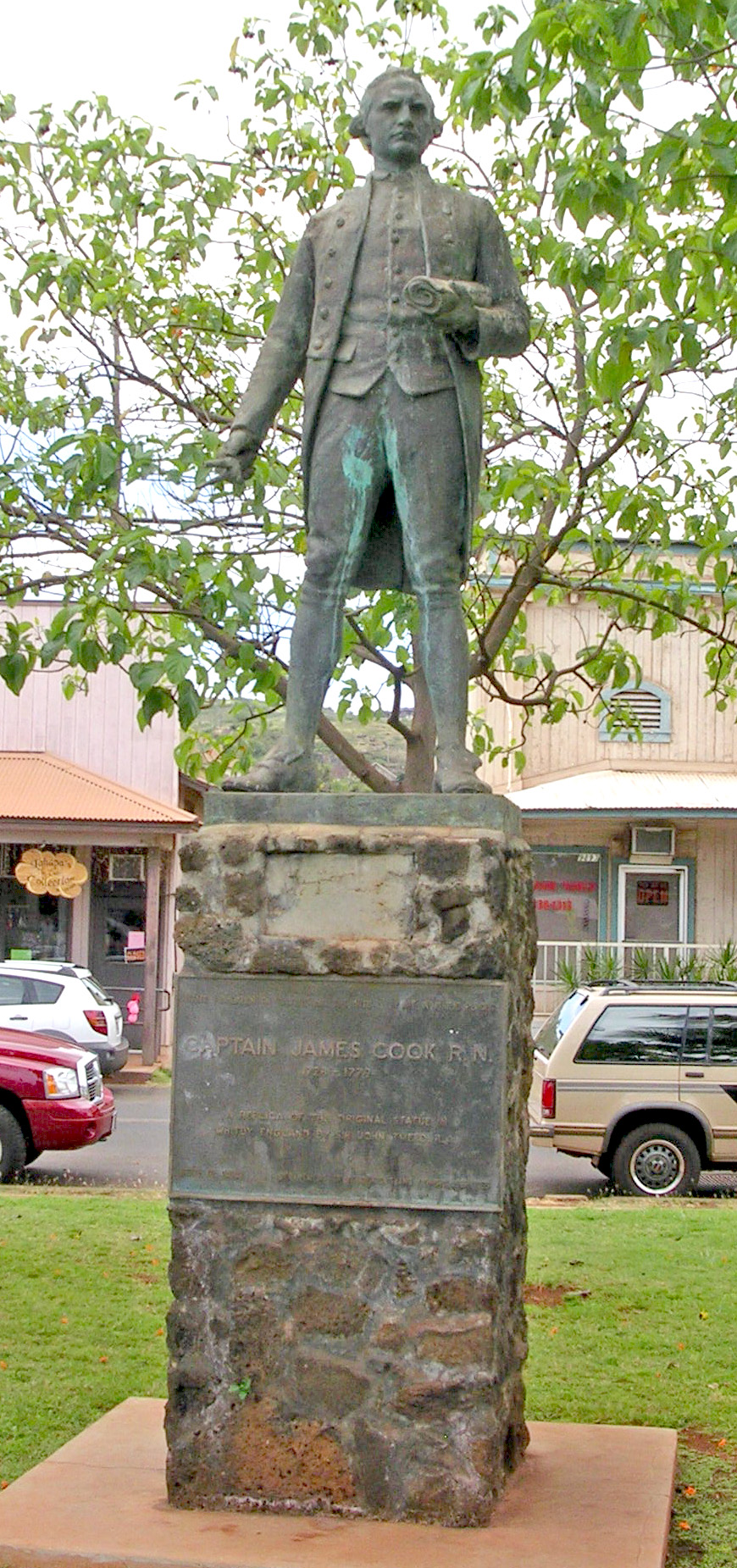
A statue of James Cook stands in Waimea, Kauaʻi commemorating his first contact with the Hawaiian Islands at the town's harbour in January 1778

In 1772 the Royal Society commissioned Cook to search for the hypothetical Terra Australis again. On his first voyage, Cook had demonstrated by circumnavigating New Zealand that it was not attached to a larger landmass to the south. Although he charted almost the entire eastern coastline of Australia, showing it to be continental in size, the Terra Australis was believed by the Royal Society to lie further south.

Cook commanded HMS Resolution on this voyage, while Tobias Furneaux commanded its companion ship, HMS Adventure. Cook's expedition circumnavigated the globe at an extreme southern latitude, becoming one of the first to cross the Antarctic Circle (17 January 1773). In the Antarctic fog, Resolution and Adventure became separated. Furneaux made his way to New Zealand, where he lost some of his men during an encounter with Māori, and eventually sailed back to Britain, while Cook continued to explore the Antarctic, reaching 71°10'S on 31 January 1774.

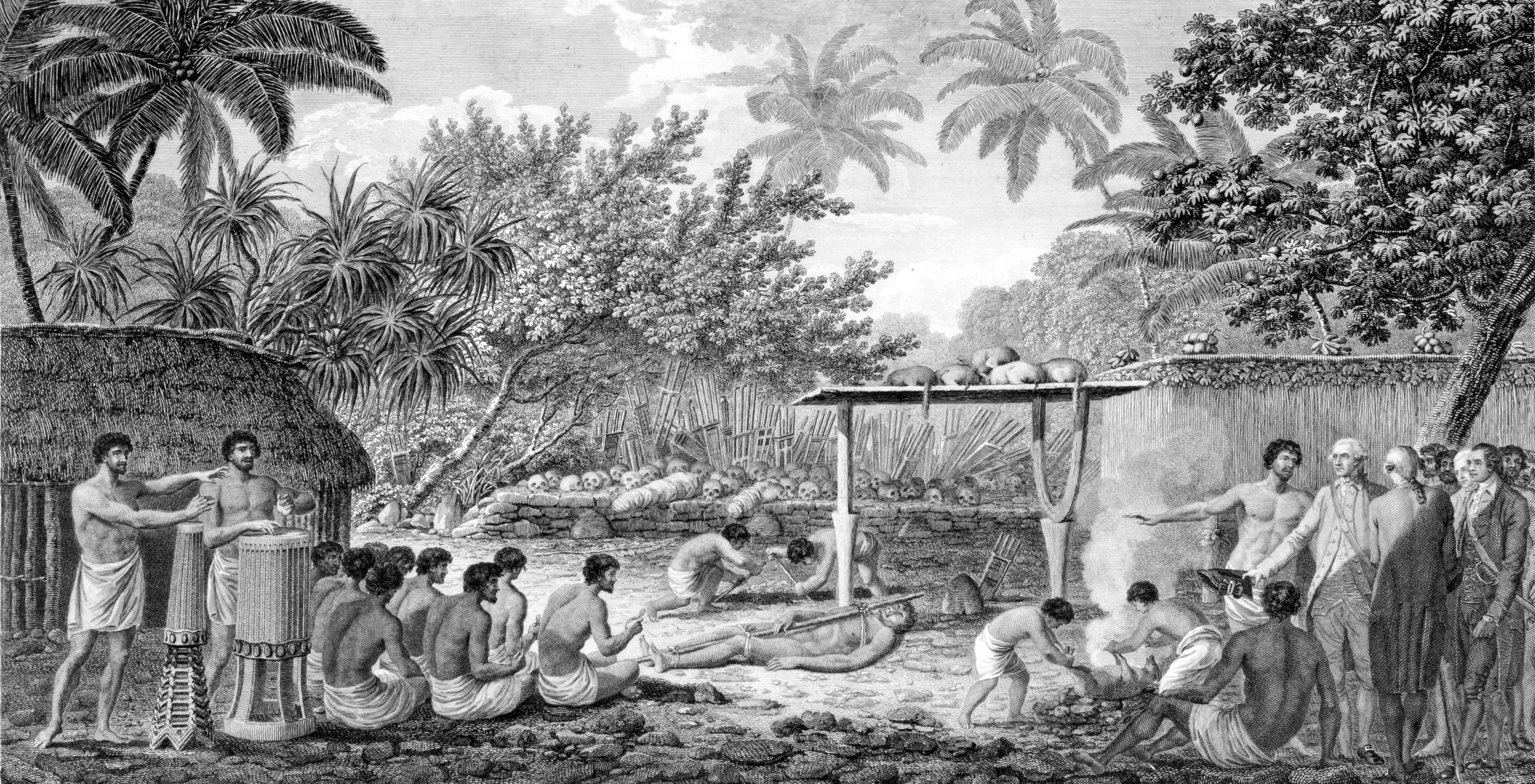
James Cook witnessing human sacrifice in Tahiti c. 1773

Cook almost encountered the mainland of Antarctica, but turned towards Tahiti to resupply his ship. He then resumed his southward course in a second fruitless attempt to find the supposed continent. On this leg of the voyage he brought a young Tahitian named Omai, who proved to be somewhat less knowledgeable about the Pacific than Tupaia had been on the first voyage. On his return voyage to New Zealand in 1774, Cook landed at the Friendly Islands, Easter Island, Norfolk Island, New Caledonia, and Vanuatu.

Before returning to England, Cook made a final sweep across the South Atlantic from Cape Horn. He then turned north to South Africa, and from there continued back to England. His reports upon his return home put to rest the popular myth of Terra Australis.

==== Third voyage (1776–1779) ====
On his last voyage, Cook again commanded HMS Resolution, while Captain Charles Clerke commanded HMS Discovery. The voyage was ostensibly planned to return the Pacific Islander, Omai to Tahiti, or so the public were led to believe. The trip's principal goal was to locate a North-West Passage around the American continent. After dropping Omai at Tahiti, Cook travelled north and in 1778 became the first European to visit the Hawaiian Islands. After his initial landfall in January 1778 at Waimea harbour, Kauaʻi, Cook named the archipelago the "Sandwich Islands" after the fourth Earl of Sandwich—the acting First Lord of the Admiralty.

From the Sandwich Islands Cook sailed north and then north-east to explore the west coast of North America north of the Spanish settlements in Alta California. Cook explored and mapped the coast all the way to the Bering Strait, on the way identifying what came to be known as Cook Inlet in Alaska. In a single visit, Cook charted the majority of the North American north-west coastline on world maps for the first time, determined the extent of Alaska, and closed the gaps in Russian (from the West) and Spanish (from the South) exploratory probes of the Northern limits of the Pacific.

Cook returned to Hawaii in 1779. After sailing around the archipelago for some eight weeks, he made landfall at Kealakekua Bay, on 'Hawaii Island', largest island in the Hawaiian Archipelago. Cook's arrival coincided with the Makahiki, a Hawaiian harvest festival of worship for the Polynesian god Lono. Coincidentally the form of Cook's ship, HMS Resolution, or more particularly the mast formation, sails and rigging, resembled certain significant artefacts that formed part of the season of worship. Similarly, Cook's clockwise route around the island of Hawaii before making landfall resembled the processions that took place in a clockwise direction around the island during the Lono festivals. It has been argued (most extensively by Marshall Sahlins) that such coincidences were the reasons for Cook's (and to a limited extent, his crew's) initial deification by some Hawaiians who treated Cook as an incarnation of Lono. Though this view was first suggested by members of Cook's expedition, the idea that any Hawaiians understood Cook to be Lono, and the evidence presented in support of it, were challenged in 1992.

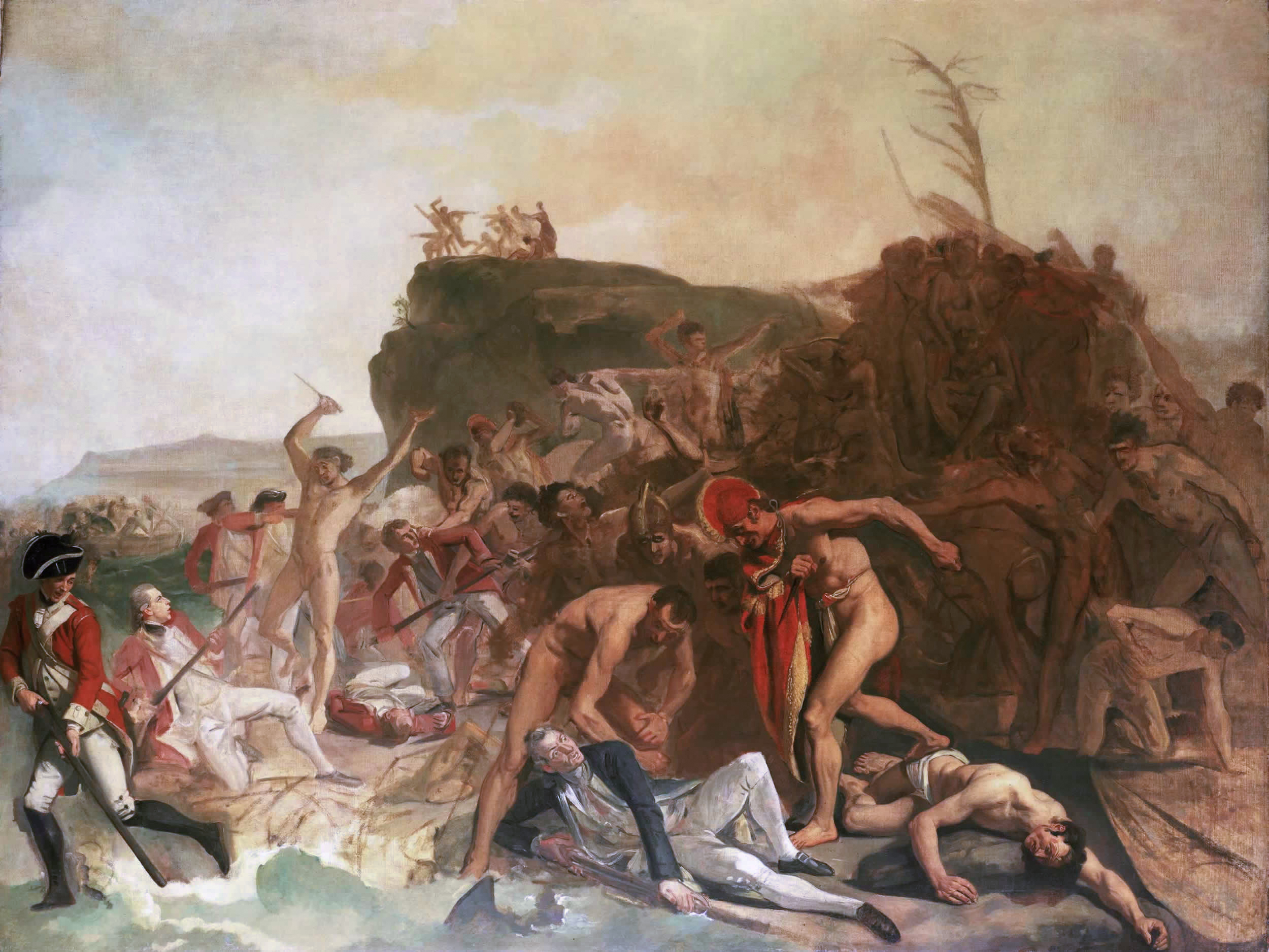
The Death of Captain James Cook, 14 February 1779, an unfinished painting by Johann Zoffany, c. 1795

After a month's stay, Cook resumed his exploration of the Northern Pacific. Shortly after leaving Hawaii Island, however, the Resolution's foremast broke, so the ships returned to Kealakekua Bay for repairs. Tensions rose, and a number of quarrels broke out between the Europeans and Hawaiians. On 14 February 1779, at Kealakekua Bay, some Hawaiians took one of Cook's small boats. As thefts were quite common in Tahiti and the other islands, Cook would have taken hostages until the stolen articles were returned. He attempted to take as hostage the King of Hawaiʻi, Kalaniʻōpuʻu. The Hawaiians prevented this, and Cook's men had to retreat to the beach. As Cook turned his back to help launch the boats, he was struck on the head by the villagers and then stabbed to death as he fell on his face in the surf. Hawaiian tradition says that he was killed by a chief named Kalaimanokahoʻowaha or Kanaʻina. The Hawaiians dragged his body away. Four of Cook's men were also killed and two others were wounded in the confrontation.

The esteem which the islanders nevertheless held for Cook caused them to retain his body. Following their practice of the time, they prepared his body with funerary rituals usually reserved for the chiefs and highest elders of the society. The body was disembowelled, baked to facilitate removal of the flesh, and the bones were carefully cleaned for preservation as religious icons in a fashion somewhat reminiscent of the treatment of European saints in the Middle Ages. Some of Cook's remains, thus preserved, were eventually returned to his crew for a formal burial at sea.

Clerke assumed leadership of the expedition. Following the death of Clerke, Resolution and Discovery returned home in October 1780 commanded by John Gore, a veteran of Cook's first voyage, and Captain James King. After their arrival in England, King completed Cook's account of the voyage.

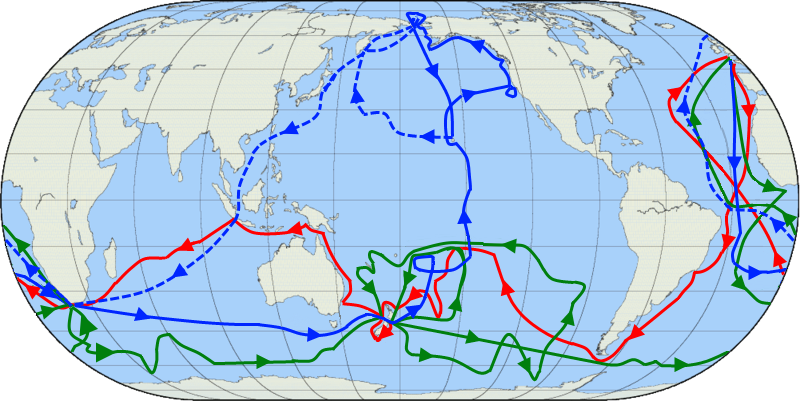
The routes of Captain James Cook's voyages. The first voyage is shown in red, second voyage in green, and third voyage in blue. The route of Cook's crew following his death is shown as a dashed blue line.

== Colonialism ==
Political map of the Asia-Pacific region, 1939.

=== British colonialism ===
In 1789, the Mutiny on the Bounty against William Bligh led to several of the mutineers escaping the Royal Navy and settling on Pitcairn Islands, which later became a British colony. Britain also established colonies in Australia in 1788, New Zealand in 1840 and Fiji in 1872, with much of Oceania being annexed by the British Empire.

The Gilbert Islands (now known as Kiribati) and the Ellice Islands (now known as Tuvalu) came under Britain's sphere of influence in the late 19th century. The Ellice Islands were administered as British protectorate by a Resident Commissioner from 1892 to 1916 under the Western Pacific High Commission, and later as part of the Gilbert and Ellice Islands Colony from 1916 to 1974.

Among the last islands in Oceania to be colonised was Niue (1900). In 1887, King Fata-a-iki, who reigned Niue from 1887 to 1896, offered to cede sovereignty to the British Empire, fearing the consequences of annexation by a less benevolent colonial power. The offer was not accepted until 1900. Niue was a British protectorate, but the UK's direct involvement ended in 1901 when New Zealand annexed the island.

=== French colonialism ===
Society Island kingdoms

French Catholic missionaries arrived on Tahiti in 1834; their expulsion in 1836 caused France to send a gunboat in 1838. In 1842, Tahiti and Tahuata were declared a French protectorate, to allow Catholic missionaries to work undisturbed. The capital of Papeetē was founded in 1843. In 1880, France annexed Tahiti, changing the status from that of a protectorate to that of a colony.

On 24 September 1853, under orders from Napoleon III, Admiral Febvrier Despointes took formal possession of New Caledonia and Port-de-France (Nouméa) was founded 25 June 1854. A few dozen free settlers settled on the west coast in the following years. New Caledonia became a penal colony, and from the 1860s until the end of the transportations in 1897, about 22,000 criminals and political prisoners were sent to New Caledonia, among them many Communards, including Henri de Rochefort and Louise Michel. Between 1873 and 1876, 4,200 political prisoners were "relegated" in New Caledonia. Only forty of them settled in the colony, the rest returned to France after being granted amnesty in 1879 and 1880.

In the 1880s, France claimed the Tuamotu Archipelago, which formerly belonged to the Pōmare Dynasty, without formally annexing it. Having declared a protectorate over Tahuata in 1842, the French regarded the entire Marquesas Islands as French. In 1885, France appointed a governor and established a general council, thus giving it the proper administration for a colony. The islands of Rimatara and Rūrutu unsuccessfully lobbied for British protection in 1888, so in 1889 they were annexed by France. Postage stamps were first issued in the colony in 1892. The first official name for the colony was Établissements de l'Océanie (Settlements in Oceania); in 1903 the general council was changed to an advisory council and the colony's name was changed to Établissements Français de l'Océanie (French Settlements in Oceania).

=== Spanish colonialism ===
The Spanish explorer Alonso de Salazar landed in the Marshall Islands in 1529. They were later named by Krusenstern, after English explorer John Marshall, who visited them together with Thomas Gilbert in 1788, en route from Botany Bay to Canton (two ships of the First Fleet).

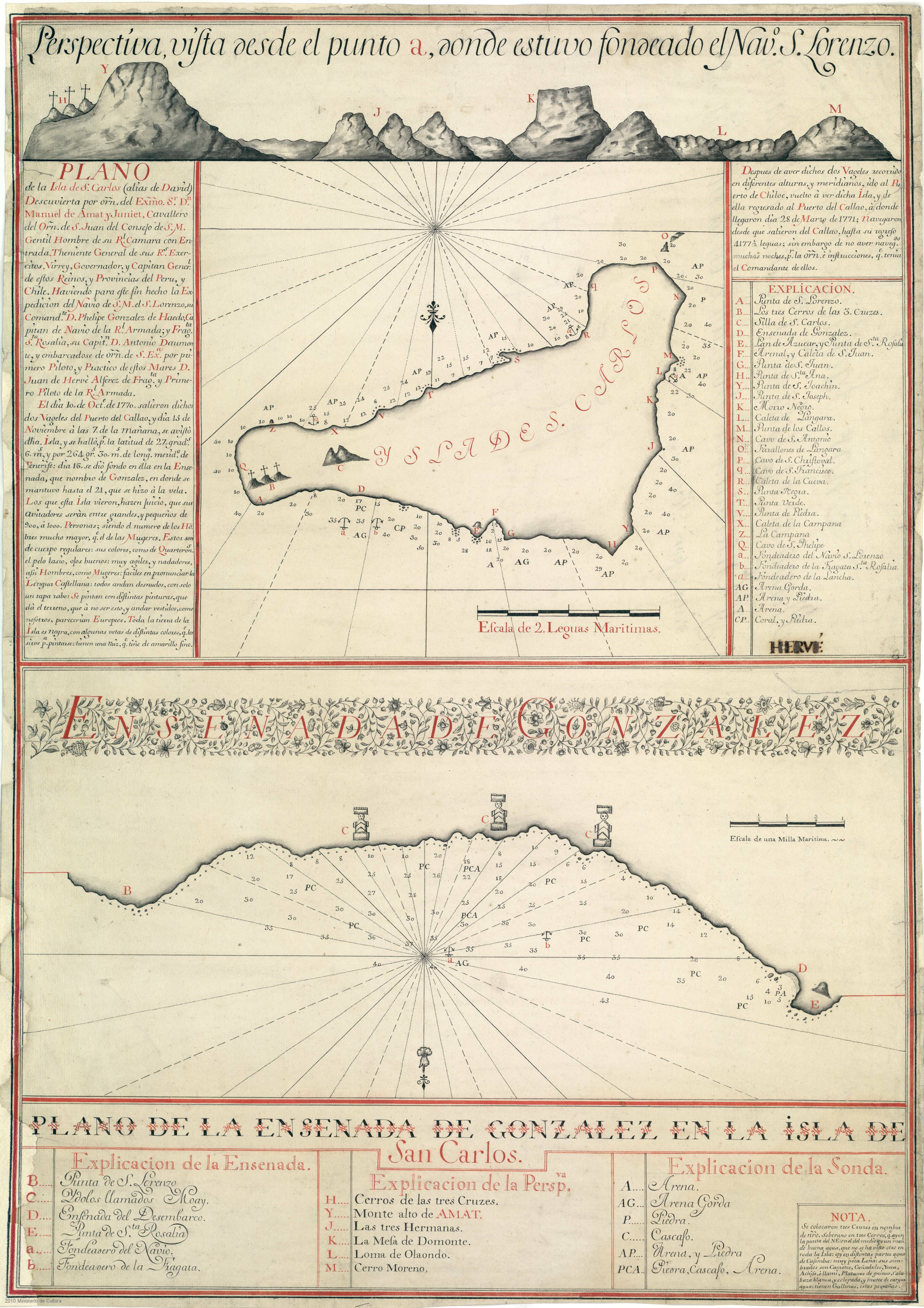
Map of Isla de San Carlos after the 1770 exploration.

In November 1770, Felipe González de Ahedo commanded an expedition from the Viceroyalty of Peru that searched for Davis Land and Madre de Dios Island and looked for foreign naval activities. This expedition landed on Isla de San Carlos (Easter Island) and signed a treaty of annexation with Rapa Nui king Atamu Tekena.

=== Dutch colonialism ===
In 1606, Luís Vaz de Torres explored the southern coast of New Guinea from Milne Bay to the Gulf of Papua including Orangerie Bay which he named Bahía de San Lorenzo. His expedition also discovered Basilaki Island naming it Tierra de San Buenaventura, which he claimed for Spain in July 1606. On 18 October his expedition reached the western part of the island in present-day Indonesia, and also claimed the territory for the King of Spain.

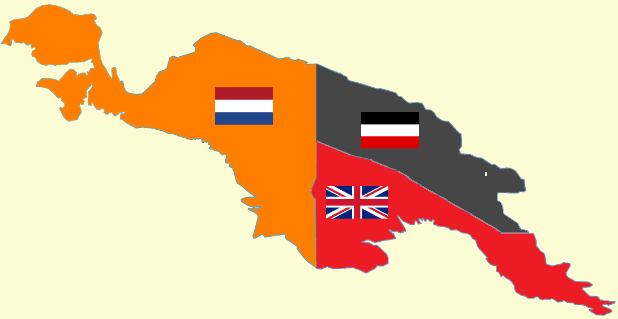
New Guinea from 1884 to 1919. The Netherlands controlled the western half of New Guinea, Germany the north-eastern part, and Britain the southeastern part.

A successive European claim occurred in 1828, when the Netherlands formally claimed the western half of the island as Dutch New Guinea. In 1883, following a short-lived French annexation of New Ireland, the British colony of Queensland annexed south-eastern New Guinea. However, the Queensland government's superiors in the United Kingdom revoked the claim, and (formally) assumed direct responsibility in 1884, when Germany claimed north-eastern New Guinea as the protectorate of German New Guinea (also called Kaiser-Wilhelmsland).

The first Dutch government posts were established in 1898 and in 1902: Manokwari on the north coast, Fak-Fak in the west and Merauke in the south at the border with British New Guinea. The German, Dutch and British colonial administrators each attempted to suppress the still-widespread practices of inter-village warfare and headhunting within their respective territories.

In 1905 the British government transferred some administrative responsibility over south-east New Guinea to Australia (which renamed the area "Territory of Papua"); and in 1906, transferred all remaining responsibility to Australia. During World War I, Australian forces seized German New Guinea, which in 1920 became the Territory of New Guinea, to be administered by Australia under a League of Nations mandate. The territories under Australian administration became collectively known as The Territories of Papua and New Guinea (until February 1942).

=== German colonialism ===
Germany established colonies in New Guinea in 1884 and Samoa in 1900. Following papal mediation and German compensation of $4.5 million, Spain recognized a German claim in 1885. Germany established a protectorate and set up trading stations on the islands of Jaluit and Ebon to carry out the flourishing copra (dried coconut meat) trade. Marshallese Iroij (high chiefs) continued to rule under indirect German colonial rule.

=== American colonialism ===
The United States also expanded into the Pacific, beginning with Baker Island and Howland Island in 1857, and with Hawaii becoming a U.S. territory in 1898. Territorial disputes between the US, Germany and UK over Samoa led to the Tripartite Convention of 1899.

Samoa aligned its interests with the United States in a Deed of Succession, signed by the Tui Manúʻa (supreme chief of Manúʻa) on 16 July 1904 at the Crown residence of the Tuimanuʻa called the Faleula in the place called Lalopua (from Official documents of the Tuimanuʻa government, 1893; Office of the Governor, 2004).

Cession followed the Tripartite Convention of 1899 that partitioned the eastern islands of Samoa (including Tutuila and the Manúʻa Group) from the western islands of Samoa (including ʻUpolu and Savaiʻi).

=== Japanese colonialism ===
At the beginning of World War I, Japan assumed control of the South Seas Mandate after annexing it from Germany. The Japanese headquarters was established at the German center of administration, Jaluit. On 31 January 1944, during World War II, American forces landed on Kwajalein atoll and U.S. Marines and Army troops later took control of the islands from the Japanese on 3 February, following intense fighting on Kwajalein and Enewetak atolls. In 1947, the United States, as the occupying power, entered into an agreement with the UN Security Council to administer much of Micronesia, including the Marshall Islands, as the Trust Territory of the Pacific Islands. During World War II, Japan occupied many Oceanian colonies by wresting control from Western powers.

== Samoan Crisis 1887–1889 ==
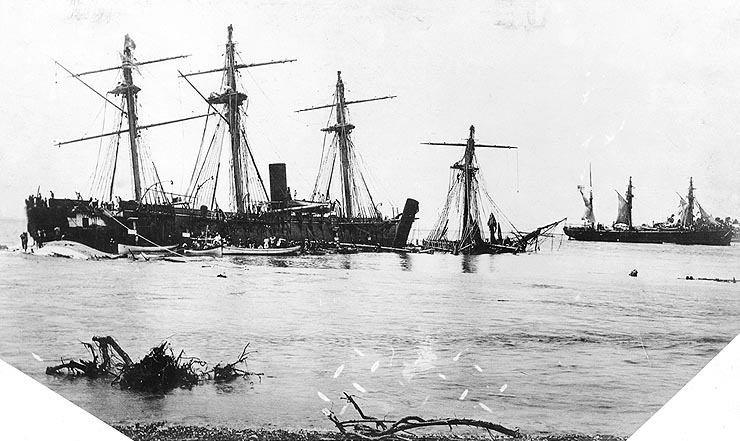
Wrecked vessels at Apia, 1889

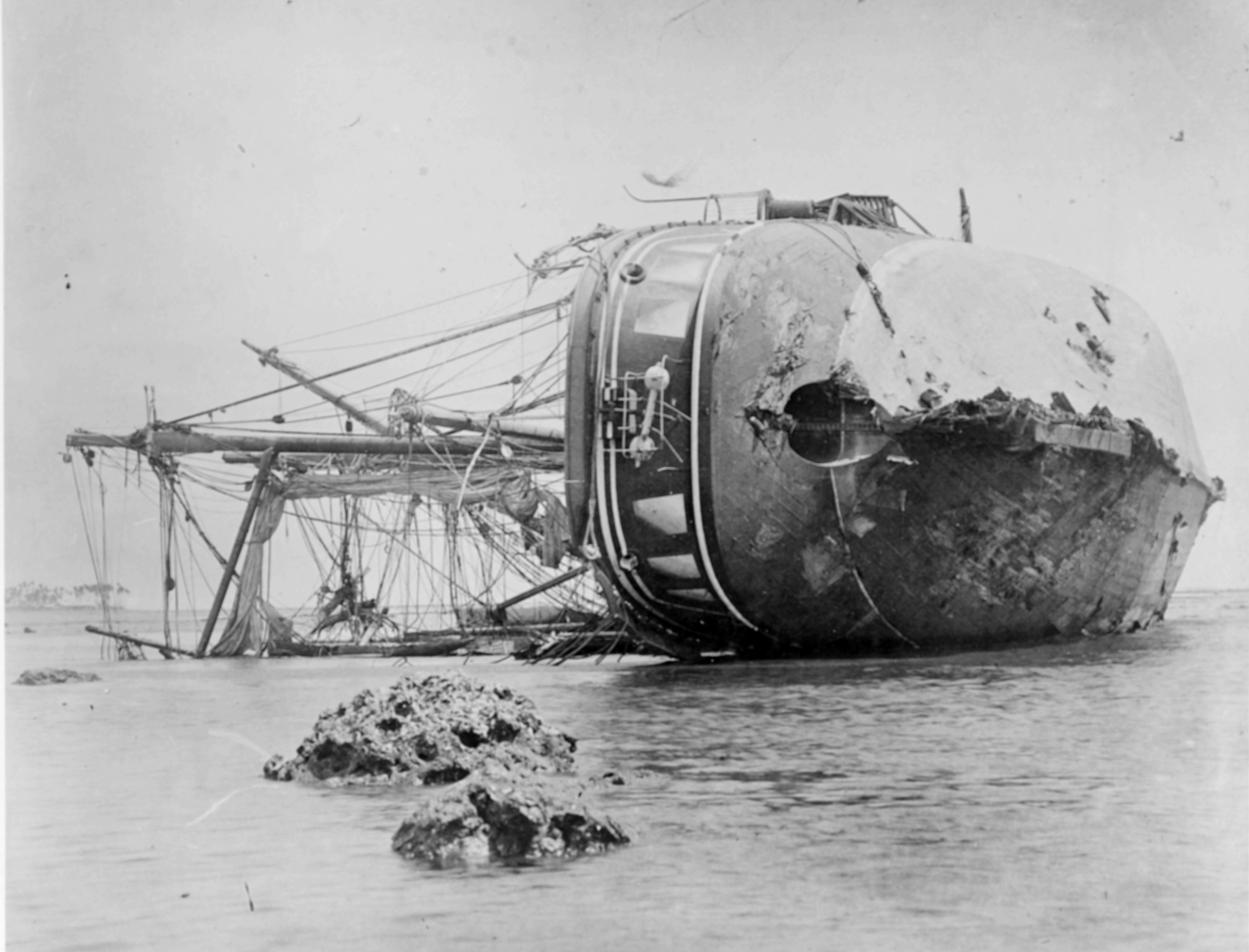
SMS Adler wrecked at Apia, 1889

The Samoan Crisis was a confrontation standoff between the United States, Imperial Germany, and the British Empire from 1887 to 1889 over control of the Samoan Islands during the Samoan Civil War.

The prime minister of the Kingdom of Hawaii, Walter M. Gibson, had long aimed to establishing an empire in the Pacific. In 1887, his government sent the "homemade battleship" Kaimiloa to Samoa looking for an alliance against colonial powers. It ended in suspicions from the German Navy and embarrassment for the conduct of the crew.

The 1889 incident involved three American warships, USS Vandalia, USS Trenton and USS Nipsic and three German warships, SMS Adler, SMS Olga, and SMS Eber, keeping each other at bay over several months in Apia harbor, which was monitored by the British warship HMS Calliope.

The standoff ended on 15 and 16 March, when a cyclone wrecked all six warships in the harbor. Calliope was able to escape the harbor and survived the storm. Robert Louis Stevenson witnessed the storm and its aftermath at Apia and later wrote about what he saw. The Samoan Civil War continued, involving Germany, United States, and Britain, eventually resulting, via the Tripartite Convention of 1899, in the partition of the Samoan Islands into American Samoa and German Samoa.

== World War I ==
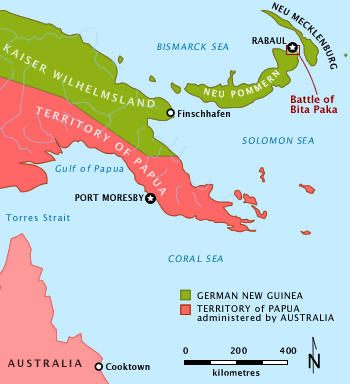
Location of Bita Paka, 1914.

The Asian and Pacific theatre of World War I was a conquest of German colonial possession in the Pacific Ocean and China. The most significant military action was the Siege of Tsingtao in what is now China, but smaller actions were also fought at Battle of Bita Paka and Siege of Toma in German New Guinea.

All other German and Austrian possessions in Asia and the Pacific fell without bloodshed. Naval warfare was common; all of the colonial powers had naval squadrons stationed in the Indian or Pacific Oceans. These fleets operated by supporting the invasions of German held territories and by destroying the East Asia Squadron.

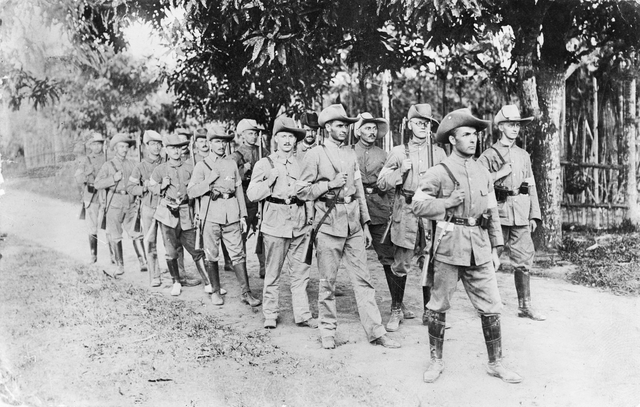
A platoon of German reservists at Bita Paka in 1914.

One of the first land offensives in the Pacific theatre was the Occupation of German Samoa in August 1914 by New Zealand forces. The campaign to take Samoa ended without bloodshed after over 1,000 New Zealanders landed on the German colony, supported by an Australian and French naval squadron.

Australian forces attacked German New Guinea in September 1914: 500 Australians encountered 300 Germans and native policemen at the Battle of Bita Paka; the Allies won the day and the Germans retreated to Toma. A company of Australians and a British warship besieged the Germans and their colonial subjects, ending with a German surrender.

After the fall of Toma, only minor German forces were left in New Guinea and these generally capitulated once met by Australian forces. In December 1914, one German officer near Angorum attempted resist the occupation with thirty native police but his force deserted him after they fired on an Australian scouting party and he was subsequently captured. German Micronesia, the Marianas, the Carolines and the Marshall Islands also fell to Allied forces during the war.

== World War II ==
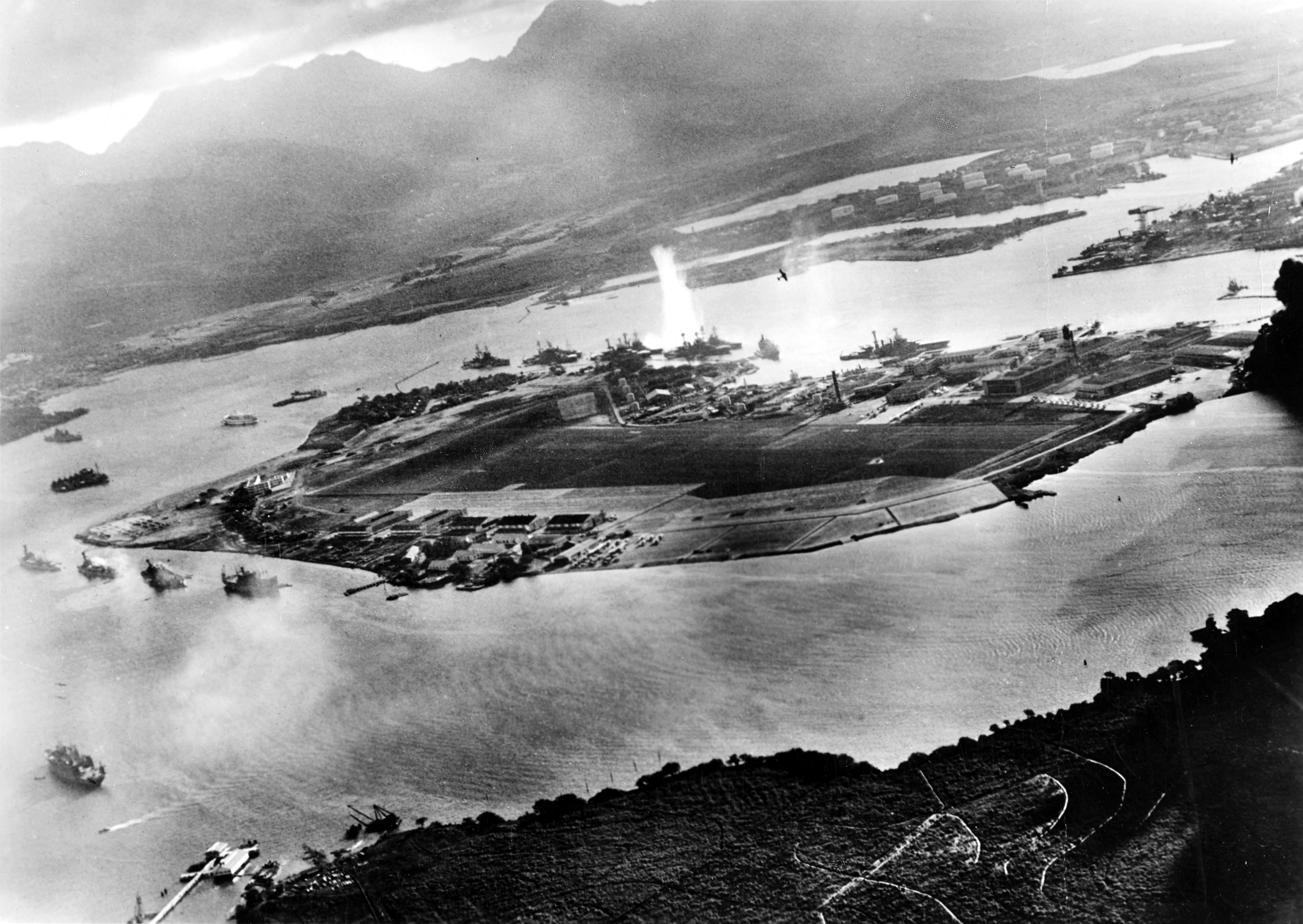
Photograph from a Japanese plane of Battleship Row at the beginning of the attack. The explosion in the center is a torpedo strike on the USS West Virginia. Two attacking Japanese planes can be seen: one over the USS Neosho and one over the Naval Yard.

The Pacific front saw major action during the Second World War, mainly between the belligerents Japan and the United States.

The attack on Pearl Harbor (Note: Also known as the Battle of Pearl Harbor, the Hawaii Operation or Operation AI by the Japanese Imperial General Headquarters, and Operation Z during planning.) was a surprise military strike conducted by the Imperial Japanese Navy against the United States naval base at Pearl Harbor, Hawaii, on the morning of 7 December 1941 (8 December in Japan). The attack led to the United States' entry into World War II.

The attack was intended as a preventive action in order to keep the U.S. Pacific Fleet from interfering with military actions the Empire of Japan was planning in South-East Asia against overseas territories of the United Kingdom, the Netherlands, and the United States. There were simultaneous Japanese attacks on the U.S.-held Philippines and on the British Empire in Malaya, Singapore, and Hong Kong.

The Japanese subsequently invaded New Guinea, the Solomon Islands and other Pacific islands. The Japanese were turned back at the Battle of the Coral Sea and the Kokoda Track campaign before they were finally defeated in 1945.

Some of the most prominent Oceanic battlegrounds were the Solomon Islands campaign, the Air raids on Darwin, the Kokada Track, and the Borneo campaign.

In 1940, the administration of French Polynesia recognized the Free French Forces and many Polynesians served in World War II. Unknown at the time to French and Polynesians, the Konoe Cabinet in Imperial Japan on 16 September 1940 included French Polynesia among the many territories which were to become Japanese possessions in the post-war world—though in the course of the war in the Pacific the Japanese were not able to launch an actual invasion of the French islands.

=== Solomon Islands campaign ===
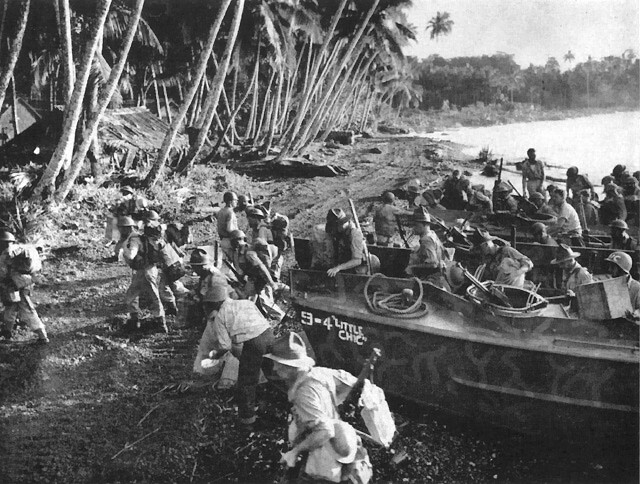
New Zealand troops land on Vella Lavella, in the Solomon Islands

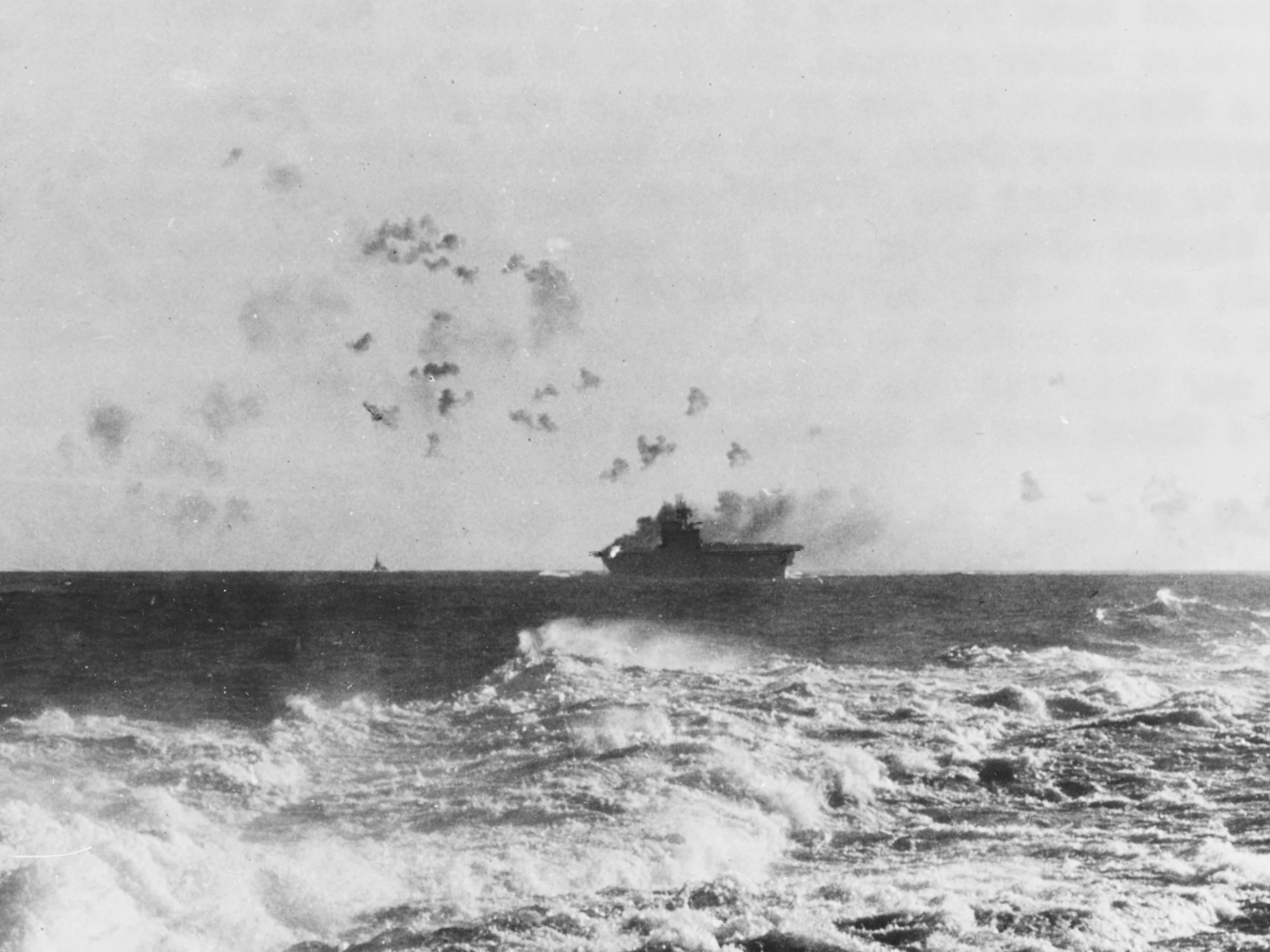
The aircraft carrier USS Enterprise (CV-6) under aerial attack during the Battle of the Eastern Solomons

Some of the most intense fighting of World War II occurred in the Solomons. The most significant of the Allied Forces' operations against the Japanese Imperial Forces was launched on 7 August 1942, with simultaneous naval bombardments and amphibious landings on the Florida Islands at Tulagi and Red Beach on Guadalcanal.

The Guadalcanal campaign became an important and bloody campaign fought in the Pacific War as the Allies began to repulse Japanese expansion. Of strategic importance during the war were the coastwatchers operating in remote locations, often on Japanese held islands, providing early warning and intelligence of Japanese naval, army and aircraft movements during the campaign.

"The Slot" was a name for New Georgia Sound, when it was used by the Tokyo Express to supply the Japanese garrison on Guadalcanal. Of more than 36,000 Japanese on Guadalcanal, about 26,000 were killed or missing, 9,000 died of disease, and 1,000 were captured.

=== Kokoda Track campaign ===
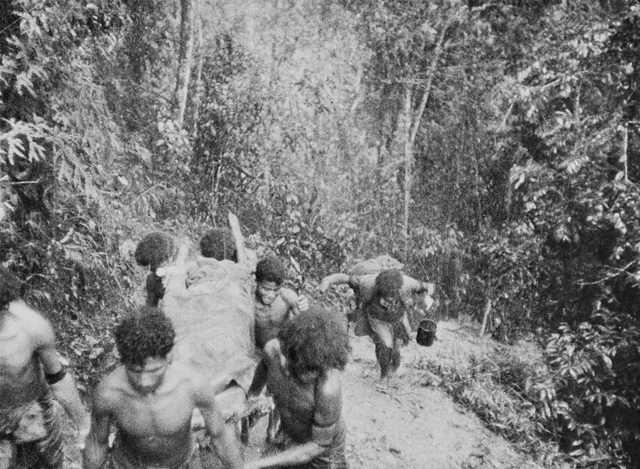
Papuan carriers evacuate Australian casualties on 30 August 1942

The Kokoda Track campaign was a campaign consisting of a series of battles fought between July and November 1942 between Japanese and Allied—primarily Australian—forces in what was then the Australian territory of Papua. Following a landing near Gona, on the north coast of New Guinea, Japanese forces attempted to advance south overland through the mountains of the Owen Stanley Range to seize Port Moresby as part of a strategy of isolating Australia from the United States. Initially only limited Australian forces were available to oppose them, and after making rapid progress the Japanese South Seas Force clashed with under strength Australian forces at Awala, forcing them back to Kokoda. A number of Japanese attacks were subsequently fought off by the Australian Militia, yet they began to withdraw over the Owen Stanley Range, down the Kokoda Track.

In sight of Port Moresby itself, the Japanese began to run out of momentum against the Australians who began to receive further reinforcements. Having outrun their supply lines and following the reverses suffered by the Japanese at Guadalcanal, the Japanese were now on the defensive, marking the limit of the Japanese advance southwards. The Japanese subsequently withdrew to establish a defensive position on the north coast, but they were followed by the Australians who recaptured Kokoda on 2 November. Further fighting continued into November and December as the Australian and United States forces assaulted the Japanese beachheads, in what later became known as the Battle of Buna–Gona.

== Nuclear testing in Oceania ==
A 21-kiloton underwater nuclear weapons test, known as Operation Crossroads (Event Baker), conducted at Bikini Atoll (1946)

Due to its low population, Oceania was a popular location for atmospheric and underground nuclear tests. Tests were conducted in various locations by the United Kingdom (Operation Grapple and Operation Antler), the United States (Bikini atoll and the Marshall Islands) and France (Moruroa), often with devastating consequences for the inhabitants.

From 1946 to 1958, the Marshall Islands served as the Pacific Proving Grounds for the United States, and was the site of 67 nuclear tests on various atolls. The world's first hydrogen bomb, codenamed "Mike", was tested at the Enewetak atoll in the Marshall Islands on 1 November (local date) in 1952, by the United States.

In 1954, fallout from the American Castle Bravo hydrogen bomb test in the Marshall Islands was such that the inhabitants of the Rongelap Atoll were forced to abandon their island. Three years later the islanders were allowed to return, but suffered abnormally high levels of cancer. They were evacuated again in 1985 and in 1996 given $45 million in compensation.

A series of British tests were also conducted in the 1950s at Maralinga in South Australia, forcing the removal of the Pitjantjatjara and Yankunytjatjara peoples from their ancestral homelands.

In 1962, France's early nuclear testing ground of Algeria became independent and the atoll of Moruroa in the Tuamotu Archipelago was selected as the new testing site. Moruroa atoll became notorious as a site of French nuclear testing, primarily because tests were carried out there after most Pacific testing had ceased. These tests were opposed by most other nations in Oceania. The last atmospheric test was conducted in 1974, and the last underground test in 1996.

French nuclear testing in the Pacific was controversial in the 1980s, in 1985 French agents caused the Sinking of the Rainbow Warrior in Auckland to prevent it from arriving at the test site in Moruroa. In September 1995, France stirred up widespread protests by resuming nuclear testing at Fangataufa atoll after a three-year moratorium. The last test was on 27 January 1996. On 29 January 1996, France announced that it would accede to the Comprehensive Test Ban Treaty, and no longer test nuclear weapons.

== Fijian coups ==
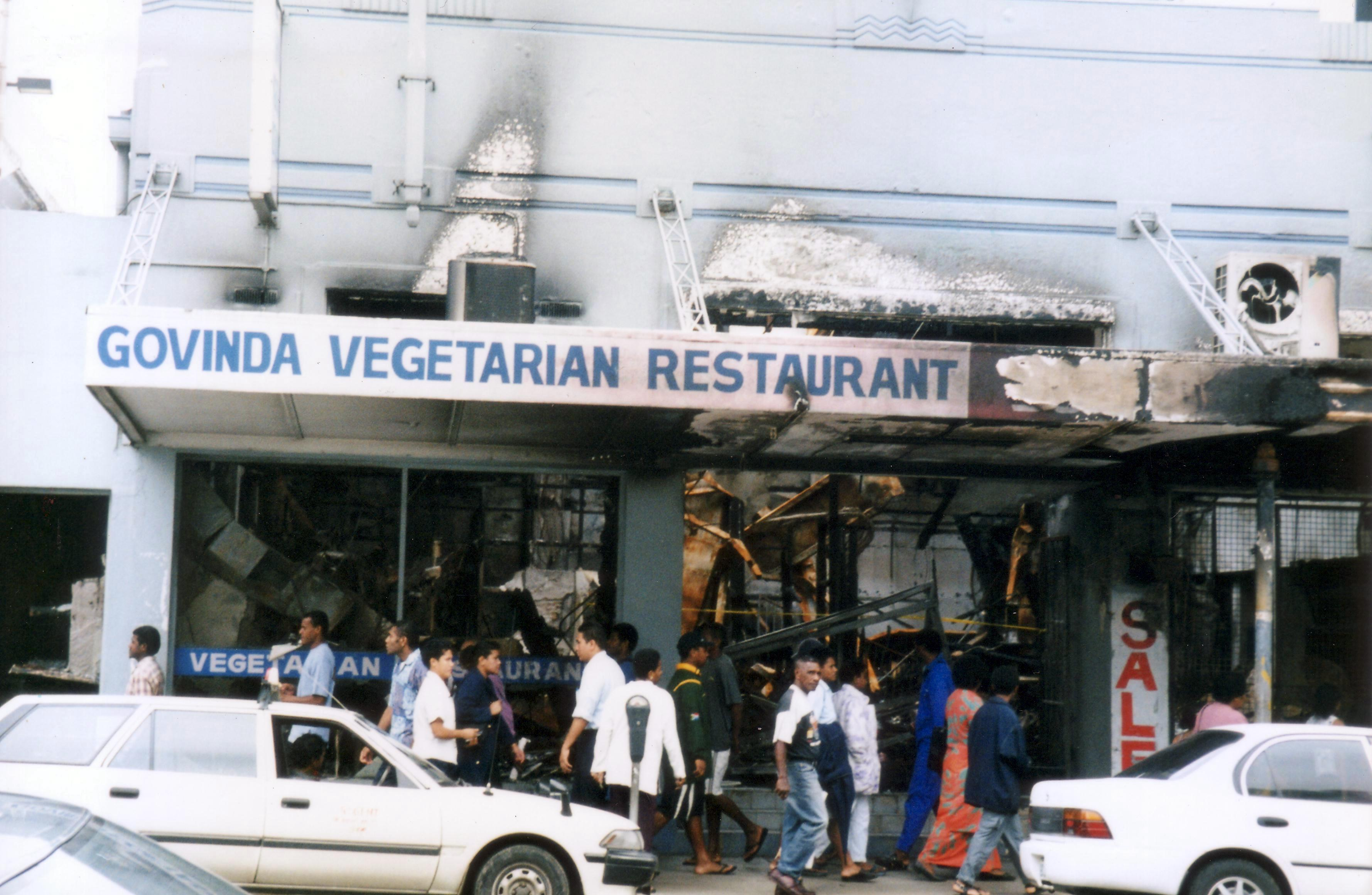
The burnt out remains of Govinda's Restaurant in Suva: over 100 shops and businesses were ransacked in Suva's central business district on 19 May 2000

Fiji has suffered several coups d'état: military in 1987 and 2006 and civilian in 2000. All were ultimately due to ethnic tension between indigenous Fijians and Indo-Fijians, who originally came to the islands as indentured labor in the late nineteenth and early twentieth century. The 1987 coup followed the election of a multi-ethnic coalition, which Lieutenant Colonel Sitiveni Rabuka overthrew, claiming racial discrimination against ethnic Fijians. The coup was denounced by the United Nations and Fiji was expelled from the Commonwealth of Nations.

The 2000 coup was essentially a repeat of the 1987 affair, although it was led by civilian George Speight, apparently with military support. Commodore Frank Bainimarama, who was opposed to Speight, then took over and appointed a new Prime Minister. Speight was later tried and convicted for treason. Many indigenous Fijians were unhappy at the treatment of Speight and his supporters, feeling that the coup had been legitimate. In 2006 the Fijian parliament attempted to introduce a series of bills which would have, amongst other things, pardoned those involved in the 2000 coup. Bainimarama, concerned that the legal and racial injustices of the previous coups would be perpetuated, staged his own coup. It was internationally condemned, and Fiji again suspended from the Commonwealth.

In 2006 the then Australia Defence Minister, Brendan Nelson, warned Fijian officials of an Australian Naval fleet within proximity of Fiji that would respond to any attacks against its citizens.

== Bougainville Civil War ==
The Australian government estimated that anywhere between 15,000 and 20,000 people could have died in the Bougainville Civil War. More conservative estimates put the number of combat deaths as 1–2,000.

From 1975, there were attempts by the Bougainville Province to secede from Papua New Guinea. These were resisted by Papua New Guinea primarily because of the presence in Bougainville of the Panguna mine, which was vital to Papua New Guinea's economy. The Bougainville Revolutionary Army began attacking the mine in 1988, forcing its closure the following year. Further BRA activity led to the declaration of a state of emergency and the conflict continued until about 2005, when successionist leader and self-proclaimed King of Bougainville Francis Ona died of malaria. Peacekeeping troops led by Australia have been in the region since the late 1990s, and a referendum on independence will be held in the 2010s.

== Modern age ==
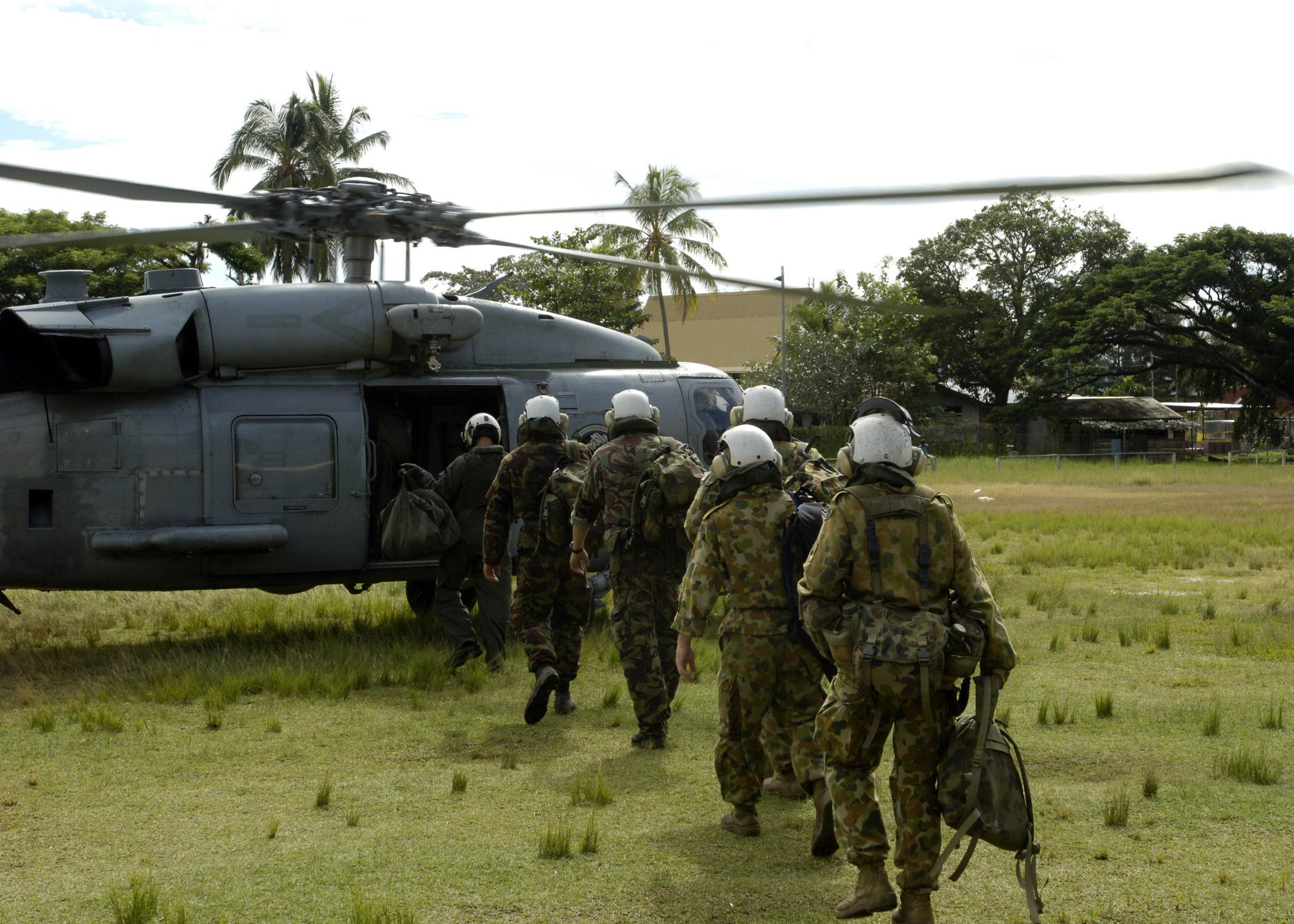
New Zealand and Australian military personnel boarding a Sea Hawk helicopter as part of the Regional Assistance Mission to Solomon Islands in 2007

In 1946, French Polynesians were granted French citizenship and the islands' status was changed to an overseas territory; the islands' name was changed in 1957 to Polynésie Française (French Polynesia).

Australia and New Zealand became dominions in the 20th century, adopting the Statute of Westminster Act in 1942 and 1947 respectively, marking their legislative independence from the United Kingdom. Hawaii became a U.S. state in 1959.

Samoa became the first pacific nation to gain independence in 1962. Nauru became second in 1968, followed by Fiji and Tonga in 1970 and numerous other nations in the 1970s and 1980s. The South Pacific Forum was founded in 1971, which became the Pacific Islands Forum in 2000. Bougainville Island, geographically part of the Solomon Islands archipelago but politically part of Papua New Guinea, tried unsuccessfully to become independent in 1975, and a civil war followed in the early 1990s, with it later being granted autonomy.

On 1 May 1979, in recognition of the evolving political status of the Marshall Islands, the United States recognized the constitution of the Marshall Islands and the establishment of the Government of the Republic of the Marshall Islands. The constitution incorporates both American and British constitutional concepts.

In 1852, French Polynesia was granted partial internal autonomy; in 1984, the autonomy was extended. French Polynesia became a full overseas collectivity of France in 2004.

Between 2001 and 2007 Australia's Pacific Solution policy transferred asylum seekers to several Pacific nations, including the Nauru detention centre. Australia, New Zealand and other nations took part in the Regional Assistance Mission to Solomon Islands from 2003 after a request for aid.

== See also ==
- Europeans in Oceania
- History of Australia
- History of Bougainville
- History of New Zealand
- History of Solomon Islands
- History of the Pacific Islands
- List of countries and islands by first human settlement
- List of Oceanian cuisines

== Bibliography ==
- Collingridge, Vanessa (2003). Captain Cook: The Life, Death and Legacy of History's Greatest Explorer. Ebury Press. ISBN 0-09-188898-0.
- Hough, Richard (1994). Captain James Cook. Hodder and Stoughton. ISBN 0-340-82556-1.
- Kirch, Patrick Vinton (2001). On the Road of the Winds: An Archaeological History of the Pacific Islands Before European Contact. University of California Press. ISBN 978-0-520-92896-1.
- Lal, Brij V.; Fortune, Kate (2000). The Pacific Islands: An Encyclopedia. University of Hawaii Press. ISBN 978-0-8248-2265-1.
- Morison, Samuel Eliot (2001). History of United States Naval Operations in World War II: The rising sun in the Pacific, 1931 – April 1942. University of Illinois Press. ISBN 0-252-06973-0.
- Obeyesekere, Gananath (1992). The Apotheosis of Captain Cook: European Mythmaking in the Pacific. Princeton University Press. ISBN 0-691-05752-4.
- Obeyesekere, Gananath (1997). The Apotheosis of Captain Cook: European Mythmaking in the Pacific. Princeton University Press. ISBN 978-0-691-05752-1. "With new preface and afterword replying to criticism from Sahlins."
- Sahlins, Marshall David (1985). Islands of history. University of Chicago Press. ISBN 978-0-226-73358-6.
