= Guarello Island =

Island in Chile

Native name: Isla Guarello
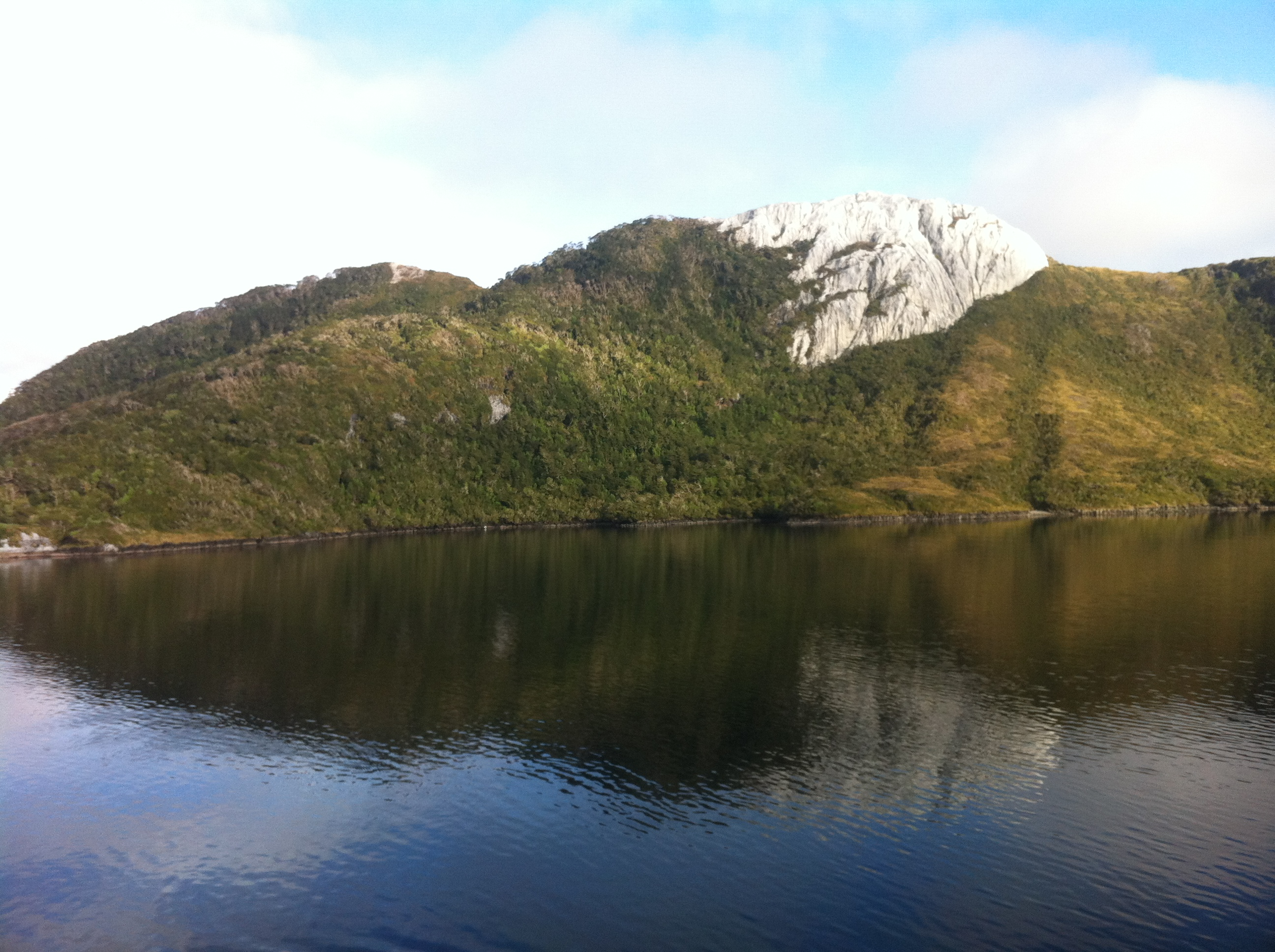
- Guerello Island seen from Contreras Sound

- Location within Chile

Geography
- Coordinates: 50°23′S 75°20′W
- Adjacent to: Pacific Ocean

Administration
- Chile
- Region: Magallanes

Additional information
- NGA UFI=-883834

Guarello Island (Spanish: Isla Guarello) is an island in Madre de Dios Archipelago in Magallanes Region of Chile. Guarello Island is in a limestone area that also includes Madre de Dios Island. The island has the world's southernmost limestone mine and it has reserves for 100 years, and 600,000 tons of limestone with a millesimal fineness of 96% of Calcium carbonate are extracted each year. Half of the production is used in the steel mills of Huachipato which also owns the mines.

The origin of the quarry date back to the 1940s when Compañía de Acero del Pacífico (CAP) sought a limestone source for its steel mill in Huachipato. CAP contracted geologist Carlos Ruiz Fuller who helped identify the limestone area from aereal photographs. The establishment of a quarry in the Guarello Island was approved by CAP 1946 and after studies that concluded in 1948 works to establish the quarry begun in 1949. The first shipment of lime departed isla Guarello in March 1950. Initially an underground quarry given the adverse climate in the mid-1950s the ceiling collapsed turning the quarry into an open pit.

== See also ==
- Cutter Cove, a closed copper–gold–zinc mine near the Strait of Magellan.
- List of islands of Chile
