= Madre de Dios Island =

Island in Chile

Native name: Isla Madre de Dios
- Location within Chile

Geography
- Coordinates: 50°06′10″S 75°14′38″W
- Adjacent to: Pacific Ocean
- Area: 1,043 km^{2} (403 sq mi)
- Coastline: 549.5 km (341.44 mi)

Administration
- Chile
- Region: Magallanes

Additional information
- NGA UFI=-891233

Madre de Dios Island (Spanish: Isla Madre de Dios, Spanish pronunciation: [ˈmaðɾe ðe ðjos]) is an uninhabited island in the Magallanes Region, Chile. It is located west of the Trinidad Channel and Concepción Channel. Madre de Dios Island is composed partly of limestone and has several natural caves. In one of those caves, called the "Cave of the Whales", skeletons of whales 2600 to 3500 years old have been discovered 10 to 30 meters above sea level. In another cave, named Cueva del Pacifico, rock art was discovered in 2006. Many other caves near the coast were used by the indigenous Kaweskar people for burial. One skull found dates back to 4500 years ago. Some caves were used as temporary camps. The island, along with 53 smaller nearby islands, was protected as a nature reserve (Bien Nacional Protegido) in 2007.

The island obtained its current name from a map in Alonso de Ovalle's work Histórica relación del reino de Chile which was published in 1646 in Italy. Apparently Alonso de Ovalle had based this name on the exploration of Pedro Sarmiento de Gamboa's expedition in the area in 1579. Pedro Sarmiento de Gamboa had called a cove from where he made observations Nuestra Señora (del Rosario), and from this name Alonso de Ovalle elaborated it to Madre de Dios and extended it to name a whole island.

== See also ==
- List of islands of Chile
- Guarello Island
- Madre de Dios Terrane
