= Senyavin Islands =

Group of islands in the Federal States of Micronesia

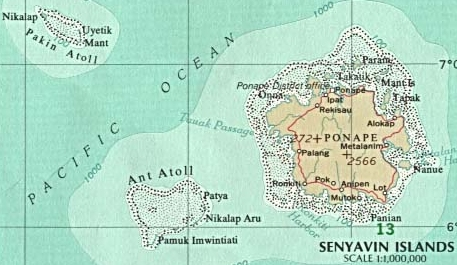
- Senyavin Islands (Pohnpei/Ponape plus two neighboring atolls)

- Location within Pacific Ocean

Geography
- Location: Pacific Ocean
- Coordinates: 6°50′N 158°08′E
- Archipelago: Caroline Islands
- Total islands: 3
- Major islands: Pohnpei, Ant Atoll, Pakin Atoll
- Area: 337 km^{2} (130 sq mi)
- Highest elevation: 782 m (2566 ft)
- Highest point: Mount Nanlaud

Administration
- Federated States of Micronesia
- State: Pohnpei State
- Largest settlement: Kolonia (pop. 6,000)

Demographics
- Population: 34,000

Additional information
- Time zone: UTC (UTC+11)

The Senyavin Islands belong to Pohnpei State in the Federated States of Micronesia. They consist of a larger volcanic Pohnpei Island (about 334 km^{2}) and two small atolls Ant and Pakin.

== History ==
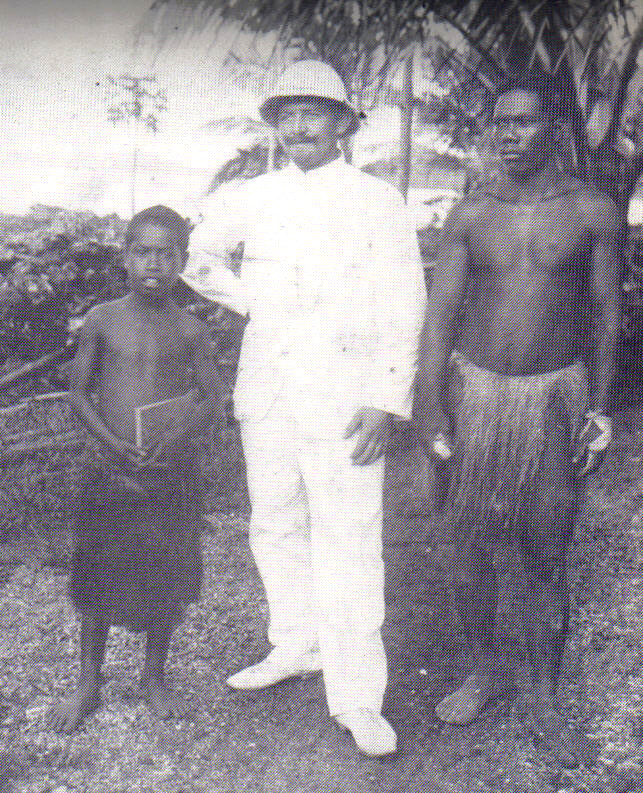
Photo of Karl Kammerich, part of the German colonial presence, 1899–1914 (photo 1905–1910)

On Pohnpei, pre-colonial history is divided into three eras: Mwehin Kawa or Mwehin Aramas (Period of Building, or Period of Peopling, before ca. 1100); Mwehin Sau Deleur (Period of the Lord of Deleur, ca. 1100 to ca. 1628); (Note: The Saudeleur era lasted around 500 years. Legend generally dates their downfall to the 1500s, however archaeologists date Saudeleur ruins to ca. 1628.) and Mwehin Nahnmwarki (Period of the Nahnmwarki, ca. 1628 to ca. 1885). Pohnpeian legend recounts that the Saudeleur rulers, the first to bring government to Pohnpei, were of foreign origin. The Saudeleur centralized form of absolute rule is characterized in Pohnpeian legend as becoming increasingly oppressive over several generations. Arbitrary and onerous demands, as well as a reputation for offending Pohnpeian deities, sowed resentment among Pohnpeians. The Saudeleur Dynasty ended with the invasion of Isokelekel, another semi-mythical foreigner, who replaced the Saudeleur rule with the more decentralized nahnmwarki system in existence today.

For the Europeans these islands were discovered first by Pedro Fernández de Quirós On 10 September 1825 Captain Row, in the brig John Bull passed within 40 miles from some islands at 6°47′N 158°1′E as he was sailing from New South Wales to Canton. He did not approach more closely as he sighted five boats that gave chase. John Bull was lightly armed and so Row was unwilling to interact with them, choosing instead to sail on. He believed the islands were unknown and so named them "John Bull's Islands". In 1828 Russian navigator Fyodor Litke named the group after Russian admiral Dmitry Senyavin.
