= List of shipwrecks in November 1830 =

List of shipwrecks in November 1830 includes ships sunk, foundered, grounded, or otherwise lost during November 1830.

== 1 November ==
List of shipwrecks: 1 November 1830
Ship	State	Description
Carl Brandt	Norway	The ship was driven ashore near Hammerfest. Her crew were rescued. She was on a voyage from Arkhangelsk, Russia to Hammerfest.
Scotia	(United Kingdom of Great Britain and Ireland) British North America	The ship was wrecked near Métis-sur-Mer, Lower Canada. She was on a voyage from Quebec City, Lower Canada to Limerick, United Kingdom.

== 3 November ==
List of shipwrecks: 3 November 1830
Ship	State	Description
Anna Maria	Netherlands	The ship was wrecked in the Eider. She was on a voyage from Amsterdam, North Holland to Copenhagen, Denmark.
Charlotte	United Kingdom	The ship sank at Scarborough, Yorkshire.
Grantham	United Kingdom	The brig was wrecked on the Pudding and Pie Sand, in the Humber between Goole and Hull, Yorkshire. She was on a voyage from Gainsborough, Lincolnshire to London.
Industry	United Kingdom	The ship sank at Scarborough.
Leeds	United Kingdom	The ship was driven ashore and wrecked at Spurn Point, Yorkshire. Her crew were rescued.
Providence	United Kingdom	The ship sank at Scarborough. She was refloated on 14 November and found to be severely damaged.
Thomas	United Kingdom	The brig was wrecked on the Pudding and Pie Sand. She was on a voyage from London to Goole, Yorkshire.

== 5 November ==
List of shipwrecks: 5 November 1830
Ship	State	Description
Isabella and Dorothy	United Kingdom	The ship was wrecked in the Sound of Hoy. She was on a voyage from Quebec City, Lower Canada, British North America to Hull, Yorkshire.

== 6 November ==
List of shipwrecks: 6 November 1830
Ship	State	Description
Betsey	United Kingdom	The ship was driven ashore on Hogland, Russia. She was on a voyage from Málaga, Spain to Saint Petersburg, Russia.
London	United Kingdom	The ship sank in the River Thames near Shadwell, Middlesex. She was later refloated and beached.
Margaret	United Kingdom	The ship departed from Wicklow for London. No further trace, presumed foundered with the loss of all hands.
Salter	United Kingdom	The ship foundered in the North Sea off Hollesley Bay, Suffolk with the loss of all hands.

== 7 November ==
List of shipwrecks: 7 November 1830
Ship	State	Description
Skylark	United Kingdom	The ship foundered in the Irish Sea off Bardsey Island, Caernarfonshire. Her rew were rescued. She was on a voyage from Plymouth, Devon to Liverpool, Lancashire.

== 8 November ==
List of shipwrecks: 8 November 1830
Ship	State	Description
Cathelma	France	The ship was wrecked at Ferrol, Spain. She was on a voyage from Bordeaux, Gironde to Campeche, Mexico
Mary Ann	United Kingdom	The ship sank at Caernarfon. She was later refloated and beached. Mary Ann was on a voyage from Cork to Liverpool, Lancashire.

== 10 November ==
List of shipwrecks: 10 November 1830
Ship	State	Description
Gordon	United Kingdom	The sloop was driven ashore crewless on the Mull of Galloway, Ayrshire.

== 11 November ==
List of shipwrecks: 11 November 1830
Ship	State	Description
Amethyst	United Kingdom	The ship was driven ashore near Étaples, Pas-de-Calais, France. Her crew were rescued. She was on a voyage from Saint Domingue to London.
Earl of Selkirk	United Kingdom	The ship was driven ashore and wrecked in Black Mull Bay. She was on a voyage from Fraserburgh, Aberdeenshire to Sligo.
Eliza Jean	(United Kingdom of Great Britain and Ireland) Jersey	The schooner was wrecked at the mouth of the River Ribble. Her crew survived. She was on a voyage from Jersey to Liverpool, Lancashire.

== 12 November ==
List of shipwrecks: 12 November 1830
Ship	State	Description
Benjamin and Mary	United Kingdom	The ship was wrecked on the Neding Reef, in the Baltic Sea off Gothenborg, Sweden. She was on a voyage from Saint Petersburg, Russia to London.
Falgor	France	The ship was driven ashore and wrecked at Southampton, Hampshire, United Kingdom. She was on a voyage from Bordeaux, Gironde to New York, United States.
Hopewell	(United Kingdom of Great Britain and Ireland) British North America	The ship was driven ashore at Sandy Hook, New Jersey, United States. She was refloated on 4 December.
Pegasus	United Kingdom	The ship was wrecked on Cape Sable Island, Nova Scotia, British North America. She was on a voyage from Grenada to Newfoundland, British North America.
Speedwell	United Kingdom	The ship was wrecked in the Firth of Tay with the loss of all hands.

== 14 November ==
List of shipwrecks: 14 November 1830
Ship	State	Description
Evadne	United Kingdom	The ship was wrecked on the Cross Sand, in the North Sea off the coast of Norfolk. Her crew were rescued. She was on a voyage from Sunderland, County Durham to London.

== 15 November ==
List of shipwrecks: 15 November 1830
Ship	State	Description
Agnes	United Kingdom	The ship was wrecked at Belfast, County Down.
Alexander	United Kingdom	The ship was wrecked near Whitehaven, Cumberland. Her crew were rescued.
Flying Fish	United Kingdom	The ship sank in Larne Bay. She was on a voyage from Liverpool, Lancashire to Larne, County Antrim.

== 16 November ==
List of shipwrecks: 16 November 1830
Ship	State	Description
George	United Kingdom	The ship was wrecked near Orford, Suffolk. Her crew were rescued.
Lord Liverpool	(United Kingdom of Great Britain and Ireland) New South Wales	The ship was wrecked at Newcastle, New South Wales. She was on a voyage from Sydney to Newcastle.
Thaiss	United Kingdom	The ship sank at Great Yarmouth, Norfolk. Her crew were rescued by rocket apparatus.

== 17 November ==
List of shipwrecks: 17 November 1830
Ship	State	Description
Speedwell	United Kingdom	The ship foundered in the Firth of Tay with the loss of all hands.
Sprightly	United Kingdom	The ship was driven ashore on "Larmsor". Her crew were rescued.

== 18 November ==
List of shipwrecks: 18 November 1830
Ship	State	Description
Courier	United States	The ship was wrecked on Cape Sable Island, Nova Scotia, British North America. Her crew were rescued. She was on a voyage from Saint Petersburg, Russa to New York.
Eliza Anne	(United Kingdom of Great Britain and Ireland) Bahamas	The schooner departed from Cobh, County Cork for New Providence, New Jersey, United States. She was subsequently wrecked in Roches Bay with the loss of twelve lives.
Ord	United Kingdom	The brig came ashore and was severely damaged at Seaham, County Durham due to a navigational error. She was refloated on 11 January 1831 and taken in to Seaham.
Pliades	United Kingdom	The ship departed from Limerick for Brixham, Devon. No further trace, presumed foundered with the loss of all hands.

== 19 November ==
List of shipwrecks: 19 November 1830
Ship	State	Description
Catherine	(United Kingdom of Great Britain and Ireland) British North America	The ship was driven ashore and wrecked at Buenos Aires, Argentina. she was on a voyage from Halifax to Buenos Aires.
Eliza Knightley	United Kingdom	The ship was wrecked at Drogheda, County Louth. Her crew were rescued. She was on a voyage from Liverpool, Lancashire to Drogheda.
New Delight	United Kingdom	The ship was wrecked on the Bondicar Rocks, in the North Sea off the coast of Northumberland.
Raven	United Kingdom	The ship was wrecked at Drogheda. Her crew were rescued. She was on a voyage from Bangor, Caernarfonshire to Drogheda.
St George	United Kingdom	The Douglas Lifeboat going to the rescue of St. George. The paddle steamer was driven ashore and wrecked in Douglas Bay, Isle of Man. All on board were rescued, by the Douglas Lifeboat.

== 20 November ==
List of shipwrecks: 20 November 1830
Ship	State	Description
Acorn	United Kingdom	The ship was driven ashore on Islay, Inner Hebrides. She was on a voyage from Glasgow, Renfrewshire to Port Ellen, Islay.
Betsey	United Kingdom	The galiot was driven ashore in Loch Indaal. She was on a voyage from Glasgow to Ballyshannon, County Donegal.
Blackingston	United States	The ship was driven ashore and severely damaged at Galway. She was refloated on 1 December.
Catherine	United Kingdom	The ship was driven ashore on Islay. She was on a voyage from Irvine, Ayrshire to Londonderry.
Cordelia	United Kingdom	The brig was driven ashore at Galway.
De Hemina	Netherlands	The galiot was driven ashore in the Sound of Islay. She was on a voyage from Fisherrow, Lothian, United Kingdom to Liverpool, Lancashire, United Kingdom.
Edinburgh	United Kingdom	The schooner was driven ashore in Loch Indaal. She was on a voyage from Glasgow to Limerick.
Felicity	United Kingdom	The ship was driven ashore and wrecked near Kilrush, County Clare. She was on a voyage from Limerick to Glasgow.
Fingal	United Kingdom	The schooner was driven ashore in Loch Indaal. She was on a voyage from Westport, County Mayo to Glasgow.
Graham	United Kingdom	The ship was driven ashore in Loch Indaal. She was on a voyage from Glasgow to Limerick.
Harmony	United Kingdom	The ship was abandoned at sea. She was on a voyage from Tralee, County Kerry to Liverpool.
Hero	United Kingdom	The ship was driven ashore at Sligo.
Hero	United Kingdom	The ship was lost in Carmarthen Bay.
Helena	United Kingdom	The ship was driven ashore at Sligo.
Isabella	United Kingdom	The sloop was driven ashore in Loch Indaal. She was on a voyage from Glasgow to Coleraine, County Antrim.
Isabella	United Kingdom	The ship was driven ashore at "Longhope".
James	United Kingdom	The ship was driven ashore at Galway.
James and Archibald	United Kingdom	The ship was driven ashore at Galway.
James Daly	United Kingdom	The schooner was driven ashore in Loch Indaal. She was on a voyage from Glasgow to Faial, Azores, Portugal.
John and Mary	(United Kingdom of Great Britain and Ireland) British North America	The schooner was driven ashore on Jura, Inner Hebrides, United Kingdom. She was on a voyage from Ballina, County Mayo to Liverpool.
Lady Eleanor	United Kingdom	The ship was driven ashore on Islay.
Lady H. M. McKenzie	United Kingdom	The ship was driven ashore at Sligo.
Lady Hood	United Kingdom	The ship was driven ashore at Sligo.
Lady Vaughan	United Kingdom	The brig was driven ashore at Galway.
Lellias or Silia	United Kingdom	The ship was wrecked in Galway Bay. She was on a voyage from Troon, Ayrshire to Limerick.
Lily	United Kingdom	The ship was wrecked on the Black Rock, in the Irish Sea off Galway with the loss of two of her seven crew. She was refloated on 26 November and taken in to Galway.
Margaret	United Kingdom)	The brig was driven ashore in Loch Indaal. She was on a voyage from Glasgow to Limerick.
Margaret	United Kingdom	The schooner was driven ashore in Loch Indaal.
Martha	United Kingdom	The ship was driven ashore at Sligo.
Martin	United Kingdom	The brig was driven ashore and wrecked in Laggan Bay, Islay. Her crew were rescued. She was on a voyage from Bangor to Galway.
Mary	United Kingdom	The brig was wrecked in Ross Bay with the loss of nine of the fourteen people on board. She was on a voyage from Belfast, County Antrim to Harrington, Cumberland.
Nelson	United Kingdom	The schooner was driven ashore in Loch Indaal. She was on a voyage from Belfast to Donegal.
Ospray	United Kingdom	The schooner was driven ashore in Loch Indaal. She was on a voyage from Glasgow to Sligo.
Provost	United Kingdom	The ship was driven ashore at Galway.
Perseverance	United Kingdom	The ship was driven ashore on Islay. She was on a voyage from Glasgow to Islay.
Queen Adelaide	United Kingdom	The ship was wrecked at Galway with the loss of all hands.
Sarah	United Kingdom	The ship was driven ashore at Galway. She was later refloated.
Sisters	United Kingdom	The ship was driven ashore at Fraserburgh, Aberdeenshire.
Thetis	United Kingdom	The ship was driven ashore at Galway.
Tiffin	United Kingdom	The ship was driven ashore at Kilrush. She was on a voyage from Limerick to Liverpool.
Varro	United Kingdom	The sloop was wrecked on Jura, Hebrides. Her crew were rescued. She was on a voyage from Newry, County Antrim to London. She was later refloated and taken in to Greenock, Renfrewshire in a severely damaged condition, arriving on 20 December.
William and Henry	United Kingdom	The schooner was driven ashore in Loch Indaal. She was on a voyage from Glasgow to Ballyshannon. She was refloated in early January 1831.
Wolfe	United Kingdom	The sloop was driven ashore at Bowmore, Islay.

== 22 November ==
List of shipwrecks: 22 November 1830
Ship	State	Description
Friends	United Kingdom	The ship was driven ashore and wrecked on Rathlin Island, County Antrim.
Laurel	United Kingdom	The ship was driven ashore and severely damaged at "Lettoch", Inverness-shire.
Maria	United Kingdom	The ship was driven ashore south of Höganäs, Sweden.
Nelson	United Kingdom	The ship was driven ashore at Galway.

== 23 November ==
List of shipwrecks: 23 November 1830
Ship	State	Description
Flora	Netherlands	The ship foundered off Kristiansand, Vest-Agder, Norway. Her crew were rescued. She was on a voyage from Arkhangelsk, Russia to Amsterdam, North Holland.
Fly	United Kingdom	The ship departed from Falmouth, Cornwall for Faial, Azores, Portugal. No further trace, presumed foundered with the loss of all hands.
Tobago	United Kingdom	The ship was lost on this date whilst on a voyage from Memel, Prussia to London.
Zeeluat	Bremen	The ship was wrecked at Nexø, Denmark. She was on a voyage from Saint Petersburg, Russia to Bremen.

== 24 November ==
List of shipwrecks: 24 November 1830
Ship	State	Description
Harmony	United Kingdom	The ship was wrecked in Loch Indaal.
Henry and Thomas	United Kingdom	The ship was wrecked on Gigha.
Lochswilly	United Kingdom	The ship was wrecked in Loch Indaal.
Perseverance	United Kingdom	The ship was wrecked in Loch Indaal.
Mary	United Kingdom	The ship was sighted off the Norwegian coast whilston a voyage from Danzig, Prussia to Weymouth, Dorset. No further trace, presumed foundered with the loss of all hands.

== 25 November ==
List of shipwrecks: 25 November 1830
Ship	State	Description
Alert	United Kingdom	The ship was driven ashore at Oban, Argyllshire.
Clamentina	United Kingdom	The ship was driven ashore in Blackwell Bay.
Echo	United States	The brig was wrecked on Cape Cod, Massachusetts.
Ellen	United Kingdom	The ship was driven ashore at Wicklow. She was on a voyage from Wexford to Dublin.
George	United Kingdom	The ship was driven ashore in the Sound of Kernara.

== 26 November ==
List of shipwrecks: 26 November 1830
Ship	State	Description
Arabella	United Kingdom	The ship was driven ashore and wrecked at Horsey, Norfolk. Her crew were rescued.
Clifton	United Kingdom	The brig ran aground on the Corton Sand, in the North Sea off the coast of Suffolk. All ten people on board were rescued by the Lowestoft Lifeboat. Clifton broke up on 2 December. She was on a voyage from Hamburg to London.
Kent	United Kingdom	The ship was wrecked near Tenby, Pembrokeshire. She was on a voyage from Fernando Po to Liverpool, Lancashire.

== 27 November ==
List of shipwrecks: 27 November 1830
Ship	State	Description
Aurora	Lübeck	The ship was driven ashore at Domesnes, Norway. She was on a voyage from Riga, Russia to Lübeck.
Earl of Fife	United Kingdom	The ship was driven ashore near Christiansand, Norway. Her crew were rescued. She was on a voyage from Riga to Aberdeen.
Helena Therese	Hamburg	The ship was driven ashore and wrecked near Harwich, Essex, United Kingdom with the loss of but one of her crew. The survivor was rescued by John (United Kingdom). Helena Therese was on a voyage from Altona, Hamburg to Havana, Cuba.
Helios	flag unknown	The ship was driven ashore on Ameland, Friesland, Netherlands. Her crew were rescued. She was on a voyage from Copenhagen, Denmark to Amsterdam, North Holland, Netherlands.
Perfect	United States	The ship was wrecked on the "Biddy Island". She was on a voyage from Boston, Massachusetts to Charleston, South Carolina.

== 28 November ==
List of shipwrecks: 28 November 1830
Ship	State	Description
Elizabeth	United Kingdom	The ship, a schooner or sloop, was driven ashore and wrecked at Sizewell, Suffolk. Her crew were either rescued or all lost, but the ship's dog was rescued. She was on a voyage from Leith, Lothian to London.
Vineyard	United States	The ship was destroyed by fire off New York. She was on a voyage from New Orleans, Louisiana to Philadelphia, Pennsylvania.

== 29 November ==
List of shipwrecks: 29 November 1830
Ship	State	Description
Desiré de la Paix	France	The ship was wrecked in the Isles of Scilly, United Kingdom.
Endeavour	United Kingdom	The ship departed from Dartmouth, Devon for São Miguel, Azores, Portugal. No further trace, presumed foundered with the loss of all hands.
Thomas	United Kingdom	The barque was abandoned in the Atlantic Ocean. Her crew were rescued by Julius Caesar (United Kingdom). Thomas was on a voyage from Liverpool to Philadelphia, Pennsylvania, United States.

== 30 November ==
List of shipwrecks: 30 November 1830
Ship	State	Description
Eliza Anne	(United Kingdom of Great Britain and Ireland) Bahamas	The schooner was wrecked in the Irish Sea off Cork Head, County Cork, United Kingdom with the loss of all twelve people on board.
Samuel Parker	United Kingdom	The ship was abandoned in the Baltic Sea. Her crew were rescued. She was on a voyage from Saint Petersburg, Russia to London.

== Unknown date ==
List of shipwrecks: Unknown date 1830
Ship	State	Description
Ann	United Kingdom	The ship was driven ashore and wrecked in Dundrum Bay. She was on a voyage from Newport, Monmouthshire to Aberdeen.
Catherine	United Kingdom	The ship was driven ashore on the Whiteford Sands, Glamorgan. She was refloated on 2 December.
Edward	United Kingdom	The ship was wrecked on Grand Cayman in late November. All on board were rescued. She was on a voyage from Belfast, County Down to New Orleans, Louisiana, United States.
John Bull	(United Kingdom of Great Britain and Ireland) New South Wales	The whaler was sighted off "Melanti". No further trace, presumed foundered with the loss of all hands.
Lewis Joseph	France	The chasse-marée was wrecked on the coast of Ireland. Her five crew were rescued by the brig Amity (United Kingdom).
Tamehumeha	(United Kingdom of Great Britain and Ireland) New Hebrides	The brig was wrecked on Sandwich Island.
Thomas	United Kingdom	The ship was wrecked on the Manicoogen Shoals, in the Saint Lawrence River, British North America. Her crew were rescued.
Venus	(United Kingdom of Great Britain and Ireland) British North America	The ship was wrecked in the Fox River, Nova Scotia on or before 4 November.
