= List of shipwrecks in April 1825 =

The list of shipwrecks in April 1825 includes some ships sunk, wrecked or otherwise lost during April 1825.

== 3 April ==
List of shipwrecks: 3 April 1825
Ship	State	Description
Independence	United States	The ship sprang a leak and was abandoned by her crew. She was on a voyage from Philadelphia, Pennsylvania to Maracaibo, Gran Colombia.

== 6 April ==
List of shipwrecks: 6 April 1825
Ship	State	Description
Hiram	United States	The ship was wrecked at Ocracoke, North Carolina. Her crew were rescued. She was on a voyage from Boston, Massachusetts to Jamaica.
Industry	United Kingdom	The ship was driven ashore on the Sherry of Ness, Orkney Islands. She was on a voyage from Trondheim, Norway to Portaferry, County Antrim. Industry was refloated on 14 April and taken in to Stromness, Orkney Islands, for repairs.
Mechanic	United Kingdom	The ship ran aground in the River Shannon. She was on a voyage from Limerick to Baltimore, Maryland, United States. Mechanic was refloated the next day and taken in to Limerick for repairs.

== 7 April ==
List of shipwrecks: 7 April 1825
Ship	State	Description
Atlanta	United Kingdom	The ship sank off Harwich, Essex. She was refloated on 18 June and beached.
Reindeer	United Kingdom	The ship was wrecked on Heneaga. She was on a voyage from Wilmington, Delaware to Jamaica.

== 8 April ==
List of shipwrecks: 8 April 1825
Ship	State	Description
Syren	United Kingdom	The ship was driven ashore and wrecked at Southend, Essex. She was on a voyage from London to Cork and Quebec City, Lower Canada, British North America.

== 9 April ==
List of shipwrecks: 9 April 1825
Ship	State	Description
Royal George	United Kingdom	The whaler was lost at Wahoo (Oahu).

== 11 April ==
List of shipwrecks: 11 April 1825
Ship	State	Description
Eglington	United Kingdom	The ship was wrecked at St. Ann's Head, Pembrokeshire. Her crew were rescued. She was on a voyage from Messina, Sicily to Glasgow, Renfrewshire.
Maria Agnetha	Netherlands	The ship was driven ashore on the coast of Surinam.

== 12 April ==
List of shipwrecks: 12 April 1825
Ship	State	Description
Boldon	United Kingdom	The ship was wrecked on the Sandhammer Reef, in the Baltic Sea. Her crew were rescued.
Julian	United Kingdom	The ship was holed by her anchor at Liverpool, Lancashire and was wrecked.

== 13 April ==
List of shipwrecks: 13 April 1825
Ship	State	Description
Jane	United Kingdom	The ship was wrecked on Ertholmene, Denmark. She was on a voyage from London to Danzig.
William	United Kingdom	The ship was abandoned in the Atlantic Ocean. She was on a voyage from Saint Lucia to Halifax, Nova Scotia, British North America.

== 14 April ==
List of shipwrecks: 14 April 1825
Ship	State	Description
Comus	United Kingdom	The ship was wrecked on Lundy Island, Devon. Her crew were rescued. She was on a voyage from Jersey, Channel Islands to Swansea, Glamorgan.
Paul Frederick	Rostock	The galiot sprang a leak and was abandoned in the North Sea.
Teche	United States	Teche. The steamboat was set on fire and sunk in the Mississippi River by a boiler explosion with the loss of three lives. Another twelve to eighteen people died when a boat from the steamboat Washington (United States) with survivors on board capsized.

== 15 April ==
List of shipwrecks: 15 April 1825
Ship	State	Description
Drie Gesusters	France	The galiot was wrecked on the coast of Jutland. She was on a voyage from Brest, Finistère to a Baltic port.
Henry	United Kingdom	The ship was lost in the Torres Strait. Her crew were rescued. She was on a voyage from Sydney to Batavia.

== 16 April ==
List of shipwrecks: 16 April 1825
Ship	State	Description
Barbara	United Kingdom	The ship was lost in Torekov Bay. Her crew were rescued. She was on a voyage from South Shields, County Durham to Memel, Prussia.
Britannia	United Kingdom	The ship was lost near Torekov, Sweden. Her crew were rescued. She was on a voyage from London to Danzig.
Caroline	United Kingdom	The ship was driven ashore near Helsingborg, Sweden. She was on a voyage from London to Pillau, Prussia.
Eleonora	Prussia	The ship was lost in the Swinebottoms. She was on a voyage from London to Pillau.
Flora	United Kingdom	The ship was lost in Torekov Bay. Her crew were rescued. She was on a voyage from King's Lynn, Norfolk to Memel.
Janets	United Kingdom	The ship was lost near Torekov. Her crew were rescued.
Liebe	Danzig	The ship was lost in Torekov Bay. Her crew were rescued.
Margaret	United Kingdom	The ship was run down and sunk in the North Sea off Flamborough Head, Yorkshire by Sally (United Kingdom). Her crew were rescued.
Mary & Elizabeth	United Kingdom	The sloop was driven ashore and wrecked at Rattray Head, Aberdeenshire. Her crew were rescued. She was on a voyage from Inverness to Aberdeen.
Neptunus	Danzig	The ship was driven ashore near Landskrona, Sweden. She was on a voyage from London to Danzig.
Oscar	United Kingdom	The ship was lost on Gotland, Sweden. Her crew were rescued. She was on a voyage from Leith, Lothian to Saint Petersburg, Russia.

== 17 April ==
List of shipwrecks: 17 April 1825
Ship	State	Description
Alexander de Bruyer	Stettin	The ship foundered in the Skaggerak on or about this date. She was on voyage from London, United Kingdom to a Baltic port.
Christina Maria	Sweden	The ship capsized off Bornholm, Denmark. She was on a voyage from Kalmar to Copenhagen, Denmark.
Eliza	United Kingdom	The ship was driven ashore near "Polski". She was on a voyage from Copenhagen to Königsburg, Prussia.
Jane	United Kingdom	The ship was driven ashore at Helsingborg, Sweden. She was on a voyage from London to Riga, Russia.
Mercurius	Hamburg	The ship was abandoned in the North Sea between Heligoland and Wangeroog, Kingdom of Hanover. She was on a voyage from Bordeaux, Gironde, France to Hamburg.
Minerva	Brazil	The full-rigged ship was wrecked 6 leagues (18 nautical miles (33 km)) from Bahia. She was on a voyage from Rio de Janeiro to Lisbon, Portugal.
Thomas Hodgson	United Kingdom	The ship was driven ashore at Pillau, Prussia. She was refloated on 24 July and taken in to Pillau.
Vrow Gerken	Netherlands	The ship foundered in the Zuiderzee off Hoorn, North Holland. Her crew were rescued. She was on a voyage from Bordeaux, Gironde, France to Hamburg.

== 18 April ==
List of shipwrecks: 18 April 1825
Ship	State	Description
Betsey	United Kingdom	The ship was lost off the coast of Jutland. Her crew were rescued. She was on a voyage from London to Memel, Prussia.
Eliza	(United Kingdom of Great Britain and Ireland) Jamaica	The drogging sloop was wrecked in Rodney Hall Bay.
Mars	Danzig	The ship was abandoned in the North Sea off Baltrum, Kingdom of Hanover. Her crew were rescued by America (United States). Mars was on a voyage from London, United Kingdom to Danzig. She subsequently came ashore on Baltrum and was wrecked.

== 19 April ==
List of shipwrecks: 19 April 1825
Ship	State	Description
Augustina	Norway	The ship was discovered abandoned in the North Sea 20 nautical miles (37 km) off Goeree, Zeeland, Netherlands. She was on a voyage from Caen, Calvados, France to Christiansand. Augustina was taken in to Ostend, West Flanders, Netherlands.
Goede Hoop	Netherlands	The ship was driven ashore on the coast of Jutland.

== 20 April ==
List of shipwrecks: 20 April 1825
Ship	State	Description
Mary	United Kingdom	The ship caught fire at North Shields, County Durham and was scuttled.

== 21 April ==
List of shipwrecks: 21 April 1825
Ship	State	Description
Asia	Hamburg	The ship ran aground off Callantsoog, Groningen, Netherlands and was abandoned by her crew. She was on a voyage from China to Hamburg. Asia was refloated on 19 May and taken into the Nieuw Diep.
Julia	(United Kingdom of Great Britain and Ireland) Guernsey	The ship was wrecked at Gorey, Jersey, Channel Islands.

== 23 April ==
List of shipwrecks: 23 April 1825
Ship	State	Description
Dorinda	United Kingdom	The cutter foundered in the Irish Sea off Dublin with the loss of all hands.
Freyheiden	Denmark	The ship was wrecked on the Haisborough Sands, in the North Sea off the coast of Norfolk, United Kingdom. Her crew were rescued.

== 25 April ==
List of shipwrecks: 25 April 1825
Ship	State	Description
Princess of Wales	(United Kingdom of Great Britain and Ireland) Jamaica	The cutter was wrecked at Bahía Honda, Cuba. Her crew were rescued.

== 26 April ==
List of shipwrecks: 26 April 1825
Ship	State	Description
Catharina	Stettin	The ship was abandoned off the coast of Jutland. She was on a voyage from London, United Kingdom to Stettin. Catharina was subsequently taken in to Helsingør, Denmark, by Edward (Prussia).
Maria Catharina	Rostock	The ship ran aground and was wrecked off the "Sloot". She was on a voyage from Rostock to Amsterdam, North Holland, Netherlands.

== 27 April ==
List of shipwrecks: 27 April 1825
Ship	State	Description
Lady Ann	United Kingdom	The ship caught fire at North Shields, County Durham and was scuttled.

== 28 April ==
List of shipwrecks: 28 April 1825
Ship	State	Description
Blackbird	United Kingdom	The ship was wrecked north of Wexford. Her crew were rescued. She was on a voyage from Cork to Glasgow, Renfrewshire.
Claremont	United Kingdom	The ship was wrecked on Water Key, off the coast of Haiti. Her crew were rescued. She was on a voyage from London to Jamaica.

== 30 April ==
List of shipwrecks: 30 April 1825
Ship	State	Description
Elizabeth & Jane	United Kingdom	The ship sank at Margate, Kent.
James	United Kingdom	The ship was wrecked near Point Lepreau, New Brunswick, British North America. Her crew were rescued. She was on a voyage from Jamaica to Saint John, New Brunswick.

== Unknown date ==
List of shipwrecks: Unknown date 1825
Ship	State	Description
Anna Charlotte	Stettin	The ship foundered off Anholt, Denmark. Her crew were rescued. She was on a voyage from Stettin to London, United Kingdom.
Catharine	United Kingdom	The ship sprang a leak and was abandoned in the Atlantic Ocean. Her crew were rescued by Three Sisters (United Kingdom).
Diana	United Kingdom	The ship sprang a leak and was abandoned in the Atlantic Ocean. Her crew were rescued by Indian Chief (United States). Diana was on a voyage from Savannah, Georgia, United States to Liverpool, Lancashire.
Doris	United Kingdom	The ship was wrecked on Heneaga. Her crew were rescued. She was on a voyage from Saint Domingo to Falmouth, Cornwall.
Hebe	United Kingdom	The smack departed from Jersey, Channel Islands for Colchester, Essex in late April. No further trace, presumed foundered with the loss of all hands.
Henry	United States	The ship was wrecked on Dry Tortuga. She was on a voyage from New Orleans, Louisiana to Liverpool.
Jonge Frederick	Netherlands	The ship was driven ashore on Saltholm, Denmark. She was on a voyage from Amsterdam, North Holland to Memel, Prussia.
Margaret	United Kingdom	The ship was in collision with May off Ballina, County Mayo and was lost. She was on a voyage from Ballina to Liverpool.
Mary & Elizabeth	United Kingdom	The ship was wrecked on Mayaguana, Bahamas. She was on a voyage from Jamaica to Quebec City, Lower Canada, British North America.
O'Cain	United States	The ship was wrecked near the mouth of the Maule River. Her crew were rescued.
Opinion	United Kingdom	The ship was driven ashore near Schmolsin, Prussia before 25 April. She was on a voyage from London to Danzig.
Oscar	Sweden	The ship struck a rock off Capo Passero, Sicily and foundered. Her crew were rescued by Pacific (United Kingdom).
Place	United Kingdom	The ship foundered off Polperro, Cornwall in late April. Her crew were rescued. She was on a voyage from Swansea, Glamorgan to Fowey, Cornwall.
Pollux	Danzig	The ship sprang a leak and was abandoned in the North Sea.
Sarah	United Kingdom	The ship was driven ashore at the mouth of the Mississippi River. She was on a voyage from Liverpool to New Orleans, Louisiana, United States.
Saunders Hill	United Kingdom	The ship foundered in the Kattegat before 23 April with the loss of all hands. She was on a voyage from Messina, Sicily to Saint Petersburg, Russia.
Thomas Hodgson	United Kingdom	The ship was driven ashore at Pillau, Prussia. She was on a voyage from Pillau to Hull, Yorkshire. Thomas Hodgson was refloated on 24 July.
