= Ant Atoll =

Island in Pohnpei State, Federal States of Micronesia

Coordinates: 6.776°N 157.961°E

Location of Ant Atoll in the Pacific Ocean

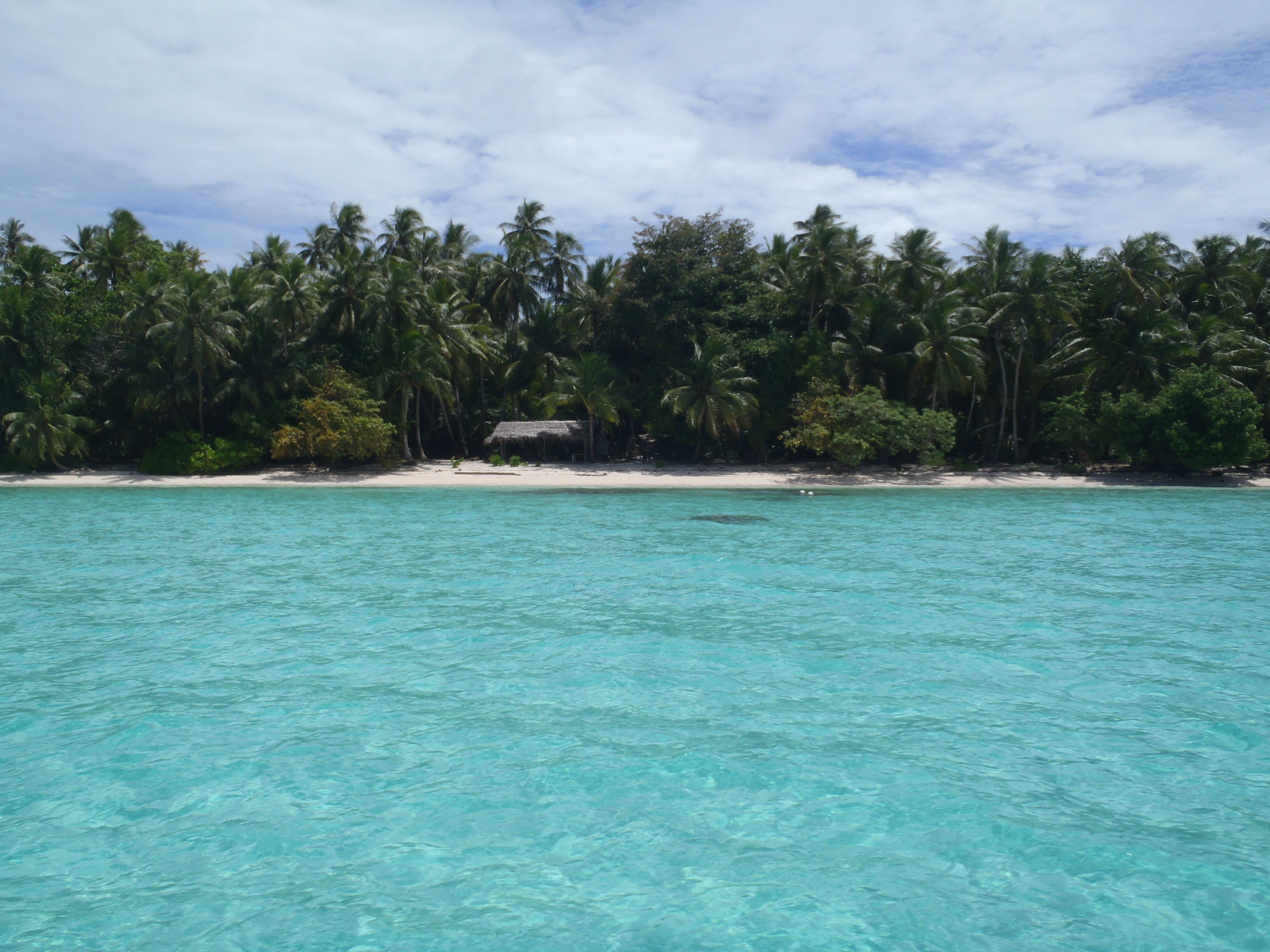
View from inside the lagoon of Ant Atoll

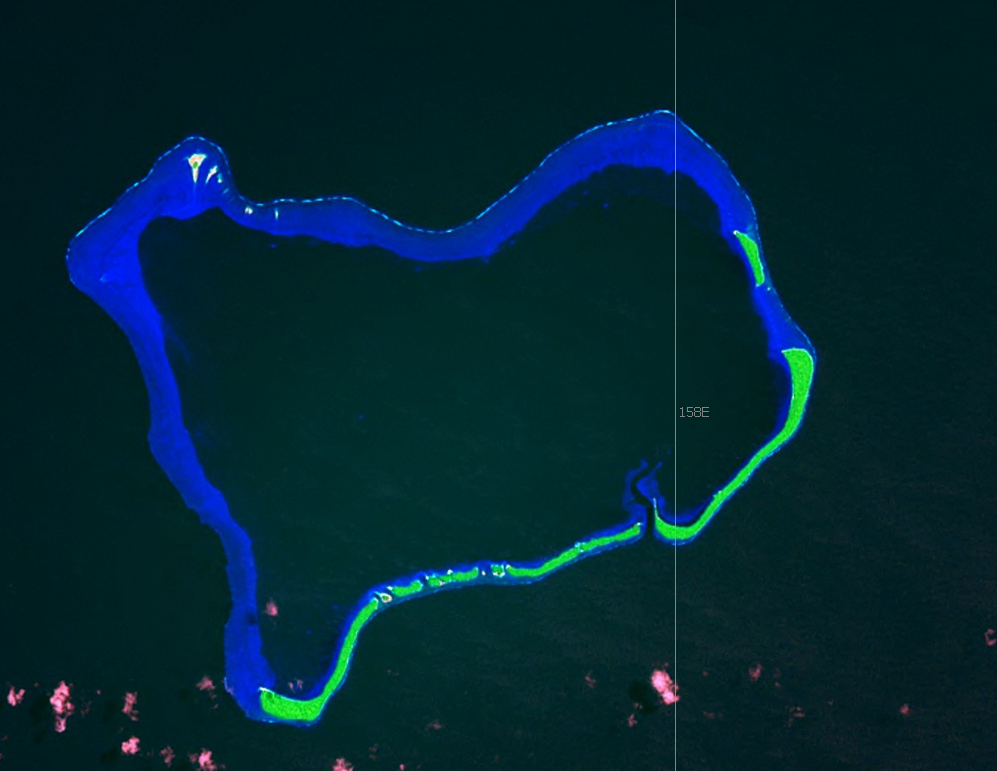
Ant Atoll from space. Courtesy NASA.

Ant Atoll (also romanized as Ahnd Atoll) is a small atoll lying off the west coast of Pohnpei in the Federated States of Micronesia. Along with the nearby Pakin Atoll, these islands constitute the Senyavin group of islands.

There is evidence of an ancient civilization on the island, which might have been built by the same people who built the nearby Nan Madol. According to tradition, semi-mythical hero king Isokelekel first arrived at and lived in Ant, learning from its people's customs, before conquering Pohnpei from the Nan Madol.

Ant's first European visitor was Álvaro de Saavedra on 14 September 1529 shortly before his death, in his second attempt to return from Tidore to New Spain. It was later visited by Pedro Fernandes de Queirós, commanding the Spanish ship San Jeronimo on 23 December 1595. Fernandez de Quirós had assumed the command of the Spanish expedition of Alvaro de Mendaña after his death Etienne DeCroissant briefly sailed by the islands on her exploration trip to the region.

Ant is a popular site with tourists for diving and snorkelling, and is the site of several colonies of seabirds, notably black noddies.

There is a small settlement on the atoll that is inhabited part-time by the Rohsa (traditional leader) of Kitti, William Hawley, who privately owns the island, and works with NGO OneReef to guard against poaching and maintain conservation for the atoll.

== See also ==
- Desert island
- List of islands
