= Pakin Atoll =

Island in Pohnpei State, Federal States of Micronesia

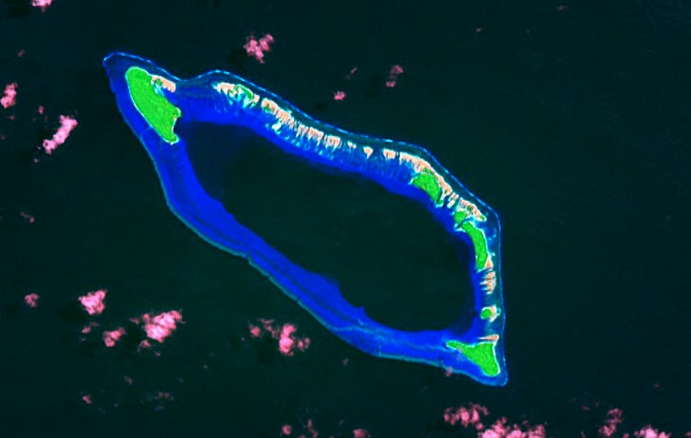
- Pakin Atoll from space. Courtesy NASA.

- Location within Pacific Ocean

Geography
- Coordinates: 7.059°N 157.805°E
- Archipelago: Senyavin group of islands

Administration
- Federated States of Micronesia

Demographics
- Population: 90-100

Pakin Atoll is a small atoll lying off the northwest coast of Pohnpei in the Federated States of Micronesia. Along with the nearby Ant Atoll these islands constitute the Senyavin group of islands.

Pakin has a population of around 90-100 people, all of whom are members of the diasporic Mortlockese community in Sokehs. The community is represented by traditional leadership (Sounirek Pakein) and is recognized as a non-government organization under the name "Pakin Community Association" (PCA). The by-laws and articles of pledge of the PCA were signed on August 28, 2007. Pakin Elementary School and a large Catholic church are located on the largest islet of Nikahlap. The other inhabited islets of Pakin Atoll include Painpwel, Wesetik, Mwanid, and Olamwin. The atoll is a popular site with tourists for diving and snorkelling.

== History ==
The first recorded sighting by Europeans was by the Spanish vessel "San Jeronimo", commanded by female explorer Isabel Barreto on 21 December 1595 with Pedro Fernández de Quirós as pilot.
