= Temwen Island =

Island in the Federated States of Micronesia

Coordinates: 6°51′N 158°19′E

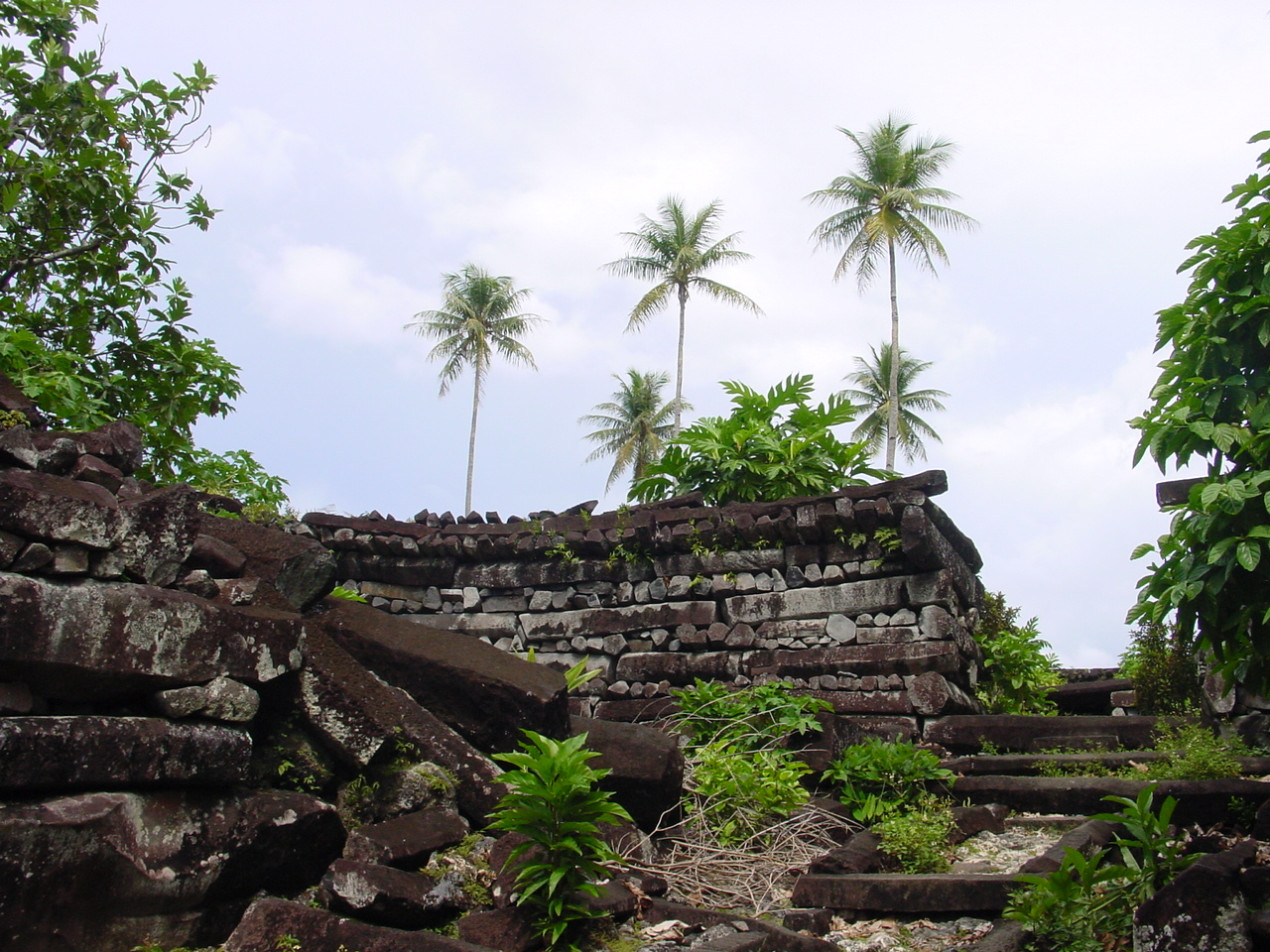

Geography
- Location: Pacific Ocean
- Archipelago: Caroline Islands
- Area: 3 km^{2} (1.2 sq mi)

Administration
- Federated States of Micronesia

Temwen Island is a small island of 3 square kilometers off the southeastern coast off the island of Pohnpei in the Federated States of Micronesia.

== Nan Madol ==
It is best known as the location of the ruined city of Nan Madol, the capital of the Saudeleur dynasty until 1628, which consisted of a series of artificially constructed islets off Temwen's southern coast.

Along with the rest of Pohnpei, it forms a large inlet called Madolenihmw Bay.

== See also ==
- Saudeleur Dynasty#Society
