= Isokelekel =

Pohnpeian semi-mythical hero warrior and demigod

Isokelekel was a semi-mythical hero warrior and demigod who founded pre-modern Pohnpei sometime in the 1500s to the early 1600s. He invaded the island, ended the oppressive rule of the Saudeleur dynasty, and instituted the decentralized chiefdom (nahnmwarki) system that has survived through modern times.

== Background ==
Isokelekel (Pohnpeian: "shining noble", "wonderful king"), was a semi-mythical son of the Pohnpeian god Nansapwe and Nansapwe's clanswoman, Lipahnmei, who came to Pohnpei from Katau. "Katau" is a Pohnpeian term referring to the east, although it is unclear where specifically. Some say "katau" is a reference to the "sky world". Many scholars have also come to the conclusion that Isokelekel hails from Kosrae. However, based on the absence of Kosrae's location from contact-era navigational lore, the Kosraens' lack of open ocean sailing skills, and the lack of noticeable Kosraen influence on the Pohnpei language, Isokelekel is unlikely to have come from Kosrae. It is likely that when referring to katau, people are referencing a mythological place. However, based on a number Pohnpei informants, he may have arrived from the Marshall Islands or Kiribati.

With the help of the indigenous people of Pohnpei, Isokelekel conquered the Saudeleur dynasty of Pohnpei (an island in the modern Federated States of Micronesia) sometime between the early 16th or 17th century. (Note: Legend generally dates the invasion in the 1500s, however archaeologists date ruins to c. 1628.) Isokelekel is considered the father of modern Pohnpei.

There is great variation among sources for the exact events before and during the invasion of Pohnpei; there are at least 13 differing accounts of the war published. In most versions of the Isokelekel legend, the Saudeleur rule had become oppressive under its abusive centralized social system, and its lords had offended the Thunder God Nan Sapwe, sealing the fate of the dynasty. Pohnpeian culture is heavily autonomous and decentralized, and quibbling directly and publicly over variations is considered bad form. The differences among the many accounts are further attributed to a wide range of cultural phenomena, from kava social groups to clan affiliation. Accordingly, any preferred version is generally the product of a measure of self-interest and autonomy.

Modern chiefs of Pohnpei trace their lineage to Isokelekel, and according to this legend, modern Pohnpeians are descendants of Isokelekel's invasion party.

Some variants of the myth in Kosrae name this hero Nanparadak, with features closer to Ulithian tales of the same archetype. In Pohnpeian oral histories, Nanparadak is Isokelekel's lieutenant.

== Origins ==
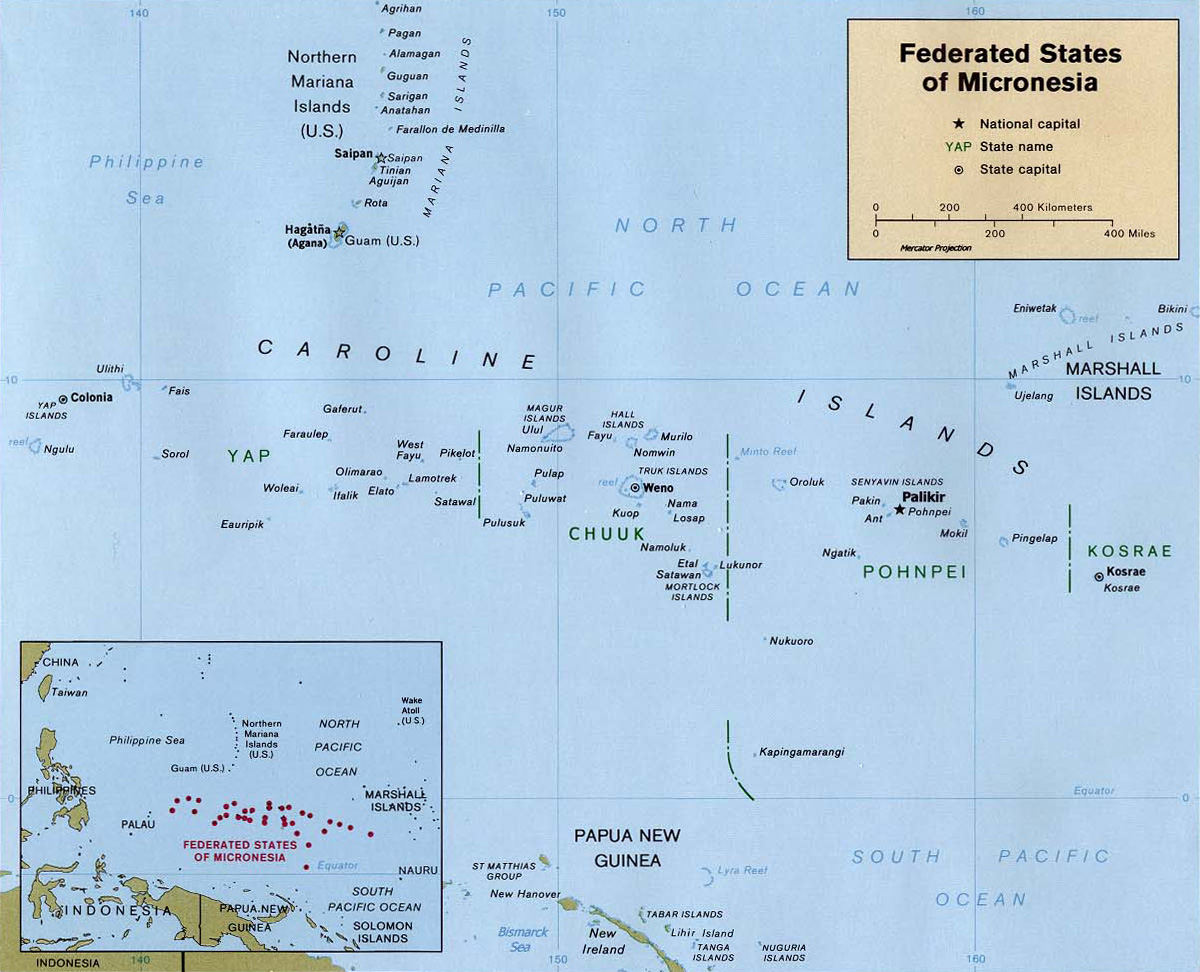
The eastern Caroline Islands, showing Pohnpei and Kosrae.

According to most versions of Isokelekel's legendary birth, his father is the Thunder God Nansapwe. Nansapwe had committed adultery with the wife of the Saudeleur lord. In anger, the Saudeleur lord set out to capture Nansapwe. Some versions include that the ruler had also incensed other gods of the Pohnpeian pantheon and insulted a high priest who prophesied the Saudeleur's downfall. These offenses, as well as the oppressive land ownership and tribute system of the Saudeleur, drew the ire of gods, humans, and animals alike.

Nansapwe, offended by the Saudeleur, left Pohnpei for an island in "downwind Katau" (east of Pohnpei). Certain versions indicate the Thunder God fled to the sky world of East Katau. Having fled, he impregnated a barren human of his own Dipwenpahnmei (Under-the-breadfruit-tree) clan named Lipahnmei by feeding her a lime. This incestuous union produced the semi-divine Isokelekel, who in the womb knew his destiny of vengeance.

Several extremely variant versions omit Isokelekel's divine paternity altogether, focusing on a lapse of cultural norms on the part of the Saudeleur in failing to provide food to Isokelekel when he arrives. In these versions, he is sometimes even accorded native Pohnpeian origins, and avenges the death of his brother, as opposed to the shame of his godly father. In other versions, Isokelekel is the product of a youth deified by the Thunder God and a Dipwenpahnmei human or a pair of brothers avenging the murder of their father by the Saudeleur.

Even though Isokelekel's father was usually regarded as a Pohnpeian deity, Isokelekel was decidedly foreign. He is described in legend as dark-skinned, and "savage". Brown (1907) posits that Isokelekel was perhaps of Papuasian descent. His origins are often described as southern, or "downwind".

In certain variations, Isokelekel first happens upon Pohnpei while fishing, and in some he is scared off by the massive settlements, returning later to conquer the island.

== Invasion of Pohnpei ==
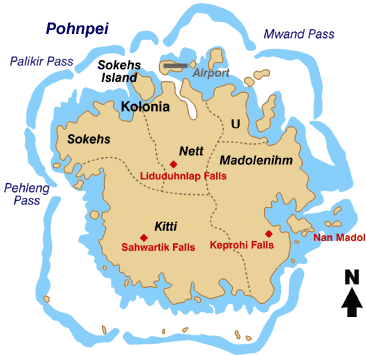
Municipality map of Pohnpei

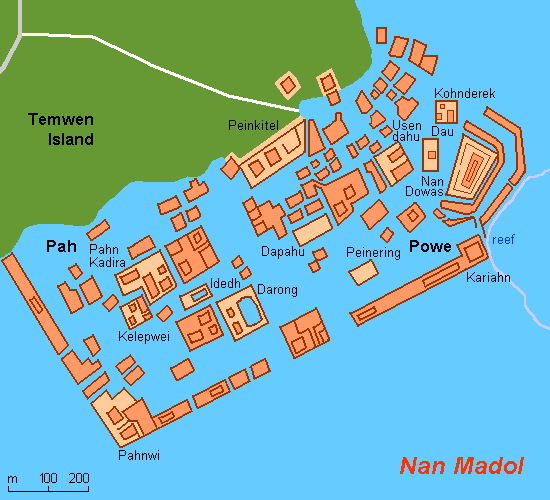
Nan Madol complex

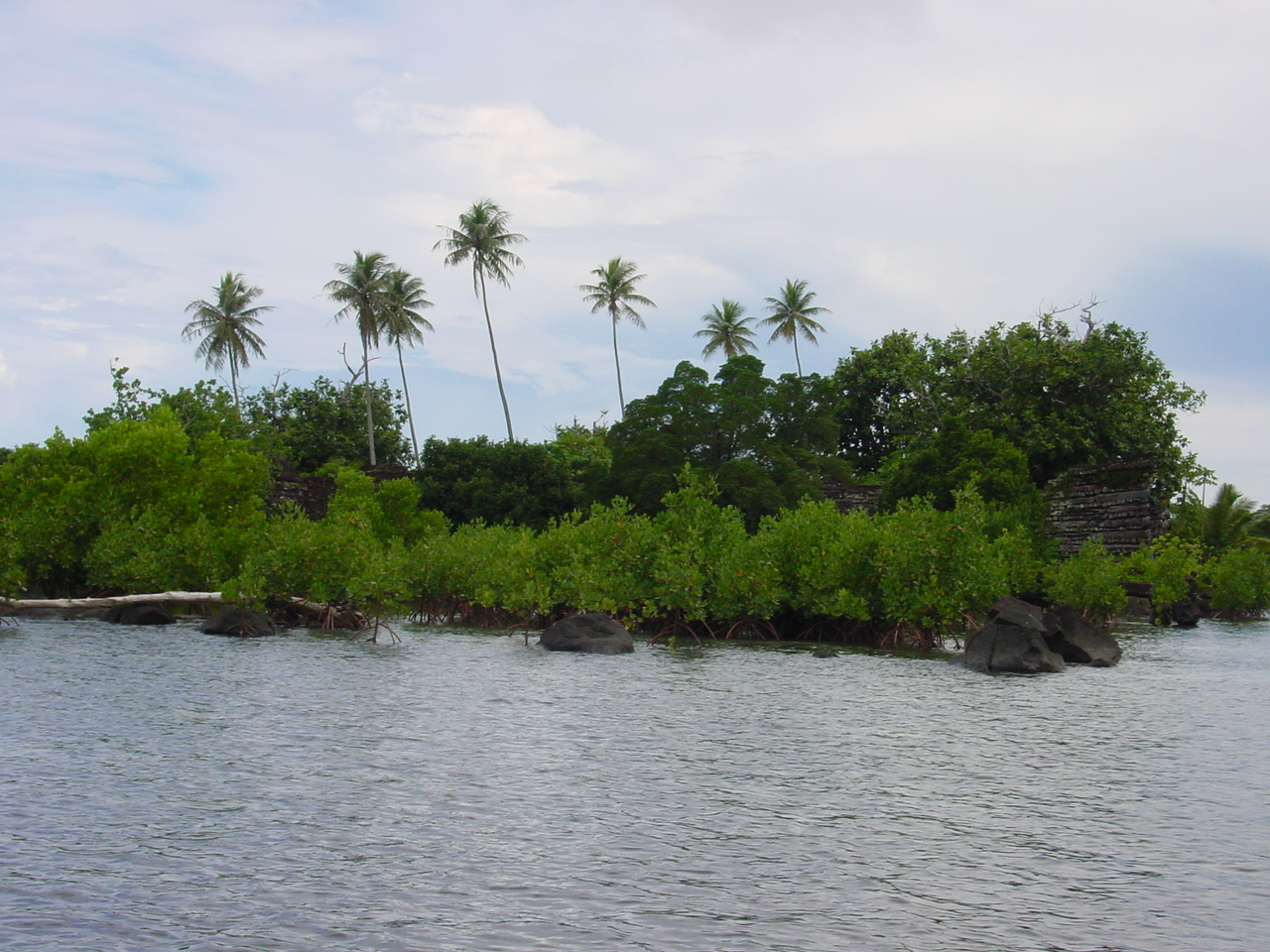
Nan Madol shoreline view

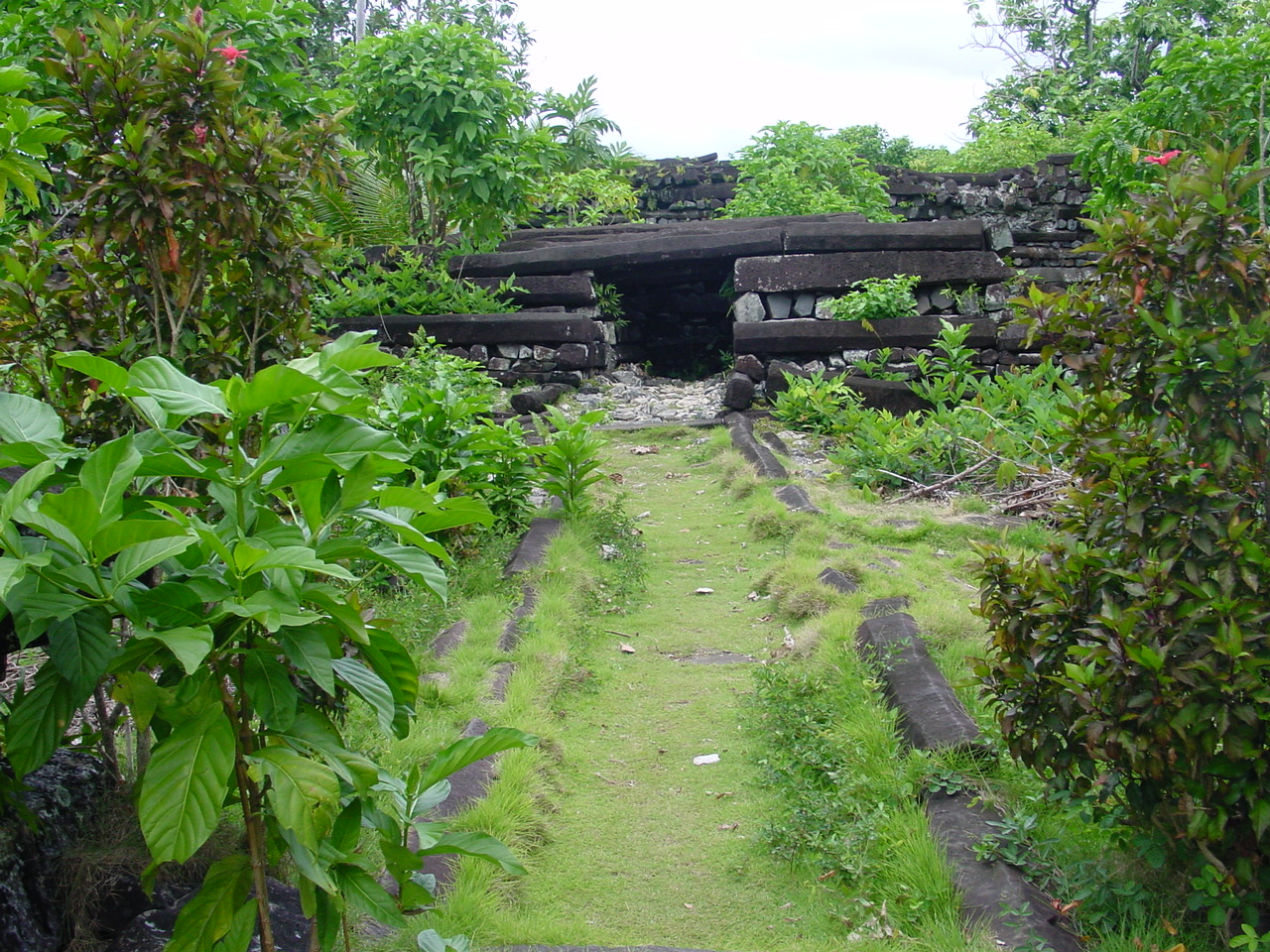
Nan Madol interior entrance

As an adult, Isokelekel set sail with 333 men, women, and children with the secret intention of conquering Pohnpei. The embarkment was consecrated by human sacrifice, a ritual widespread in Polynesian culture, but altogether rare in Pohnpeian history.

According to tradition, Isokelekel stopped in several places throughout the eastern Caroline Islands en route to Pohnpei, including Ant Atoll near Kitti, Losap in the Mortlocks, and Pingelap. According to some versions, it is on Ant Atoll that Isokelekel learns from his mother, a bird, an elderly lover, or by divination that his mission is to conquer Pohnpei. The canoe of invaders first entered Pohnpeian territory through a channel near Kehpara, a reef island near Kitti. From Kitti, Isokelekel circumnavigated Pohnpei in a clockwise direction, a theme of Pohnpeian mythology. Isokelekel stopped in Palikir, where he was offered leftover lihli (breadfruit pudding), a gesture forbidden toward high-ranking persons, earning Pohnpei the moniker Sapwen luh Pohnpei (Land of Leftovers Pohnpei). On his way to Nan Madol, Isokelekel received breadfruit kernels from the chief of Ant Atoll. In their culture, breadfruit kernels were the meal of warriors about to battle, and the offering constituted an invitation to do battle with the Saudeleur. While on Ant Island, Isokelekel entered a romantic relationship with a native woman named Likamadau ("Woman Who Gives Thought"), demonstrating his intention to cultivate close ties with Pohnpeians and oppose only the Saudeleur. Minor localized versions of the Isokelekel myth include that the invasion party sailed past certain areas because local gods protected them. At Nahrihnnahnsapwe, a small reef island near Nan Madol, Isokelekel performed rites to reaffirm his intent to conquer Pohnpei. The invasion party waited for an invitation to enter at Ewenkep, a break in the reef near Mall Islet south of Nanmadol. The Saudeleur lord Saudemwohl was unaware the son of the Thunder God was aboard, however, he sent a fleet to welcome the visitors, receiving them as guests at Kalapuel, Nan Madol, offshore of the main island of Pohnpei.

According to many versions, war broke out at Nan Madol after playing between local children and those from Isokelekel's canoe escalated into a fight. In another version, Isokelekel had his lieutenant provoke a local warrior at a prearranged encounter. Other accounts hold that Isokelekel staged an insurrection after winning the trust of his hosts, and with help from the oppressed locals. Another says that upon seeing the fortifications at Nan Madol, Isokelekel decided to withdraw, but was aided by a scorned and outcast woman from the ruling Saudeleur family. In some versions, Isokelekel's warriors are aided by hidden weapons that suddenly appear.

One prominent event during the war was the throwing of a spear through the foot of Isokelekel's lieutenant during his retreat, however, the thrower and the identity of the lieutenant vary among versions of the legend. Some state the lieutenant, named Nanparadak or Nahnapas, drove his spear into his foot to anchor it amid the retreat to rally the invaders. Others say Isokelekel himself threw the spear.

The tide of war reversed several times but ended against the Saudeleur, who retreated with his army into the main island of Pohnpei. In some versions, Isokelekel lost an eye in his conquest of Nan Madol. As the Saudeleur lord retreated, his lieutenant cast a stone at Isokelekel, blinding and maiming him. Later, in admiration of his skill and gall, Isokelekel made this warrior his general, whose descendants today hold places of honor in ceremonial feasts beside Isokelekel's descendants. Most versions of the Isokelekel myth include a character called Lepen Moar, aide to the Saudeleur, though there is no consensus on his role. He variously fails to provide food to Isokelekel's party, leading to war; or leads the Saudeleur army to initially route the invasion; or was the lieutenant who threw the stone striking Isokelekel.

Legend recounts that the battle ended as Saudeleur lord Saudemwohl retreated ever uphill to a stream, where he transformed into a fish and remains today.

Petersen (1990) presents an alternative analysis of the Isokelekel myth under which the historical leader invaded not Pohnpei, but only the region Madolenihmw. This, in turn, fed into the politically decentralized oral legends behind Nan Madol.

== Reign ==
Isokelekel resided with his family at Nan Madol on Temwen Island, though his capital was Madolenihmw. He was variously described as seizing the reign of the Saudeleur, and as gaining the consensus of the elite in his installation as the first nahnmwarki. Isokelekel divided the Pohnpei into three autonomous chiefdoms based on preexisting divisions; this number later grew to five. He summoned the elite of Pohnpei and surrounding islands to gather, to whom he announced a welcome regime change, and with whom he consulted in creating a new decentralized Pohnpeian political system. Some mythological versions include divine inspiration by the god Luhk, who brought the three vanquished chiefs into a hovering canoe. Although the political system was greatly decentralized from Saudeleur times, many of the methods of paying tribute to higher classes went unchanged: the uhpa (service) and nohpwei (first fruits) payments of the Saudeleur era remained customary, and religious institutions such as nah continued to develop. Sokehs, a prestigious region of Pohnpei under Saudeleur reign, was largely stripped of its might.

At Pahn Akuwalap, Isokelekel instituted a new political order, the sacred nahnmwarki, lesser nahnken, and priestly title system that remains in modern use on Pohnpei. Overall, his reign is characterized in legend as gentle. His supreme titles included Wasa Lapalap at Madolenihmw, Sangoro at Uh, Pwoudo at Nett, and Iso Eni at Sokehs.

While the nahnken were also sacred, the nahnmwarki in particular was sacrosanct and subject to several taboos. Nahnmwarki were forbidden to appear in public, and communicated to commoners through the nahnken. This served to protect the sacrosanct nature of the ruler and to protect against abuse of authority. Nahnmwarki and nahnken families intermarried, and except for the son of Isokelekel, the ruling title passed matrilineally. Generally, men were encouraged to marry daughters of their paternal aunts (their first cousins).

During his reign, Isokelekel and his party married and assimilated as much as possible into Pohnpeian society, however, semi-divine Isokelekel remained above many strict taboos, taking his sister as a wife. At one point, he instructed one of his pregnant Pohnpeian wives to kill the infant if she bore a male. She gave birth in his absence, and instead of following his instructions, she hid her son Nahnlepenien with an elderly couple. Isokelekel met his son as an adult; Nahnlepenien was recognized as special because of his flagrant casualness with divine Isokelekel and breaking other strict taboos. Isokelekel decided to spare his son because he grew fond of him. From here, the origin of the nahnken also has a mythical basis: Nahnlepenien broke Pohnpeian customs and taboos, including the incest taboo with Isokelekel's eldest sister, a motherly figure in the culture. Isokelekel was loath to punish his son and spared him physical punishment. Instead, he created the title of nahnken, a lesser rank than nahnmwarki, for his son.

== Death ==
At Peikapw, a place of prayer, Isokelekel saw his reflection in a pool of water and, realizing his old age, decided to commit suicide. According to one legend, he tied his penis to the top of a young palm tree. Letting go of the bent tree, his penis was torn off, and Isokelekel bled to death.

The remains of Isokelekel are believed to be within a large mortuary on Temwen Island. However, some believe the tomb is but a decoy, and that the hero was buried at sea. Nonetheless, the tomb is a sacred site. In 1907, when German governor Berg insisted on excavating the crypt, he died of sunstroke, confirming among locals the power of its relics. The tomb was again excavated in 1928 by the Japanese, who found bones larger than those of modern Pohnpeians.

== Legacy ==
Today, Isokelekel is regarded as a cultural hero on both Kosrae and Pohnpei. He has left many chiefly claimants of descent on modern Pohnpei, including over 22 generations of reigning nahnmwarki descendants. Modern chiefs of Pohnpei trace their lineage to Isokelekel, though local nahnken chiefs have come to hold titles in dual bloodlines.

The association of Isokelekel with invincibility is such that a Kosraean uttering the name to a Pohnpeian amounts to an undisguised challenge. Petersen (1995) identifies a cultural theme of caution within the Isokelekel myth in relations with foreign powers, modernly applicable to the United States. Petersen (1990) also comments that "initiation of important events in Pohnpei mythology is often ascribed to outsiders," the prime example being Isokelekel and the Saudeleur.

The legend of Isokelekel is also used to explain the mixed racial makeup of Pohnpei against its Micronesian background. Isokelekel's party thoroughly settled the eastern, most populous areas of Pohnpei, from which their relations diffused.

== See also ==
- History of the Federated States of Micronesia
- Micronesian mythology
