= Asia (1818 ship) =

Merchant ship built in 1818

History

United Kingdom
- Name: Asia
- Owner: George McInnes
- Builder: A. Hall & Company, Aberdeen
- Cost: £7,149
- Yard number: 27
- Launched: 1818
- Fate: Last listed 1845
- Notes: Two decks and three masts

General characteristics
- Type: Brig
- Tons burthen: 532, or 536 (bm)
- Length: 118 ft 6 in (36.1 m)
- Beam: 32 ft 5 in (9.9 m)
- Depth: 15 ft 5 in (4.7 m)
- Propulsion: Sail

Asia was a merchant ship built by A. Hall & Company at Aberdeen in 1818. She made eight voyages between 1820 and 1836 transporting convicts from Britain to Australia. She made one voyage for the British East India Company (EIC) between 1826 and 1827. At the same time she served in private trade to India as a licensed ship. She also carried assisted emigrants to Australia. She was last listed in 1845.

== Career ==
In 1813 the EIC had lost its monopoly on the trade between India and Britain. British ships were then free to sail to India or the Indian Ocean under a license from the EIC. Asia first appeared in Lloyd's Register (LR) in 1820 with I. Morris, master, McInnis, owner, and trade London-Bombay. On 7 July 1819, Asia, Morrice, master, sailed from Deal on 7 July 1819, bound for Bombay, and arrived back at Gravesend on 23 June 1820.

1st convict voyage (1820): Captain Jason Morice left Sheerness, England on 3 September 1820 and arrived in Sydney on 28 December. Asia had embarked 190 male convicts; one convict died during the voyage.

2nd convict voyage (1822): Captain Thomas Ried departed England on 4 April 1822 and arrived in Sydney on 24 July. Asia had embarked 190 male convicts; one convict died during the voyage. Asia left Sydney on 8 September bound for Bombay.

3rd convict voyage (1824–1825): Asia, under the command of Thomas Stead, left Cork, Ireland on 29 October 1824 and arrived in Sydney on 22 February 1825. She had embarked 190 male convicts; no convicts died during the voyage. She left Sydney on 27 March bound for Calcutta. She left in company with Henry. As they progressed up the Outer Route to Torres Strait Henry struck Portlock Reef (10.117°S 142.359°E) on the northern tip of the Great Barrier reef and was wrecked. Asia rescued all aboard Henry and eventually sailed on to Calcutta.

EIC voyage (1826–1827): Captain Stead sailed from the Downs on 10 June 1826, bound for China and Quebec. Asia arrived at Whampoa anchorage on 7 November. She left on 10 January 1827, and reached St Helena on 22 March, and arrived at Quebec on 15 May. She arrived back at the Thames on 16 August.

4th convict voyage (1827–1828): Captain Stead left London, England on 23 November 1827 and arrived in Sydney on 13 March 1828. Asia had embarked 100 male convicts; no convicts died during the voyage. When she returned to England she carried 160 tons of whale oil that John Bull had gathered.

5th convict voyage (1829–1830): Captain Stead left Cork, Ireland on 10 September 1829, arrived in Sydney on 13 January 1830. Asia had embarked 200 female convicts; three convicts died during the voyage.

6th convict voyage (1831–1832): Captain Stead sailed from Portsmouth, England on 16 October 1831 and arrived in Sydney on 13 February 1832. Asia had embarked 200 male convicts; no convicts died during the voyage.

7th convict voyage (1833): Captain Stead left the Downs on 21 February 1833 and arrived in Sydney on 27 June 1833. Asia had embarked 230 male convicts; five convicts died during the voyage.

8th convict voyage (1835–1836): Captain Stead left Sheerness, England on 8 November 1835, arrived in Hobart Town on 21 February 1836. Asia had embarked 290 male convicts; two convicts died during the voyage.

Immigrant voyage (1839–1840): Asia, barque of 563 tons, Govey, master, sailed from Cromarty on 17 September 1838 and from Plymouth on 22 January 1839, bound for Australia with 267 government-assisted emigrants. Asia arrived at Sydney on 10 May.

== Later career and fate ==
Lloyd's Register for 1839 showed Asia with Govey, master, changing to Thomas, J.Somes, owner, and trade Plymouth–New South Wales, changing to London transport. She had undergone a large repair in 1835 and small repairs in 1838. She was last listed in LR in 1845 with D. Smith, master, and other information unchanged.
