= Henry (1819 ship) =

History

United Kingdom
- Name: Henry
- Builder: George Taylor, Quebec
- Launched: 1 July 1819
- Fate: Wrecked in the Torres Strait in 1825

General characteristics
- Tons burthen: 285, or 38076/94, or 385, or 386 (bm)
- Length: 107 ft (33 m)
- Beam: 29 ft (8.8 m)
- Propulsion: Sail

Henry was a sailing ship built in 1819 at Quebec, Canada. She initially sailed between London and Quebec, but then she made two voyages transporting convicts from England to Australia. She was wrecked in the Torres Strait in 1825.

== Career ==
Henry was re-registered in London on 2 June 1820.

She entered Lloyd's Register (LR), in 1820 with J. Turner, master, Osborne, owner, and trade London–Quebec. She was re-registered at London on 2 June 1820.

Year	Master	Owner	Trade	Source
1823	J.Turner; Thatcher	Osborne; Granger	London–Quebec; London–New South Wales	LR; 286 tons (bm)
1824	Thatcher	Granger & Co	London–New South Wales	LR; 386 tons (bm)

=== First convict voyage (1823) ===
Under the command of Thomas Thatcher and surgeon Thomas Davies, she left London, England on 10 June 1823, arrived at Sydney on 26 August. She had embarked 160 male convicts; no convicts died on the voyage. Henry sailed from Port Jackson on 27 September, bound for Batavia.

=== Second convict voyage (1824–1825) ===
Henry left London, England under the command of James Ferrier and surgeon William Carlyle on 12 October 1824, arrived at Hobart Town on 9 February 1825. She had embarked 79 female convicts and passengers and landed 77 convicts at Hobart. No convicts died on the voyage. She left Hobart Town on 20 February, with 2 female convicts and passengers, arriving at Sydney on 27 February. She left Port Jackson 27 March 1825 with cargo and passengers for Batavia and Singapore, in company with Asia.

== Fate ==
While on the voyage to Batavia, Henry was wrecked in the Torres Strait on 15 April with no loss of life. As she was proceeding in company with Asia via the Outer Route to Torres Strait, Henry struck Portlock Reef (10.117°S 142.359°E) on the northern tip of the Great Barrier reef and was wrecked. Asia rescued all aboard Henry and eventually sailed on to Calcutta.
