= John Bull (1815 ship) =

History

United Kingdom
- Name: John Bull
- Builder: James Scott & Co., Fort Gloster, Calcutta.
- Launched: 1815
- Fate: Disappeared after November 1830

General characteristics
- Tons burthen: 176, or 180 (bm)

John Bull was built in 1815 at Fort Gloster, Calcutta. She carried convicts from India to Mauritius and Sydney, and traded between India and Mauritius and New South Wales. She was sold in New South Wales in 1824. Until mid-1827 she traded first with Tasmania, and then with Canton. In June 1827 she became a whaler and made two complete voyages. She disappeared without a trace after November 1830 while on her third whaling voyage.

== Career ==
In 1817 John Bull carried five Indian convicts from Bengal to Mauritius, and in 1822 she carried some British convicts from Bengal to Port Jackson. In 1824 Captain Benjamin Osman, her owner and master, offered her for sale in Sydney. He died on 1 March after a long and painful illness.

In 1824 John Bull was sold in New South Wales, to Messrs. James Reibey and Thomas Wills for some £2000. They intended to sail her between Sydney and Port Dalrymple. Later she traded with Mauritius and Canton. She brought tea, and satin, from Canton. On occasion she sailed via Manila, where she acquired sugar.

On 10 September 1825 Captain Henry Row passed within 40 miles from some islands at 6°47′N 158°1′E as he was sailing from New South Wales to Canton. He did not approach more closely as he sighted five boats that gave chase. John Bull was lightly armed and so Row was unwilling to interact with them, choosing instead to sail on. He believed the islands were unknown and so named them "John Bull's Islands".

In June 1827 John Bull was at Sydney undergoing fitting as a whaler. On 23 August she sailed for the "Sperm fishery". John Bull, Captain Lewis, arrived back at Sydney on 20 May 1828 with 145 tons of sperm oil. The cargo was sold to the London market at £74 per ton (Imperial measure), yielding a profit of £3-4000 pounds. Customs declarations gave her cargo as 179 tons of sperm oil.

John Bull, Salmon, master, of 176 tons (bm), sailed for the sperm fishery again on 19 October. On 5 or 6 February 1829 John Bull had 300 barrels of oil. A later report stated that she had been seen off Japan; she had poor results, and her chief mate had died in a fall from her yards. She returned to port on 11 February 1830 with 162 tons (or 1300 barrels or 550 casks) of oil; she had caught just 52 "fish". Her cargo was consigned to her owners, Messrs. Jones and Walker. Asia, Stead, master, carried the whale oil that John Bull had gathered back to England for the London market.

In March Lamb & Co, and other investors, purchased John Bull for £2150. On 13 May Captain W. Barkus sailed for the sperm fishery with 160 tuns, casks, and fishery stores.

== Fate ==
John Bull was sighted off "Melanti" in November 1830. There was no further trace, presumed foundered with the loss of all hands.
