= Saudeleur dynasty =

First organized government uniting the people of Pohnpei island

Coordinates: 6°51′N 158°13′E

- c. 1100–1200–c. 1628
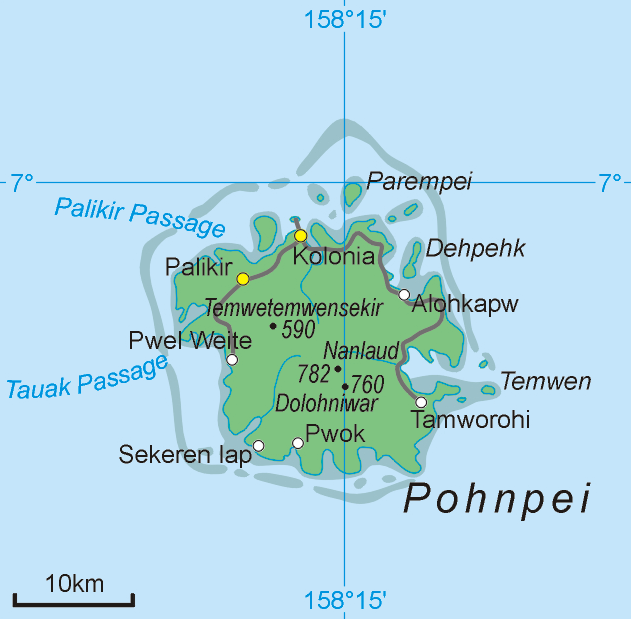
- Map of Pohnpei island
- Capital: Nan Madol
- Common languages: Pohnpeian
- Religion: Pohnpeian, Saudeleur
- Government: Absolute monarchy
- Saudeleur
  - c. 1100–1200: Olosohpa
  - ?: Mwohn Mwehi (Note: According to Ballinger (1978), Mwohn Mwehi was the second Saudeleur, and Saudemwohl was the last, but many names are unknown, as is the order of identified rulers.)
  - ?: Inenen Mwehi
  - ?: Ketiparelong
  - ?: Raipwenlake
  - ?: Raipwenlang
  - ?: Sakon Mwehi
  - ?: Saraiden Sapw
  - c. 1628: Saudemwohl
- History
  - Arrival of Olisihpa and Olosohpa: c. 1100–1200
  - Conquest by Isokelekel: c. 1628

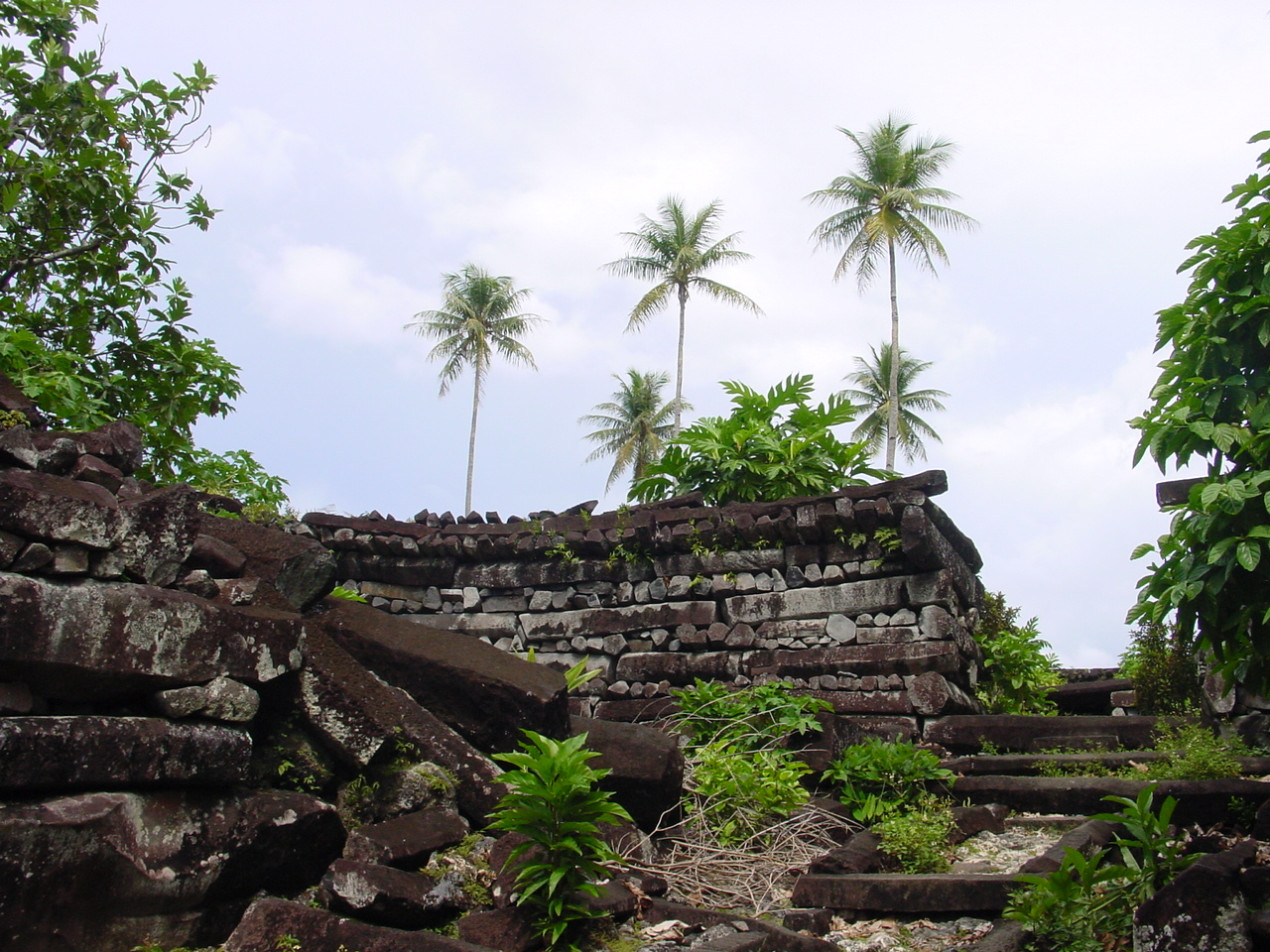
Nan Madol, capital of the Saudeleur dynasty

The Saudeleur dynasty (Pohnpeian: Mwehin Sau Deleur, "Period of the Lord of Deleur"; also spelled Chau-te-leur) was the first organized government uniting the people of Pohnpei island, ruling from c. 1100–1200 CE to c. 1628 CE. (Note: The Saudeleur era lasted around 500 years. Legend generally dates their downfall to the 1500s, however archaeologists date Saudeleur ruins to ca. 1628.) The era was preceded by the Mwehin Kawa (Period of Building) or Mwehin Aramas (Period of Peopling), and followed by Mwehin Nahnmwarki. The name Deleur was an ancient name for Pohnpei, today a state containing the capital of the Federated States of Micronesia.

Pohnpeian legend recounts that the Saudeleur rulers were of foreign origin, and that their appearance was quite different from native Pohnpeians. The Saudeleur centralized form of absolute rule is characterized in Pohnpeian legend as becoming increasingly oppressive over several generations. Arbitrary and onerous demands, as well as a reputation for offending Pohnpeian deities, sowed resentment among Pohnpeians. The Saudeleur dynasty ended with the invasion of Isokelekel, another semi-mythical foreigner, who replaced the Saudeleur rule with the more decentralized nahnmwarki system in existence today.

== Origins ==
The earliest settlers on the island were probably Lapita culture people from the Southeast Solomon Islands or the Vanuatu archipelago.

The Saudeleur dynasty began with the arrival of twin sorcerers Olisihpa and Olosohpa from the mythical Western Katau, or Kanamwayso. Olisihpa and Olosohpa were said to be much taller than native Pohnpeians. The brothers arrived in a large canoe seeking a place to build an altar so that they could worship Nahnisohn Sahpw, the god of agriculture. After several false starts, the two brothers successfully built an altar at megalithic Nan Madol, where they performed their rituals. In legend, these brothers levitated the huge stones with the aid of a flying dragon. When Olisihpa died of old age, Olosohpa became the first Saudeleur. Olosohpa married a local woman and sired twelve generations, producing sixteen other Saudeleur rulers of the Dipwilap ("Great") clan. (Note: Hanlon (1988) notes differing accounts of the number of Saudeleur rulers, ranging from eight to seventeen, concluding that it is impossible to know this number for certain.) The founders of the dynasty ruled kindly, though their successors placed ever increasing demands on their subjects.

== Society ==
Rule was maintained by one man, the Saudeleur, at Nan Madol. The land, its contents, and its inhabitants were owned by the Saudeleur ruler, who leased the land to landlord classes overseeing commoners harvesting the land. The commoners were required to present the ruler with frequent tributes of fruit and fish.

Tribute consisted mostly of breadfruit during rak, the season of plenty, while it shifted to yams, taro, and fermented breadfruit during isol, the season of scarcity. Seafood was also presented to the Saudeleur at designated times. The tribute system was initially seasonal; however, over time, the demands of the Saudeleur left the populace starving and living as slaves, as they had to pay in labor and offer most materials first to the ruler. Public dissatisfaction led to at least two assassinations, but another Saudeleur simply rose in place of the last. Some common methods of recourse against oppression were defiance of orders and theft of property offered to the Saudeleur.

A few Saudeleur were benign rulers: Inenen Mwehi established an aristocracy, and Raipwenlang was a skilled magician. Others, however, were renowned for their cruelty. Sakon Mwehi taxed Pohnpeians ruthlessly, and according to legend, the Saudeleur known as Raipwenlake, purportedly used magic to locate the fattest Pohnpeians and eat them. Another, Ketiparelong, is remembered for his gluttonous wife who was fed her own father's liver by suffering commoners at a banquet; she committed suicide, followed by Ketiparelong. Saraiden Sapw established the customary First Fruits practice on Pohnpei.

=== Administrative divisions ===
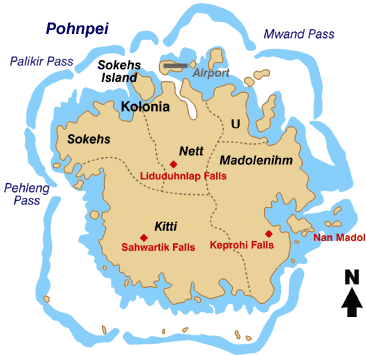
Municipality map of modern Pohnpei; under Saudeleur rule, there were only three first-level divisions

Pohnpei was divided into three wei, or states, during the reign of the Saudeleur Mwohnmwei. Malenkopwale (Madolenihmw) was the eastern division, subdivided into seven areas: Wenik Peidi, Wenik Peidak, Enimwahn, Lehdau, Senipehn, Lepinsed, and Deleur. In the west, Kohpwahleng (Kitti) comprised four areas: Onohnleng, Kepihleng, Lehnpwel, and Ant Atoll. Pwahpwahlik (Sokehs) in the north was made of Palikir, Sokehs, Tipwen Dongalap, Kahmar, Nan Mair, and Pakin Island. The centralized system incorporated preexisting lower level divisions, and adopted the native chiefly structure. Later, U and Nett became states in the north, making up the present-day five municipalities of Pohnpei.

Sokehs was a prestigious region under Saudeleur reign, and Onohnleng remained largely autonomous. Areas of Kitti and Kepihleng in the west had a reputation for defying the authority of the eastern Saudeleur.

At the capital Nan Madol, the Saudeleur rulers developed a stratified title system denoting particular occupations, including chief adviser, food preparer, entrance guards, and dwelling guards.

According to legend, the rulers of the Saudeleur Dynasty were never concerned with military affairs, and the era is generally characterized as peaceful, though native Pohnpeians suffered and grew dissatisfied with the administration.

=== Religion ===
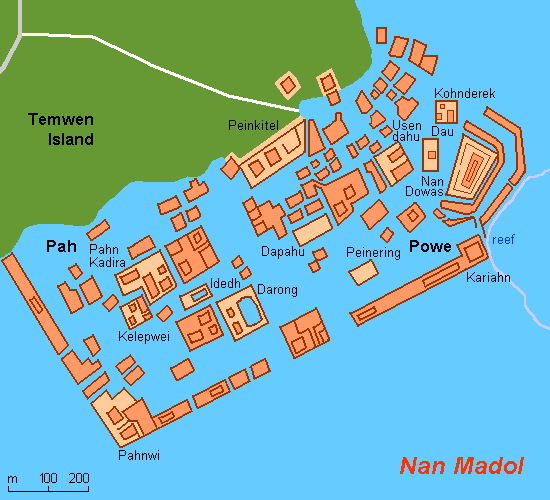
Nan Madol complex

Religion during the Saudeleur dynasty featured megalithic temples and funerary sites, food offerings, and oracular divinations. The central cult of the Saudeleur Dynasty was at Nan Madol, where offerings were made to the Thunder God Nahn Sapwe, or Daukatau, from whom the Saudeleur derived legitimacy. Nahn Sapwe was venerated natively by Pohnpeians. From Nan Madol, the cult of Nahn Sapwe spread to the other districts of Pohnpei. Other native cults included those surrounding freshwater eels and the deity Ilake.

The Saudeleur made an unsuccessful attempt to introduce worship of their own deity, Nahnisohn Sapw, to whom Pohnpeians offered only token homage. The Saudeleur rulers made the ravenous moray eel Nahn Samwohl an intermediary to Nahnisohn Sapw, who indicated the foreign god was contented by devouring tribute in the form of a turtle. The priestly class, headed by the Soukiseleng high priest, was powerful and influential in Pohnpeian society.

The annual kampa ritual affirmed Pohnpeians' dedication to the gods and spirits of the land. The sakau ceremony was an elaborate affirmation of Saudeleur dominance, with much ritual surrounding the preparation and presentation of gifts to rulers.

Food offerings reserved especially for the Saudeleur included turtles and dogs, both of which held ritual symbolism. Turtles (wei) represented the three major political divisions (wei) and held a central place in a myth where two brothers must sacrifice their mother – the Life-Giving Turtle – to be eaten by the Saudeleur after they jokingly said they would sell her for a taste of the Saudeleur's dog meat. The dog held a further important position in Saudeleur society: the rules of the Saudeleur were enforced by mythical dogs called Ounmatakai ("watchmen of the land"). At Nan Madol, remnants of turtle and dog status foods have been found.

== History ==
The Saudeleur dynasty is thought to have emerged in the 12th century, though exact dates remain uncertain due to the lack of written records. According to Pohnpeian oral tradition, the first Saudeleur ruler, a king named Saudeleur, arrived from the Southeast (possibly from the Mariana Islands or other Pacific regions) and established control over the island.

Under the rule of the Saudeleur dynasty, Pohnpei became a major center of power in the Micronesian region. The Saudeleurs centralized authority, controlling the island's resources, trade and political structure.

Over the centuries, the centralized power of the Saudeleur dynasty began to breed resentment among local chiefs. The strict control over resources, the forced labor for monumental construction and the divine status claimed by the Saudeleur kings led to growing discontent until its downfall in the 17th century.

=== Downfall ===
The Saudeleur polity was conquered by Isokelekel, who invaded Pohnpei from Kosrae, or the mythical East Katau. There is great variation among sources for the exact events before and during the invasion on Pohnpei; at least 13 differing accounts of the war are published. In most versions of the legend, the Saudeleur rule had become oppressive under its abusive centralized social system, and its lords had offended the Thunder God Nahn Sapwe, sealing the fate of the dynasty.

The Thunder God Nahn Sapwe had committed adultery with the wife of the Saudeleur lord. In anger, the Saudeleur lord set out to capture Nahn Sapwe. The ruler also used the affair as a pretext to suppress the worship of Nahn Sapwe. Some versions include that the ruler had also incensed other gods of the Pohnpeian pantheon and divested the high priest of Saum who prophesied the Saudeleur downfall. These offenses, as well as the oppressive land ownership and tribute system, drew the ire of gods, humans, and animals alike. Nahn Sapwe, offended by the Saudeleur lord, left Pohnpei for Kosrae (Katau). Having fled, he impregnated a barren human of his own Dipwenpahnmei (Under-the-breadfruit-tree) clan by feeding her a lime. This incestuous union produced the semi-divine Isokelekel, who in the womb knew his destiny of vengeance. As an adult, Isokelekel set sail with 333 men, women, and children with the secret intention of conquering Pohnpei. The embarkment consecrated by human sacrifice, a ritual widespread in Polynesian culture, but altogether rare in Pohnpeian history. On his way to Nan Madol, Isokelekel received breadfruit kernels from the chief of Ant Atoll. In their culture, breadfruit kernels were the meal of warriors about to battle, and the offering constituted an invitation to do battle with the Saudeleur. While on Ant, Isokelekel entered a romantic relationship with a native woman, demonstrating his intention to cultivate close ties with Pohnpeians and oppose only the Saudeleur.

According to many versions, war broke out at Nan Madol after playing between local children and those from Isokelekel's canoe escalated into a fight. In another version, Isokelekel had his lieutenant provoke a local warrior at a prearranged encounter. Other accounts hold that Isokelekel staged an insurrection after winning the trust of his hosts, and with help from the oppressed locals. Another version says that upon seeing the fortifications at Nan Madol, Isokelekel decided to withdraw, but was aided by a scorned and outcast woman from the ruling family. In other versions, Isokelekel's warriors are aided by hidden weapons that suddenly appeared.

The tide of war reversed several times, but ended against the Saudeleur, who retreated with his army into the main island of Pohnpei. Legend recounts that the battle ended as Saudeleur lord Saudemwohl retreated ever uphill to a stream, where he transformed into a fish and remains today. Isokelekel took the title of Nahnmwarki and assumed the seat of power in Nan Madol as had the Saudeleur Dynasty before him.

== Legacy ==
The Saudeleur tribute system was reduced, but persisted as a matter of custom in later eras. The modern tradition of tribute and feasting at funerals and celebrations is derived from Saudeleur-era tributary practices.

== See also ==
- History of the Federated States of Micronesia
