= Nan Madol =

Ruined ancient city in the Federated States of Micronesia

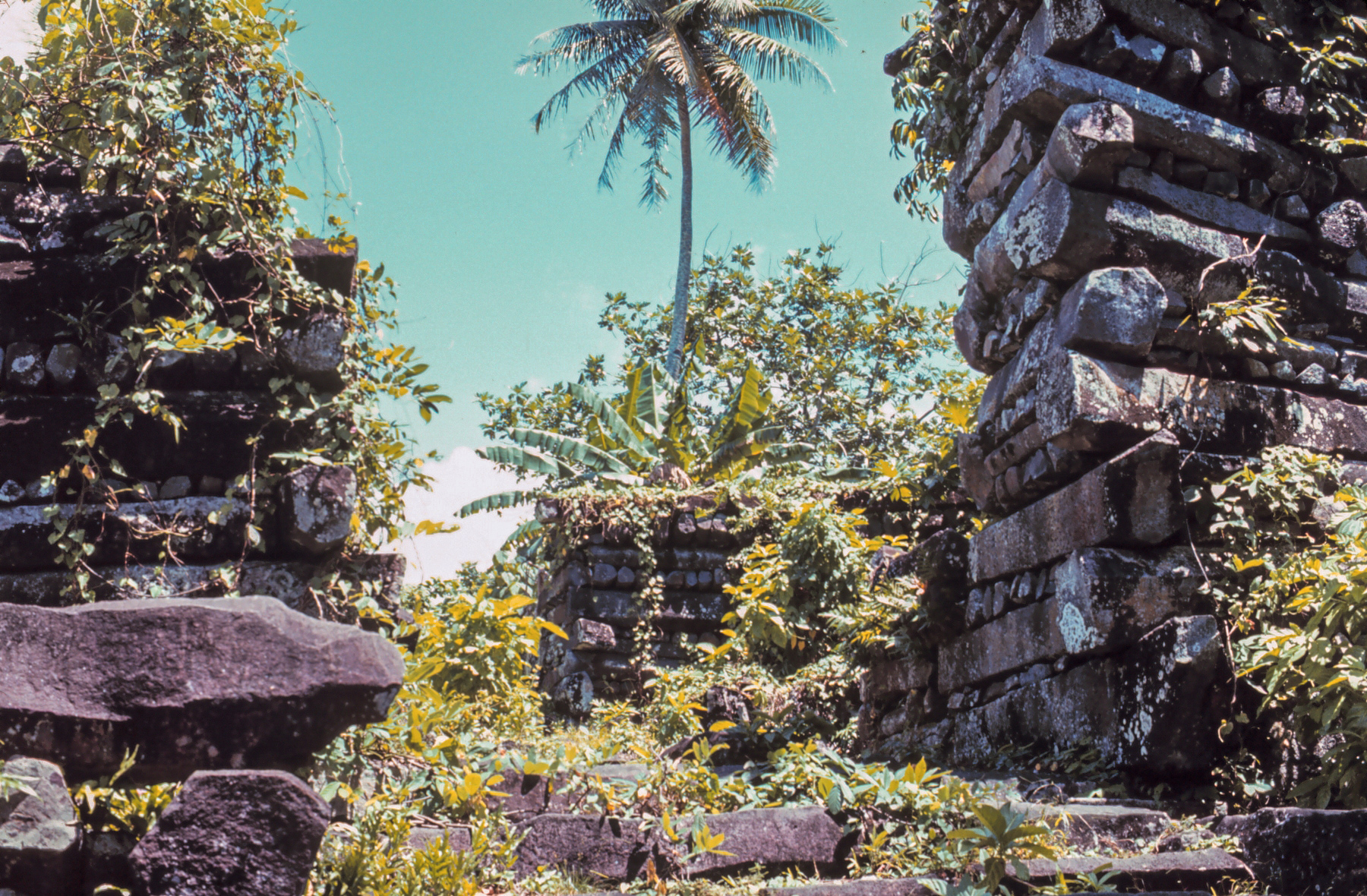
- Nan Madol

- Location within Federated States of Micronesia Location within Pacific Ocean
- 6°50′31″N 158°19′56″E
- Location: Temwen Island, Federated States of Micronesia

UNESCO World Heritage Site
- Official name: Nan Madol: Ceremonial Centre of Eastern Micronesia
- Type: Cultural
- Criteria: i, iii, iv, vi
- Designated: 2016 (40th session)
- Reference no.: 1503
- Region: Asia and the Pacific

U.S. National Register of Historic Places
- Designated: 19 December 1974
- Reference no.: 74002226

U.S. National Historic Landmark District
- Designated: 16 September 1985

Nan Madol complex map.

Nan Madol is an archaeological site adjacent to the eastern shore of the island of Pohnpei, now part of the Madolenihmw district of Pohnpei state in the Federated States of Micronesia in the western Pacific Ocean. Nan Madol was the capital of the Saudeleur dynasty until about 1628. (Note: The Saudeleur era lasted around 500 years. Legend generally dates their downfall to the 1500s, however archaeologists date Saudeleur ruins to ca. 1628.) The city, constructed in a lagoon, consists of a series of small artificial islands linked by a network of canals. The site core with its stone walls encloses an area approximately 1.5 by 0.5 kilometres (0.93 mi × 0.31 mi) and it contains 92 artificial islets—stone and coral fill platforms—bordered by tidal canals.

The name Nan Madol means "within the intervals" and is a reference to the canals that crisscross the ruins. The original name was Soun Nan-leng, "Reef of Heaven", according to Gene Ashby in his book Pohnpei, An Island Argosy. It is often called the "Eighth Wonder of the World", or the "Venice of the Pacific".

== History ==
Nan Madol was the ceremonial and political seat of the Saudeleur dynasty, which united Pohnpei's estimated population of 25,000 people until about 1628. Set apart between the main island of Pohnpei and Temwen Island, it was a scene of human activity as early as the first or second century AD. By the 8th or 9th century, islet construction had started, with construction of the distinctive megalithic architecture beginning 1180–1200 AD.

This structure is built over a tropical saltwater coral reef with ample fish and mollusks.

Polish ethnographer and oceanographer John Stanislaw Kubary made the first detailed description of Nan Madol in 1874.

Little can be verified about the megalithic construction. Pohnpeian tradition claims that the builders of the Leluh archaeological site on Kosrae (likewise composed of huge stone buildings) migrated to Pohnpei, where they used their skills and experience to build the even more impressive Nan Madol complex. Radiocarbon dating indicates that Nan Madol predates Leluh; thus, it is more likely that Nan Madol influenced Leluh.

According to Pohnpeian legend, Nan Madol was constructed by twin sorcerers Olisihpa and Olosohpa from the mythical Western Katau, or Kanamwayso. The brothers arrived in a large canoe seeking a place to build an altar so that they could worship Nahnisohn Sahpw, the god of agriculture. After several false starts, the two brothers successfully built an altar off Temwen Island, where they performed their rituals. In legend, these brothers levitated the huge stones with the aid of a flying dragon. When Olisihpa died of old age, Olosohpa became the first Saudeleur. Olosohpa married a local woman and sired twelve generations, producing sixteen other Saudeleur rulers of the Dipwilap ("Great") clan. (Note: Hanlon (1988) notes differing accounts of the number of Saudeleur rulers, ranging from eight to seventeen, concluding that it is impossible to know this number for certain.)

The founders of the dynasty ruled kindly, though their successors placed ever increasing demands on their subjects. Their reign ended with the invasion by Isokelekel, who also resided at Nan Madol, though his successors abandoned the site.

== Purpose and features ==
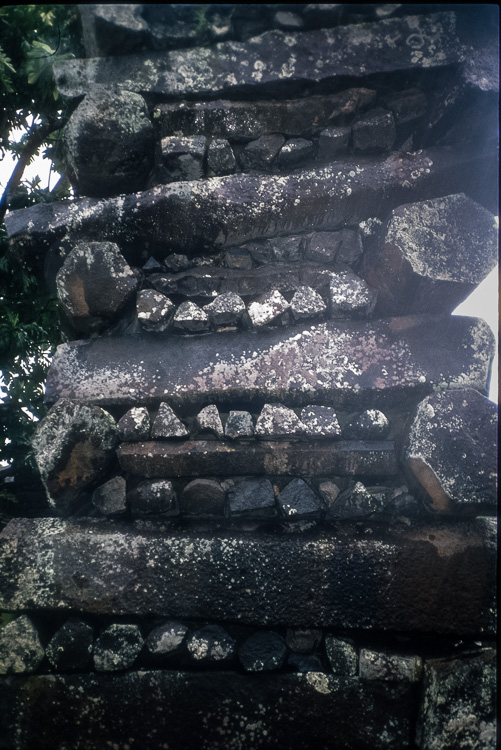
Detail of columnar basalt pieces

The elite centre was a special place of residence for the nobility and of mortuary activities presided over by priests. Its population almost certainly did not exceed 1,000, and may have been less than half that. Although a number of the residents were chiefs, the majority were commoners. Nan Madol served, in part, as a way for the ruling Saudeleur chiefs to organize and control potential rivals by requiring them to live in the city rather than in their home districts, where their activities were difficult to monitor.

Madol Powe, the mortuary sector, contains 58 islets in the northeastern area of Nan Madol. Most islets were once occupied by the dwellings of priests. Some islets served a special purpose: food preparation, canoe construction on Dapahu, and coconut oil preparation on Peinering. High walls surrounding tombs are located on Peinkitel, Karian, and Lemenkou, but the most prominent is the royal mortuary islet of Nandauwas, where walls 5.5–7.5 metres (18–25 ft) high surround a central tomb enclosure within the main courtyard. This was built for the first Saudeleur.

On Nan Madol, there is no fresh water or food; water must be collected and food grown inland. During Saudeleur rule, Pohnpeians brought essential food and water by boat. The Saudeleur received food at a particular islet: first Peiniot, and later the closer Usennamw.

Around 1628, when Isokelekel overthrew the Saudeleurs and began the Nahnmwarki Era, the Nahnmwarkis lived at Nan Madol, but had to gather their own water and grow their own food. This is thought to have caused them eventually to abandon Nan Madol and move back to their own districts, although there are other explanations for the desertion of the complex, such as a sharp population decline.

== Archaeology ==
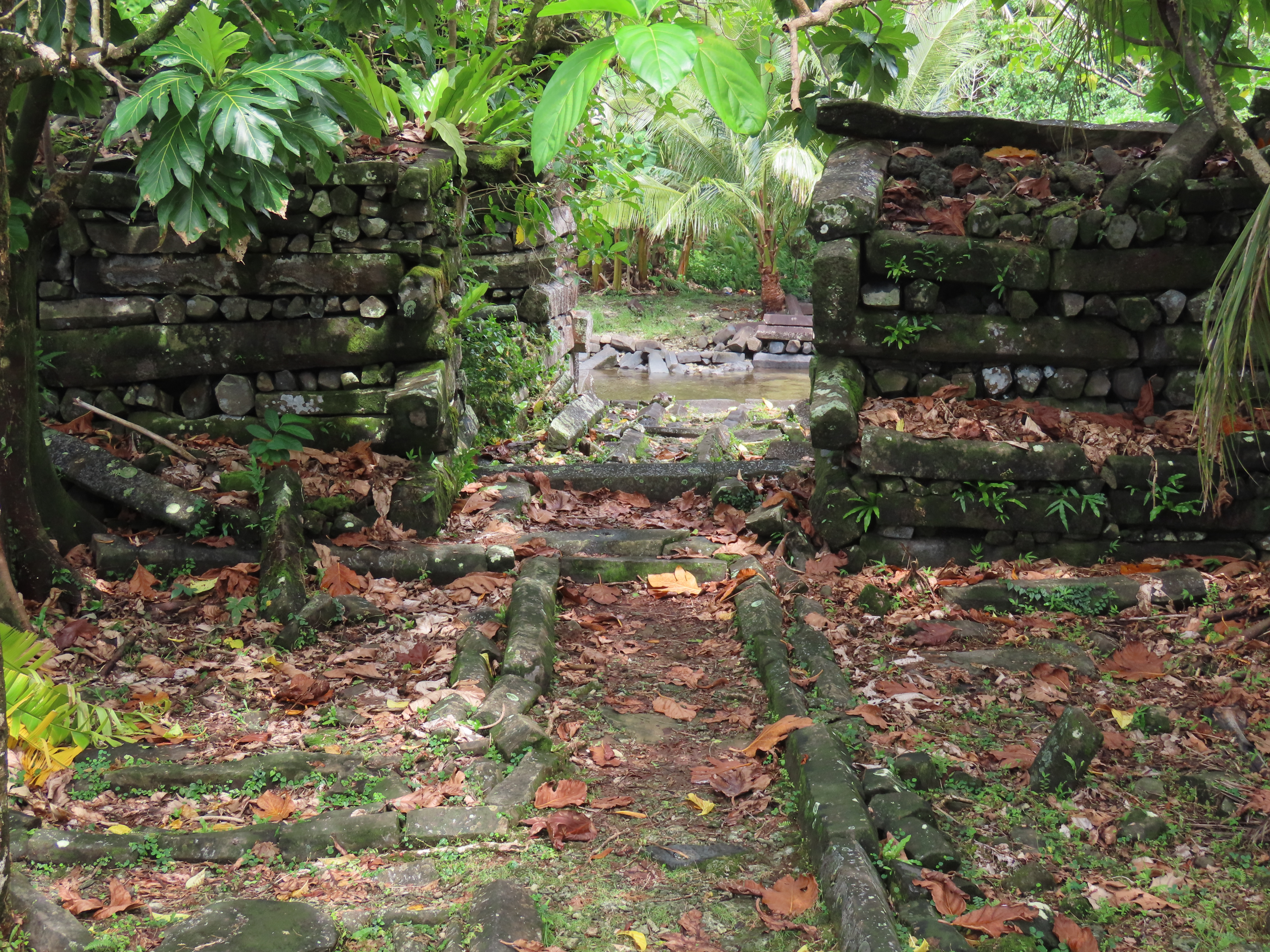
Example of Nan Madol's architecture

Today Nan Madol forms an archaeological district covering more than 18 square kilometres (6.9 sq mi) and includes the stone architecture built up on a coral reef flat along the shore of Temwen Island, several other artificial islets, and the adjacent Pohnpei main island coastline. The site core with its stone walls encloses an area approximately 1.5 by 0.5 kilometres (0.93 mi × 0.31 mi) containing 92 artificial islets—stone and coral fill platforms—bordered by tidal canals.

Carbon dating indicates that megalithic construction at Nan Madol began around AD 1180 when large basalt stones were taken from a volcanic plug on the opposite side of Pohnpei. The earliest settlement on Pohnpei was probably around AD 1 although radiocarbon dating shows human activity starting around AD 80–200.

In 1985, the ruins of Nan Madol were declared a National Historical Landmark.

Until its closure in 2012, objects from the site were displayed at Lidorkini Museum.

=== Offshore underwater archaeological surveys at Nan Madol ===
In 1978 and 1979, Arthur Saxe conducted underwater archaeological surveys to investigate reports of submerged basalt columns just offshore of Nan Madol and to search for two legendary submerged prehistoric cities known as Kahnihmw Namkhet and Kahnihmweiso. These surveys reported finding several tall stone pillars covered in coral growth and as tall as 6 metres (20 ft) tall, 0.9–1.2 metres (3.0–3.9 ft) wide, at depths of over 25 metres (82 ft). Neither Kahnihmw Namkhet nor Kahnihmweiso was found. However, it was hypothesized that the city of Kahnihmweiso might have been built over a cavern, which collapsed and formed a blue hole that swallowed the city.

In 1988 and 1989, a team of archaeologists from the University of Oregon conducted underwater archaeological surveys around Nan Madol. They found a number of prone basalt columns on the sea floor seaward of Nan Madol. They concluded that these columns consisted of lost, discarded or fallen building materials. They also examined underwater pillars reported by Saxe. They located two randomly spaced clusters of columns. They drove a steel rod into two of them and found only coral. One of them was raised and carefully dissected. This column was found to consist entirely of coral and clearly is not a "purposely positioned stone column".

In 2013, Ishimura and others used multi-beam sonar, ROVs, and scuba diving to examine submerged block-shaped features and columnar objects and the blue hole. They found neither evidence of anthropogenic pillars composed of basalt columns nor any evidence that the underwater columns are man-made structures. They also concluded that the blue hole is a sinkhole that developed in reef limestones during sea level lowstands of glacial maximums.

== In popular culture and lost continent theories ==
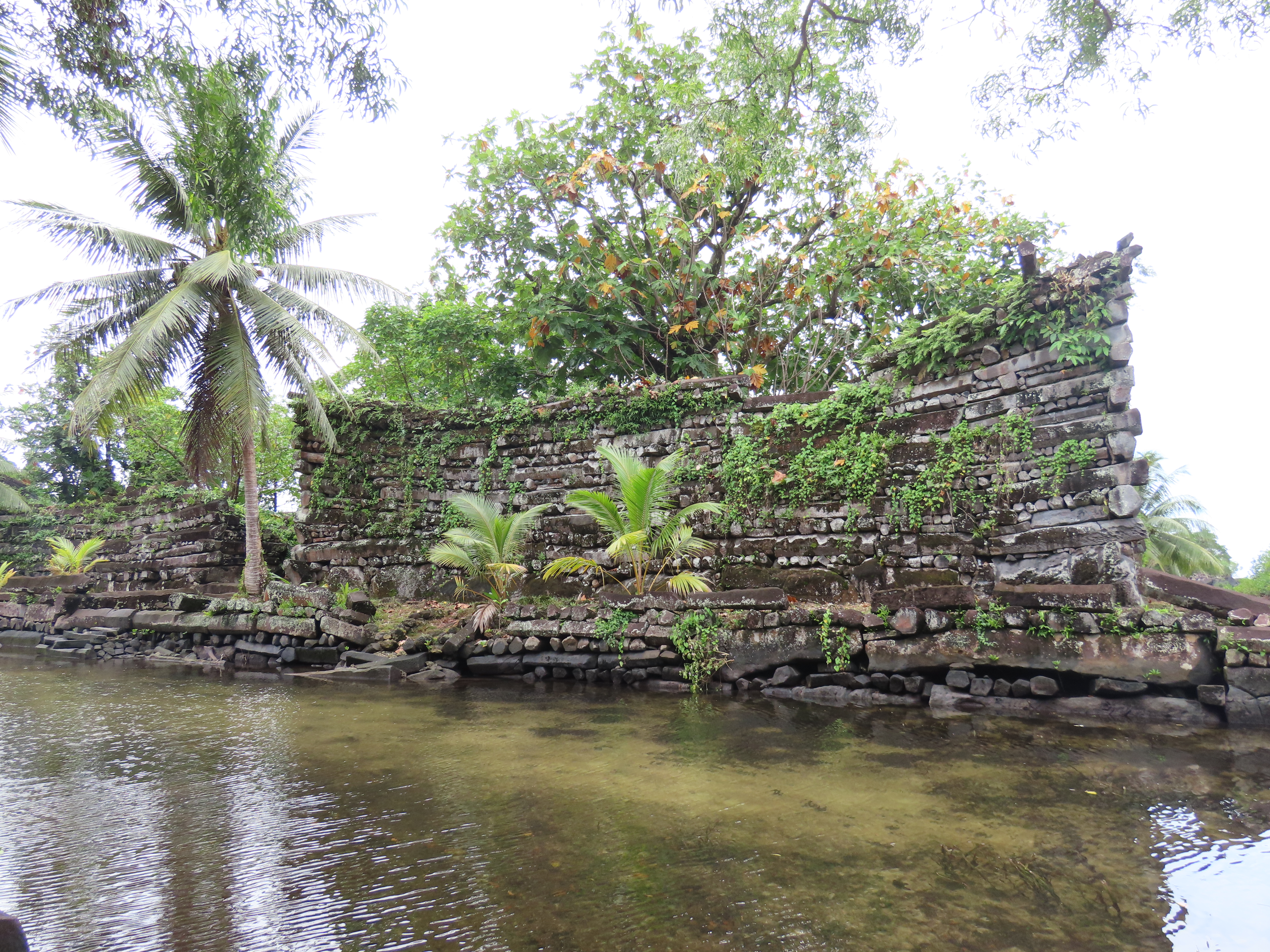
The ruins of Nan Madol and surroundings

The ruins of Nan Madol were used as the setting for a lost race story by A. Merritt, The Moon Pool (1918), in which the islands are called Nan-Tauach and the ruins are called the Nan-Matal.

Nan Madol has been interpreted by some as the remains of one of the "lost continents" of Lemuria or Mu. Nan Madol was one of the sites James Churchward identified as being part of the lost continent of Mu, starting in his 1926 book The Lost Continent of Mu Motherland of Man. There is no scientific basis for the claims of Churchward, whose writings on Mu are considered to be pseudoscience.

Nan Madol was featured in episode two of the pseudoarchaeological work Ancient Apocalypse by Graham Hancock which aired on Netflix, in which false claims were made about the age of the site. Experts in Pacific geography and archaeology have characterised Hancock's claims about Nan Madol as "incredibly insulting to the ancestors of the Pohnpeian [islanders] that did create these structures", linking them to 19th-century "racist" and "white supremacist" ideologies.

== Gallery ==
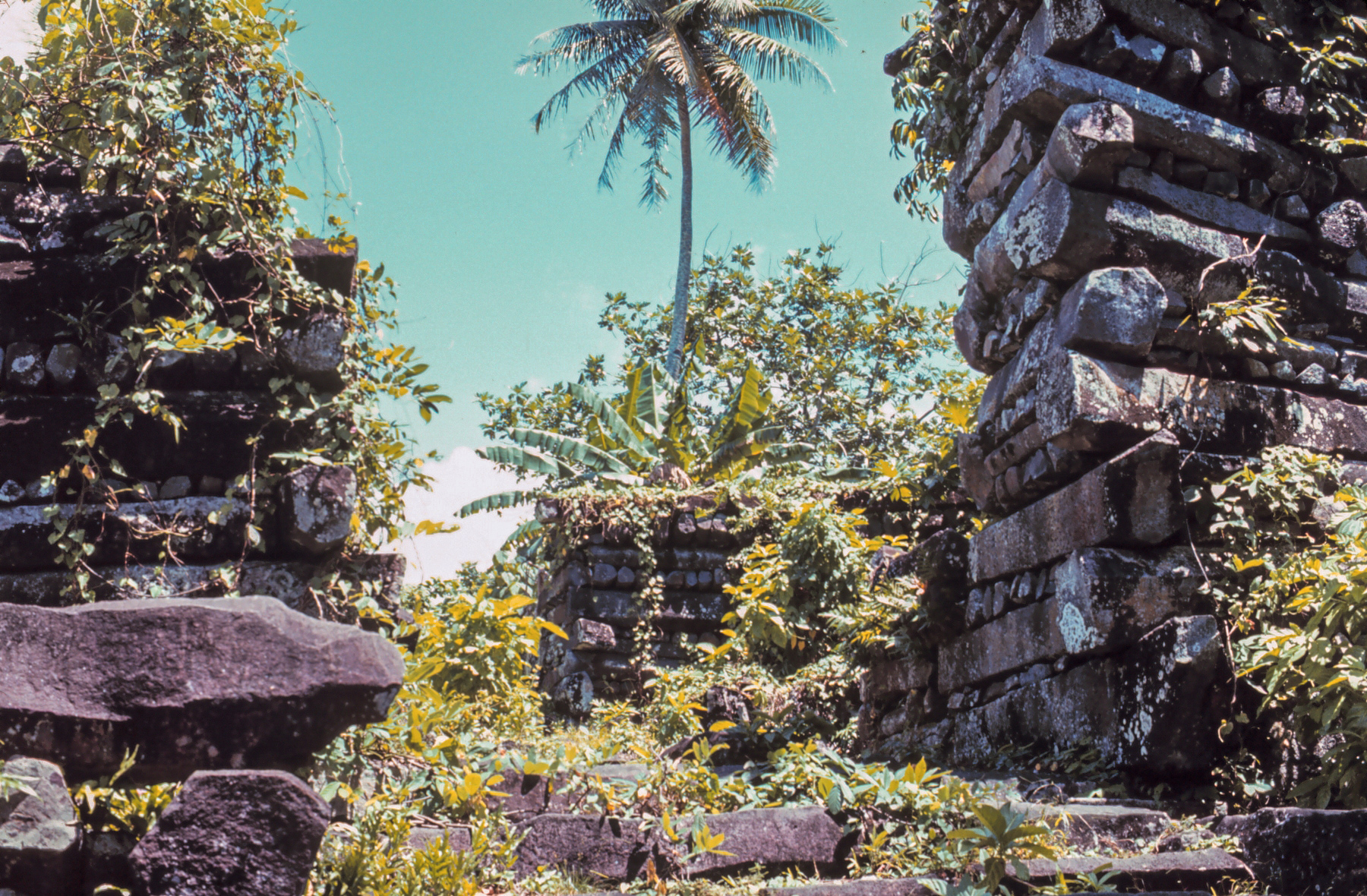

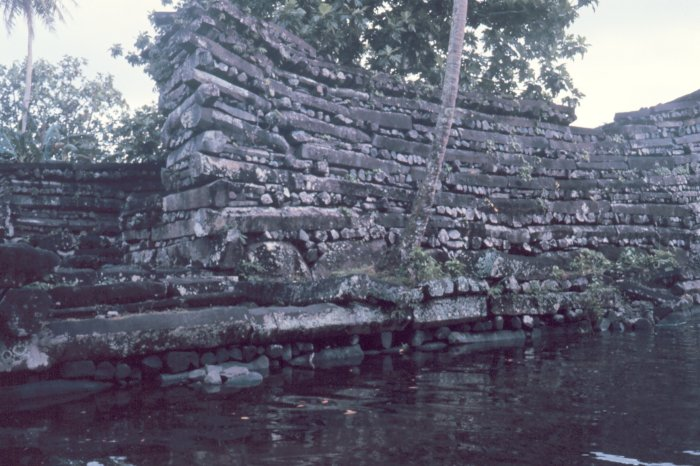

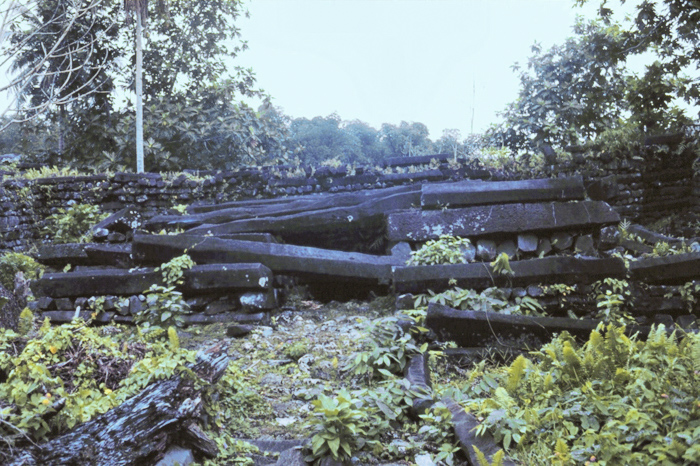

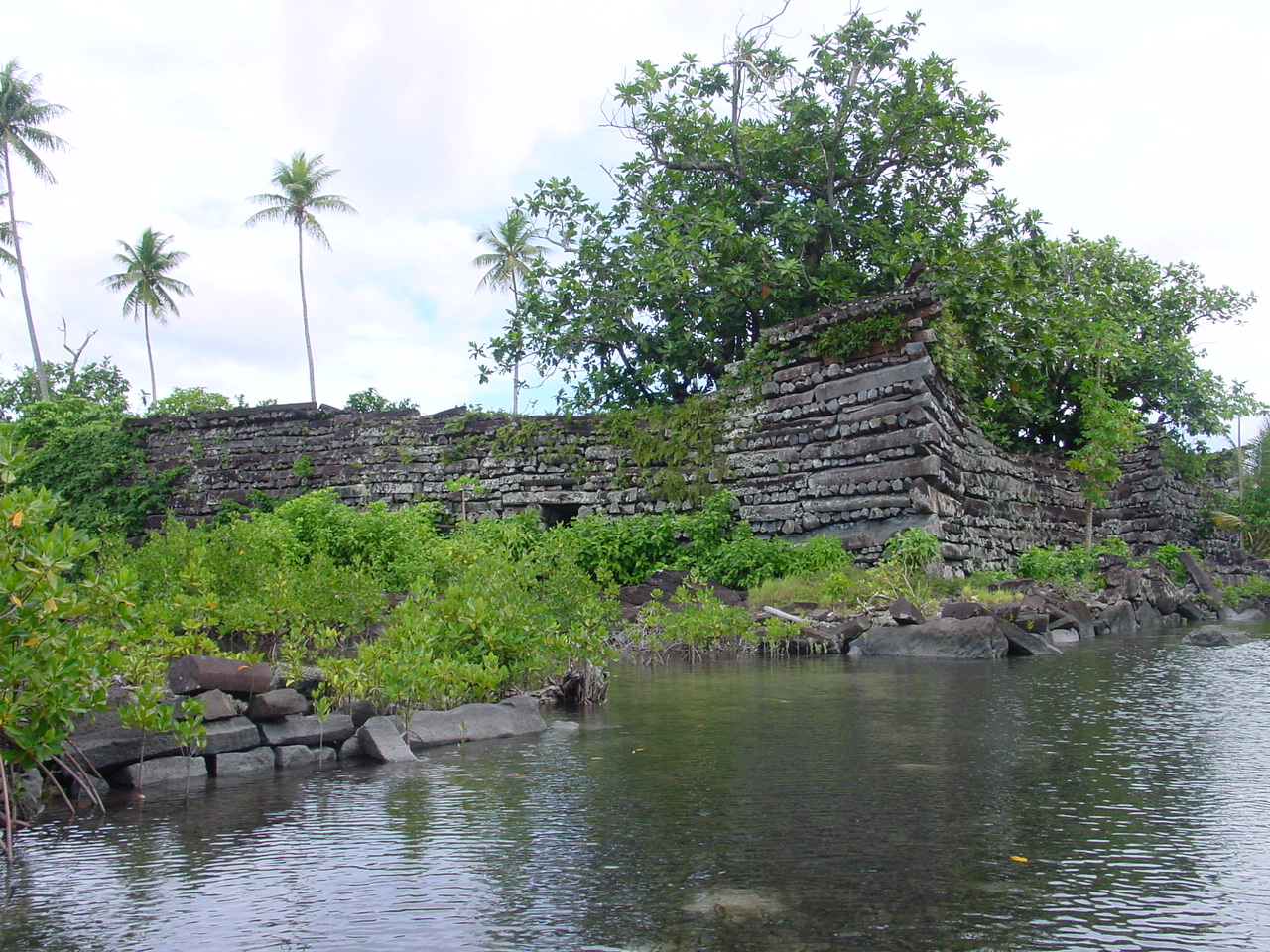

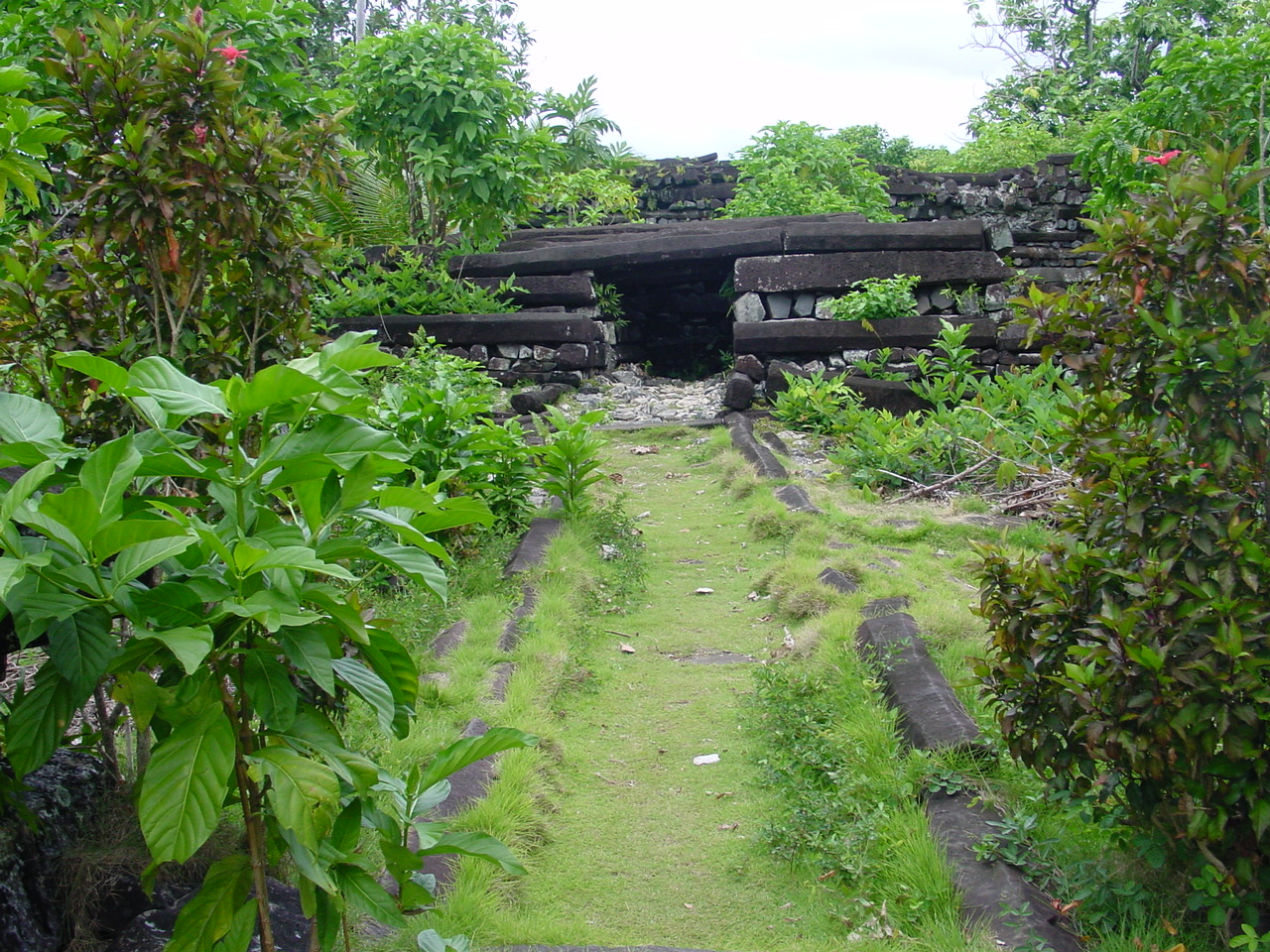

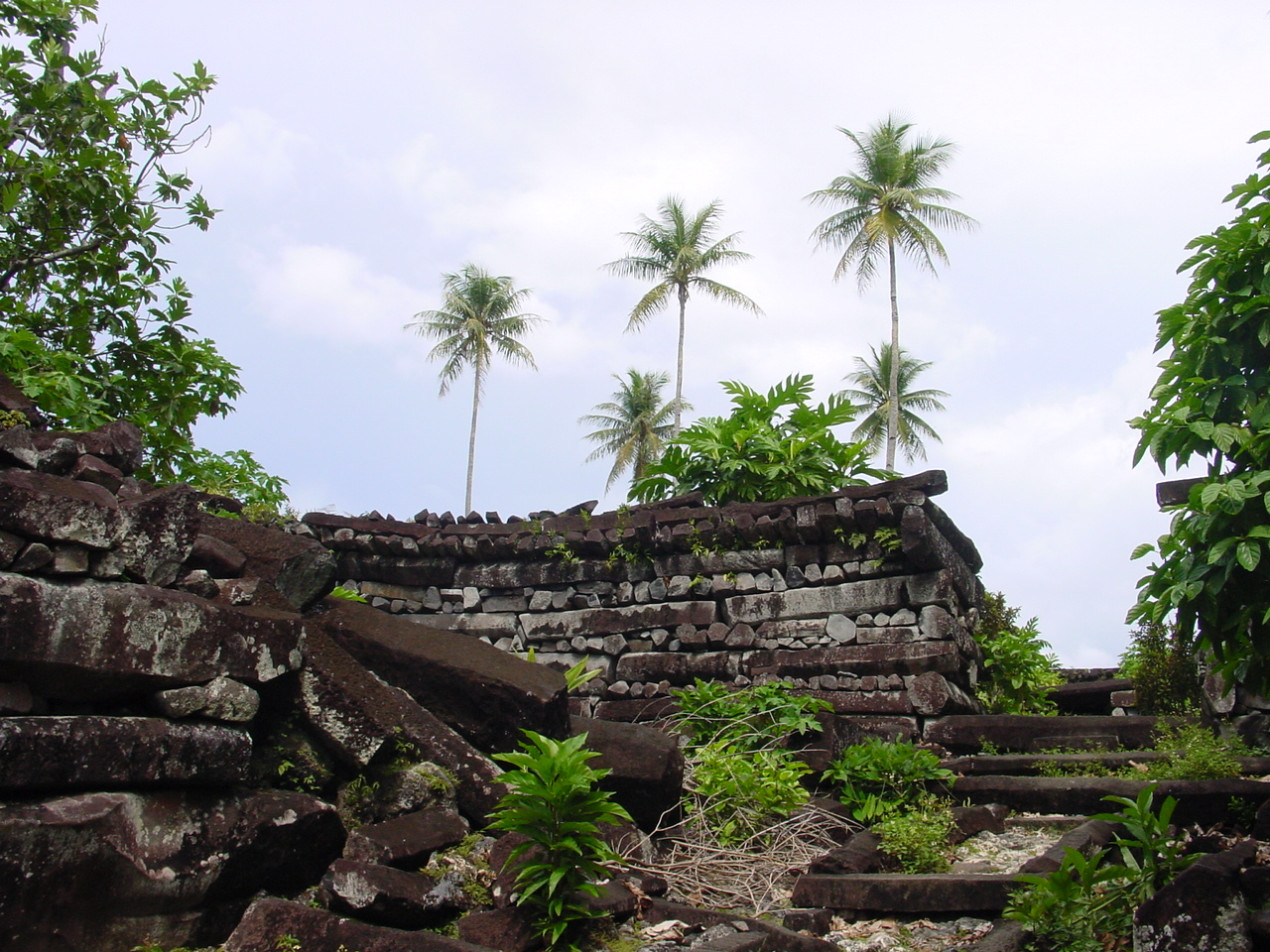

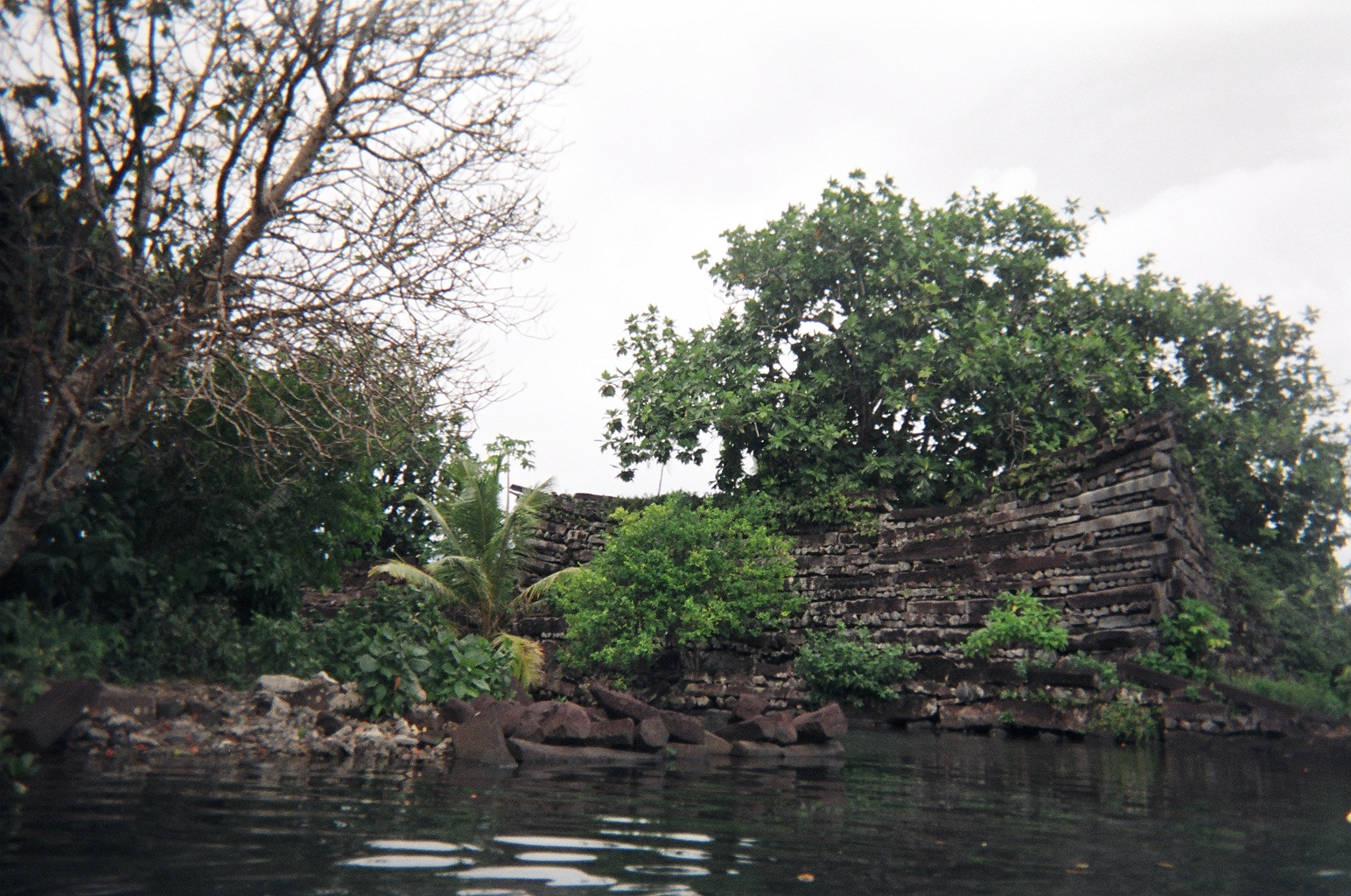

== See also ==
- List of places with columnar jointed volcanics
- Nation – a novel that spotlights a lost Pacific advanced civilization
