= Federated States of Micronesia Football Association =

Governing body of association football in the Federated States of Micronesia

- Founded: 1999 (Original); 2023 (current format)
- Headquarters: Kolonia, Pohnpei, FS Micronesia
- FIFA affiliation: Not Affiliated
- OFC Not Affiliated
- President: (Federated States of Micronesia) Alex Panuelo
- Website: Official website

The Federated States of Micronesia Football Association or FSMFA is the governing body of football in the Federated States of Micronesia, and of the national team. They are not a member of FIFA or a regional confederation.

== History ==
=== 2023: FSMFA Comeback ===
In 2023, the Federated States of Micronesia Football Association (FSMFA) successfully orchestrated its inaugural tournament, namely the "2023 Micronesian Futsal Cup," bringing together the four constituent states of the Federated States of Micronesia. This momentous event not only marked a significant milestone in the region's sporting history but also served as a pivotal occasion for the inception of the newly proposed Federated States of Micronesia Football Association.

The 2023 Micronesian Futsal Cup showcased the growing futsal talents within the FSM, highlighting the passion for the sport across the nation. The tournament fostered friendly competition and facilitated an environment conducive to strengthening regional football cooperation and camaraderie.

Moreover, during the 2023 Micronesian Futsal Cup, a meeting was held towards forming the new Federated States of Micronesia Football Association. The meeting provided a platform for constructive dialogue and collaborative decision-making, ultimately shaping the foundation of a unified governing body for football in the FSM.

On July 7, 2023, the Federated States of Micronesia Football Association (FSMFA) was re-established with Brian Southwick from Yap appointed as president. The FSMFA Executive Committee represents all four states and is focused on achieving membership in the Asian Football Confederation (AFC) or Oceania Football Confederation (OFC) and FIFA. In a July 2023 interview with the Daily Mirror, Southwick stated that the goal was to join the OFC because of the level of competition and proximity to other members.

== Champions in 2021 ==
Nimgil were crowned champions in 2021.

Team	Location	Stadium	Capacity
Nimgil	Abay	Yap Sports Complex	2,000

== See also ==
- Yap Soccer Association
