= Japanese Shrine (Pohnpei) =

- U.S. National Register of Historic Places
- Location within Federated States of Micronesia
- Location: Kolonia, Pohnpei, Federated States of Micronesia
- Coordinates: 6°57′51″N 158°12′45″E
- Area: 0.1 acres (0.040 ha)
- Built: 1921
- NRHP reference No.: 76002205
- Added to NRHP: September 30, 1976

The Japanese Shrine is a Shinto shrine in Kolonia, the capital of Pohnpei State in the Federated States of Micronesia. The official name at that time was Japanese: 南洋庁ポナペ国民学校奉安殿, romanized: Nan'yō Chō Ponape Kokumin Gakkō Hō-an-den, lit. 'Nan'yō Government Ponape National School Hōanden'.

It is a concrete structure, about 8 by 4 feet (2.4 m × 1.2 m) and 10–12 feet (3.0–3.7 m) in height. It is set on a raised platform accessed by a small flight of concrete steps, and has a steeply pitched gable roof. The shrine was built in the 1920s, when Pohnpei was part of the Japanese-administered South Seas Mandate, and stands in what was then the grounds of the school erected by the Japanese for the education of Japanese dependents living on the island (Nan'yō Government Ponape National School, built in the 1926). It is one of the surviving reminders of the Japanese administration of Pohnpei, and its segregationist practices.

The shrine was listed on the United States National Register of Historic Places in 1976, when the region was part of the US-administered Trust Territory of the Pacific Islands.
