= German Cemetery =

United States historic place in Micronesia

- U.S. National Register of Historic Places
- Location within Federated States of Micronesia
- Location: Kolonia, Pohnpei, Federated States of Micronesia
- Coordinates: 6°57′7″N 158°12′58″E
- Area: 0.4 acres (0.16 ha)
- Built: 1910
- NRHP reference No.: 76002201
- Added to NRHP: September 30, 1976

The German Cemetery is a historic cemetery in Kolonia, the capital of Pohnpei State in the Federated States of Micronesia. Pohnpei and the other Caroline Islands had become a German protectorate in 1899, after the Spanish–American War, and were administered as part of German New Guinea. This cemetery is a historical reminder of the period of German administration, although it was in deteriorated condition in 1976, accessible only by hiking through a mangrove swamp, with its wrought iron fence and gate in disrepair. Two German governors were buried here.

The cemetery was listed on the United States National Register of Historic Places in 1976, when the region was part of the US-administered Trust Territory of the Pacific Islands.
