= Catholic Belltower =

- U.S. National Register of Historic Places
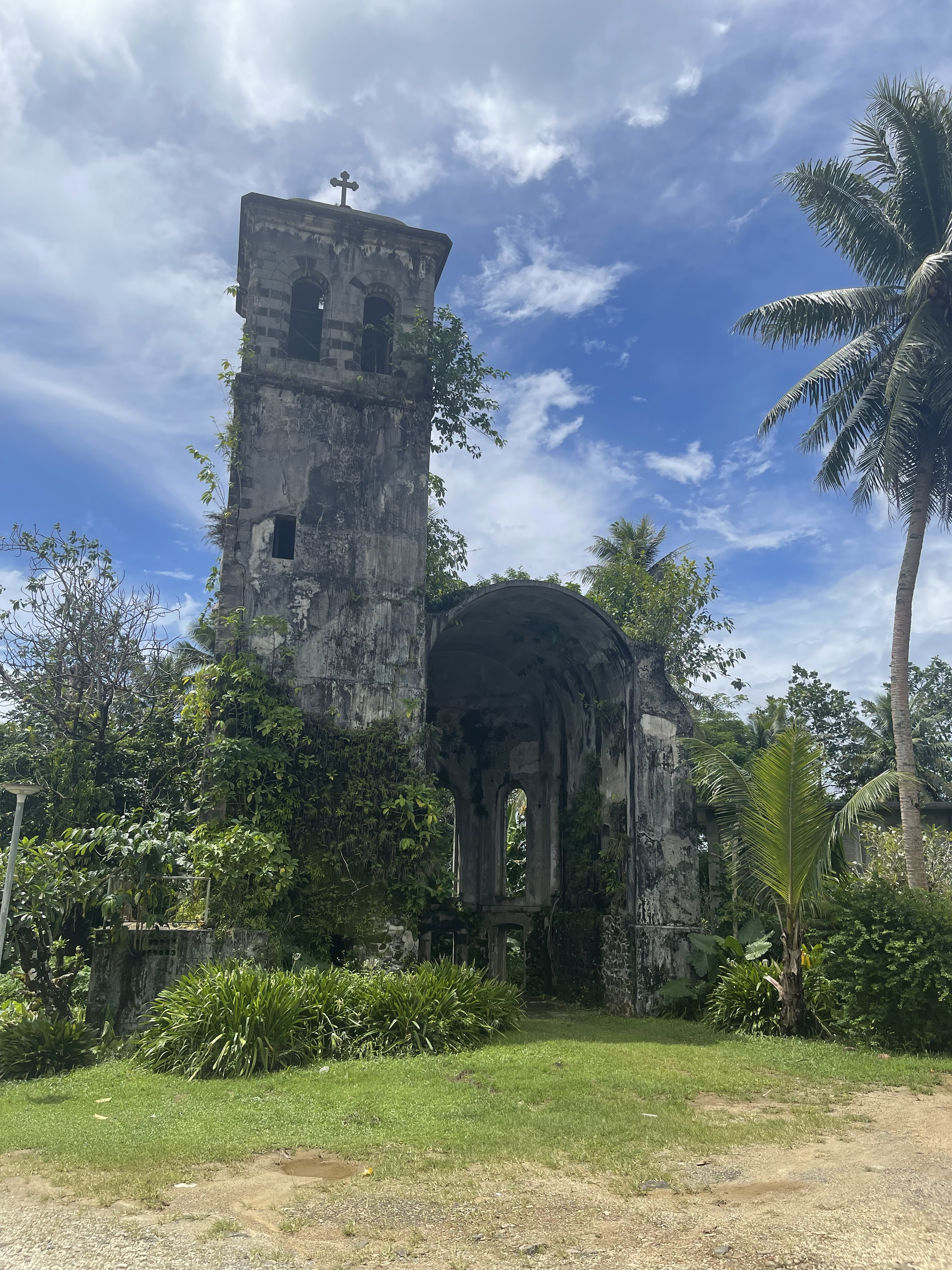

- Location within Federated States of Micronesia
- Location: Catholic Mission, Kolonia Pohnpei, Federated States of Micronesia
- Coordinates: 6°58′6.3″N 158°12′41.3″E
- Area: less than one acre
- Built: 1909
- Built by: Capuchin Fathers
- NRHP reference No.: 80004399
- Added to NRHP: November 25, 1980

The Catholic Belltower (also known as the Cathedral of Ponape Belltower and Ponape Belltower) is a historic tower at the Catholic Mission in Kolonia, on the island of Pohnpei in the Federated States of Micronesia. The belltower and adjoining masonry apse are all that remain of a church built in 1909 by German and Spanish Capuchin missionaries, when Ponape and the other Caroline Islands were administered as part of German New Guinea. The rest of the church was destroyed during the fighting of World War II. The tower is 4.8 square metres (52 sq ft), rising to a height of 20.7 metres (68 ft), and the shell of the apse is about 10 metres (33 ft) in height. The tower has a foundation of basalt rock and lime mortar, and is constructed out of concrete bricks.

The tower and apse were listed on the United States National Register of Historic Places in 1980.
