= 2023 Micronesian Futsal Cup =

FSM Futsal Cup 2023

Tournament details
- Host country: Pohnpei
- City: Kolonia
- Dates: 8–15 July
- Teams: 4
- Venue(s): 1 (in 1 host city)

Final positions
- Champions: Yap (1st title)
- Runners-up: Kosrae
- Third place: Pohnpei
- Fourth place: Chuuk

Tournament statistics
- Matches played: 10
- Goals scored: 133 (13.3 per match)
- Best player(s): (Yap State) Maphrick Ruweday
- Best young player: (Kosrae) Yobi Laurdine
- Best goalkeeper: (Kosrae) Nick Santiago

The 2023 Micronesian Futsal Cup, commonly referred to as Micro Cup 2023, was the inaugural edition of the Micronesian Futsal Cup, the international futsal championship organised by Federated States of Micronesia Football Association for the men's national teams of Micronesia. It was the first competition of any kind for the FSM islands for five years (since the three islands participated in the 2018 Micronesian Games) and its first futsal event.

Yap emerged as the champions of the tournament by defeating Kosrae in the final with a score of 9 to 7. Kosrae, making their debut in a futsal or football competition, secured the second position.

== Format ==
The tournament follows a two-stage structure consisting of a group and a knockout stage.

- Group stage: all participating teams compete against each other once, determining their rankings and seedings for the subsequent knockout stage.
- knockout stage: the winners from the group stage are paired against the fourth-ranked team, while the second-ranked team faces off against the third-ranked team. The Winners of each semi-final match will then proceed to the final.

== Participating nations ==
On 14 February 2023, the Four states of Federated States of Micronesia (Chuuk, Kosrae, Pohnpei and Yap) were confirmed as participants with invitations being sent to other nations in the region. However, they did not appear on the final list of participants.

Team	App	Last	Best placement in the tournament
Chuuk	1st	—	debut
Kosrae	1st	—	debut
Pohnpei	1st	—	debut
Yap	1st	—	debut

== Squads ==
Pohnpei
No	Player
6	Lester James
7	Steven Laurdine
8	Zack Henly
10	Shawn Silbenuz
11	Phillip Camriche
14	Galiart James
22	Paul Ryan
33	MacArthur James

Yap
No	Player
1	Dylan Tangrus
3	Robert Guswel
4	Jarret Tailig
7	Maphrick Ruweday
10	Sean Southwick
13	Myles Mailing

Chuuk
No	Player
1	Micah Nittu
5	Season Elimo
7	Robert Vonvon
8	K-Kin Kin
10	Daichy Rudolph
11	Luke Kayden Mersai
12	Mark Nittu
13	Texter Rain

Kosrae
No	Player
3	Kenny Aldana
7	Khriis Diau
8	Yobi Laurdine
9	Nick Santiago
10	Travis Henly
11	Frankie Donre

== Group Stage ==
Pos	Team	Pld	W	D	L	GF	GA	GD	Pts	Qualification
1	Kosrae	3	2	0	1	21	14	+7	6	Semi-final 1
2	Yap	3	2	0	1	19	16	+3	6	Semi-final 2
3	Pohnpei (H)	3	1	0	2	18	19	−1	3	Semi-final 2
4	Chuuk	3	1	0	2	16	25	−9	3	Semi-final 1

Rules for classification: Group stage tiebreakers
(H) Hosts
8 July 2023
16:00 UTC+11

Pohnpei	10–3	Chuuk
	Report

Pohnpei Public Gymnasium, Kolonia
8 July 2023
18:00 UTC+11

Kosrae	7–2	Yap
	Report	Mailing; Southwick

Pohnpei Public Gymnasium, Kolonia

9 July 2023
16:00 UTC+11

Pohnpei	1–6	Yap
	Report	Ruweday; Mailing; Guswel

Pohnpei Public Gymnasium, Kolonia
9 July 2023
18:00 UTC+11

Kosrae	4–5	Chuuk
	Report

Pohnpei Public Gymnasium, Kolonia

10 July 2023
16:00 UTC+11

Pohnpei	7–10	Kosrae
	Report

Pohnpei Public Gymnasium, Kolonia
10 July 2023
18:00 UTC+11

Yap	11–8	Chuuk
Ruweday; Mailing; Guswel	Report

Pohnpei Public Gymnasium, Kolonia

== Knockout stage ==
Semi-finals
12 July- Pohnpei Public Gymnasium
Kosrae	9
Chuuk	2
12 July- Pohnpei Public Gymnasium
Yap	10
Pohnpei	5

Final
14 July - Pohnpei Public Gymnasium
Kosrae	7
Yap	9
Third place
14 July - Pohnpei Public Gymnasium
Chuuk	5
Pohnpei	12

=== Semi-finals ===
12 July 2023
16:00 UTC+11

Kosrae	9–2	Chuuk
	Report

Pohnpei Public Gymnasium, Kolonia
12 July 2023
18:00 UTC+11

Yap	10–5	Pohnpei
Ruweday; Guswel; Mailing; Southwick	Report

Pohnpei Public Gymnasium, Kolonia

=== Third place Match ===
14 July 2023
16:00 UTC+11

Chuuk	5–12	Pohnpei
	Report

Pohnpei Public Gymnasium, Kolonia

=== Final ===
14 July 2023
18:00 UTC+11

Kosrae	7–9	Yap
	Report	Ruweday; Southwick

Pohnpei Public Gymnasium, Kolonia

== Goalscorers ==
- this only include Yap's Goalscorers published by the Yap Football Association.

There were 38 goals scored in 5 matches, for an average of 7.6 goals per match.

22 goals

- (Yap State) Maphrick Ruweday

8 goals

- (Yap State) Myles Mailing

5 goals

- (Yap State) Robert Guswel

3 goals

- (Yap State) Sean Southwick

== Marketing ==
=== Branding ===
The official emblem was designed by Canadian Noah Wheelock and unveiled in April 2023. it features the lorikeet to represent the host Pohnpei. the bird was surrounded by a blue circle and several blue stars to show the unity of the Federated States of Micronesia.

=== Sponsorship ===
- (United Kingdom) HA7 Classical Shirts
