= Spanish Wall =

- U.S. National Register of Historic Places
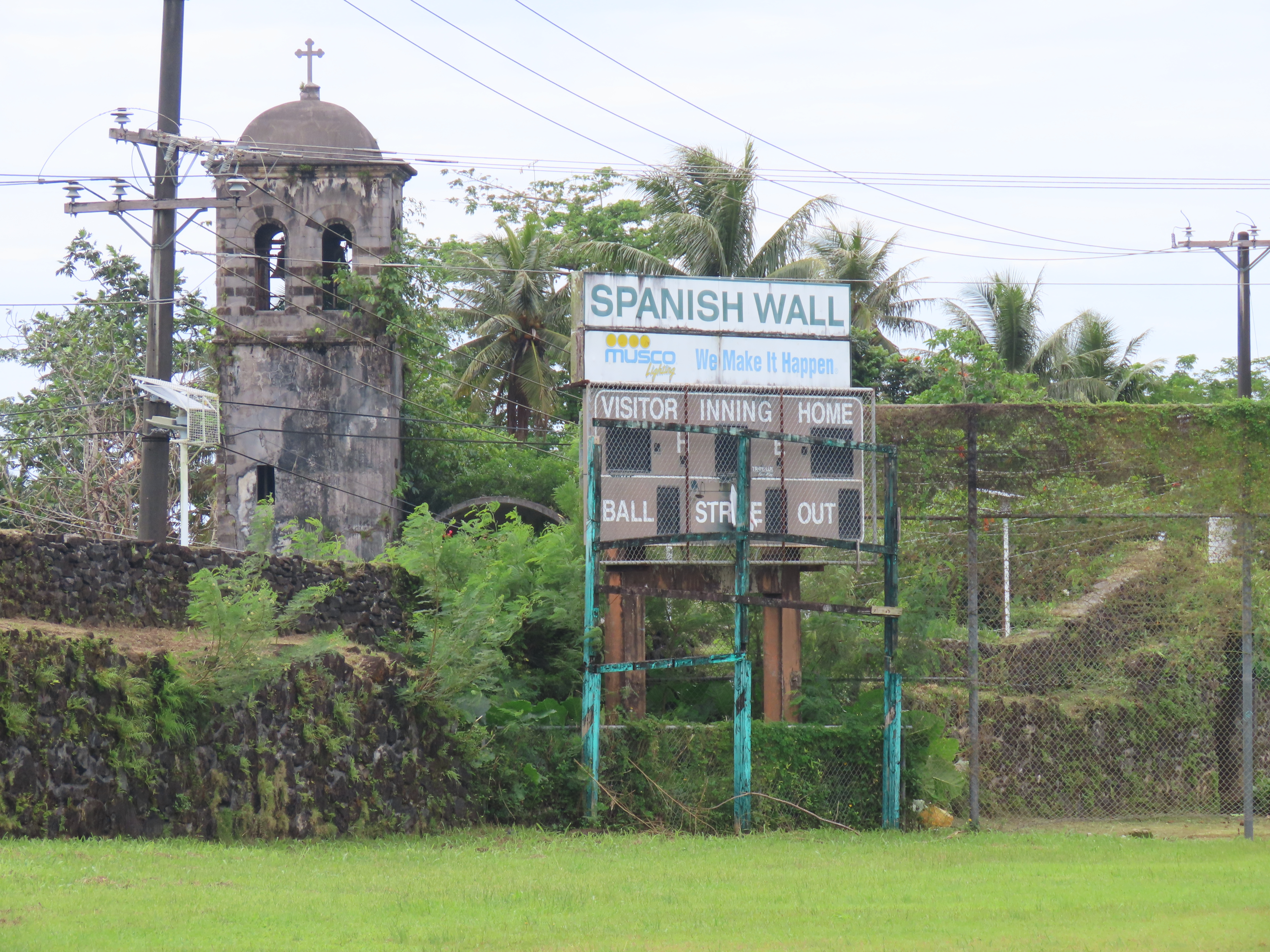

- Location within Federated States of Micronesia
- Location: Litkin Kel, Kolonia, Pohnpei State, Federated States of Micronesia
- Coordinates: 6°58′4″N 158°12′42″E
- Area: less than one acre
- Built: 1887
- NRHP reference No.: 74002227
- Added to NRHP: December 19, 1974

The Spanish Wall is the deteriorating remnant of Spanish Fort Alphonso XIII in Kolonia, the capital of Pohnpei State in the Federated States of Micronesia. When built, the wall was about 0.5 miles (0.80 km) in length and 8 feet (2.4 m) in height with a parapet that ranged in height from 2–3 feet (0.61–0.91 m). The wall was built by Spanish administrators of Pohnpei in 1887 after a local uprising drove the local Spanish authorities onto a ship in the harbor. Most of the wall was taken down by the German administration that took over in the early 20th century, after the Spanish–American War. The remains of the wall, about 700 feet (210 m) and two arches, are now part of a local park.

The wall was listed on the United States National Register of Historic Places in 1974, a time when Pohnpei was part of the US-administered Trust Territory of the Pacific Islands.
