= Lidorkini Museum =

Museum in the Federated States of Micronesia

- Type: National museum
- Location: Kolonia, Pohnpei
- Region served: Federated States of Micronesia
- Services: Cultural heritage

The Lidorkini Museum was a museum in Kolonia on the island of Pohnpei, in the Federated States of Micronesia.

== History ==
The first iteration of the Lidorkini Museum opened in June 1976, under its former name, Ponape Museum. It closed several years later due to two factors: lack of support from the state and an additional challenge in that local communities did not see the museum as relevant to their lives. The museum and its collections also suffered flood damage. By 1988 the collections were moved into storage by Russel Brulotte, to a building owned by the Department of Lands.

The museum re-opened in June 1992. It was established by Pensile Lawrence. In 1994 the museum transferred from the Department of Land of the FSM, to the Department of Education. The curator at this time was Yasuo I. Yamada. The museum was close to the Pohnpei Tax and Revenue Office, the Department of Education and Spanish Wall Park. The museum closed in 2012.

== Collection ==
The museum collection included cultural objects, such as adzes and shell pounders, as well as archaeological artefacts such as pottery sherds and beads from the site of Nan Madol. The collection also included Second World War material, including a Japanese tank, as well as engineering braces from the German Bell Tower.
