= Our Lady of Mercy Catholic High School (Micronesia) =

Location
- Kolonia, Pohnpei State; Federated States of Micronesia
- Coordinates: 6°58′04″N 158°12′43″E

Information
- Type: High school
- Website: olmchs.edu.fm

Our Lady Of Mercy Catholic High School (OLMCHS) is a Catholic school located in the Kolonia, Pohnpei Island, Pohnpei State, Federated States of Micronesia. OLMCHS is an academic high school. It is being staffed by the Spanish Mercederian Sisters and volunteers from the United States of America and Latin America.

== See also ==
- Education in the Federated States of Micronesia
