= Otto Fischer =

Otto Fischer may refer to:

- O. W. Fischer (1915–2004), Austrian film and theatre actor
- Otto Fischer, aka Otto Fischer Sobell (1862–1934), Australian opera singer
- Otto Fischer (footballer) (1901–1941), Austrian football player and coach
