= Kolonia =

Place in Pohnpei, Federated States of Micronesia

Coordinates: 6°57′50″N 158°12′29″E

- Municipality
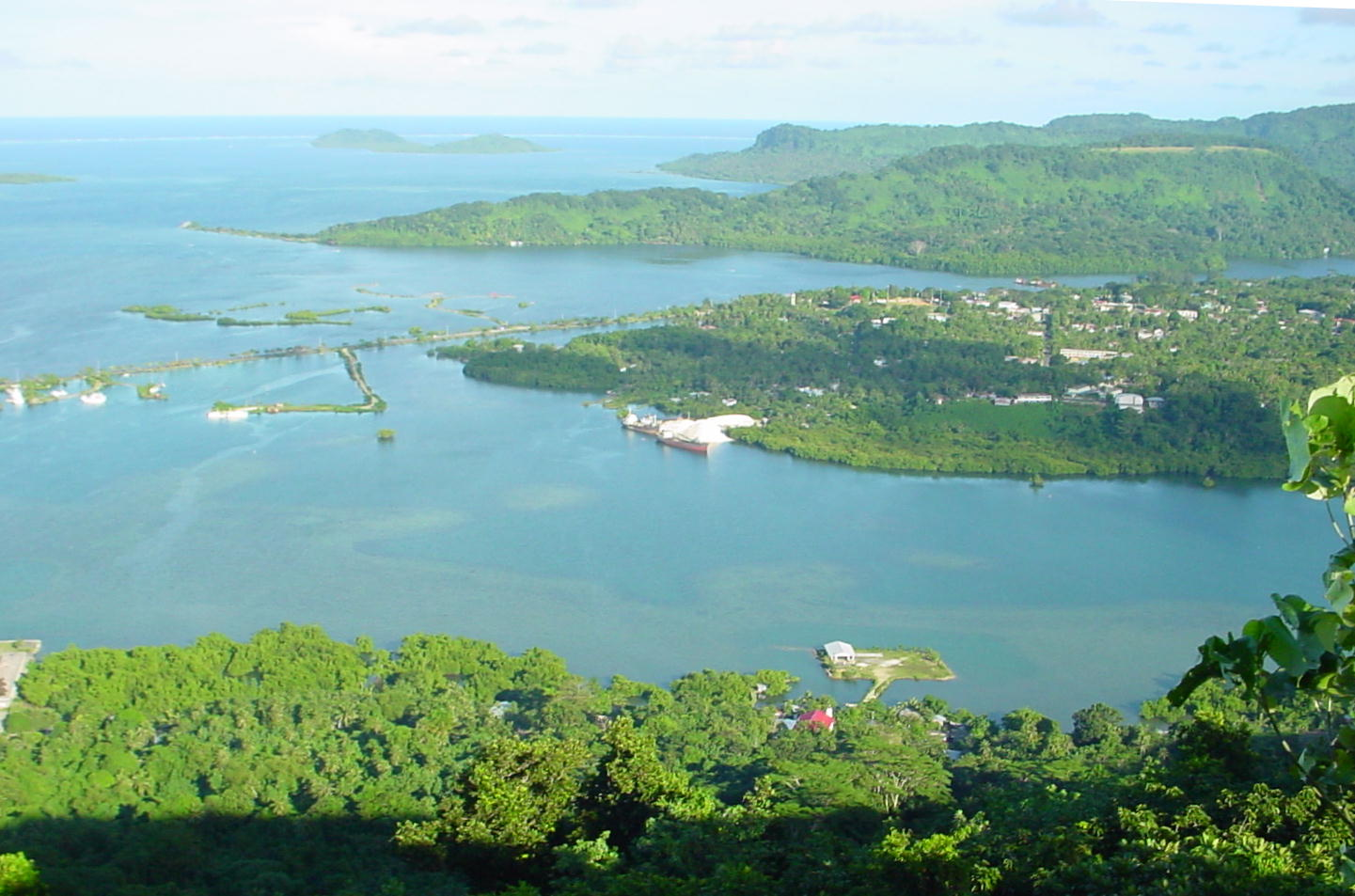
- Kolonia Town, looking down from Sokehs Ridge in December 2003.

- Flag

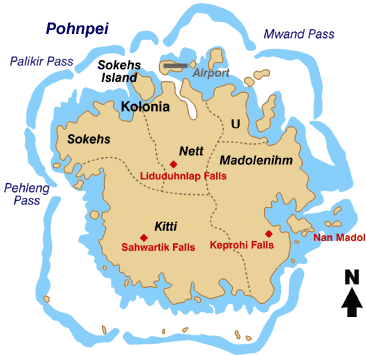
- Map of Pohnpei Island showing the municipalities
- Country: Federated States of Micronesia
- State: Pohnpei State

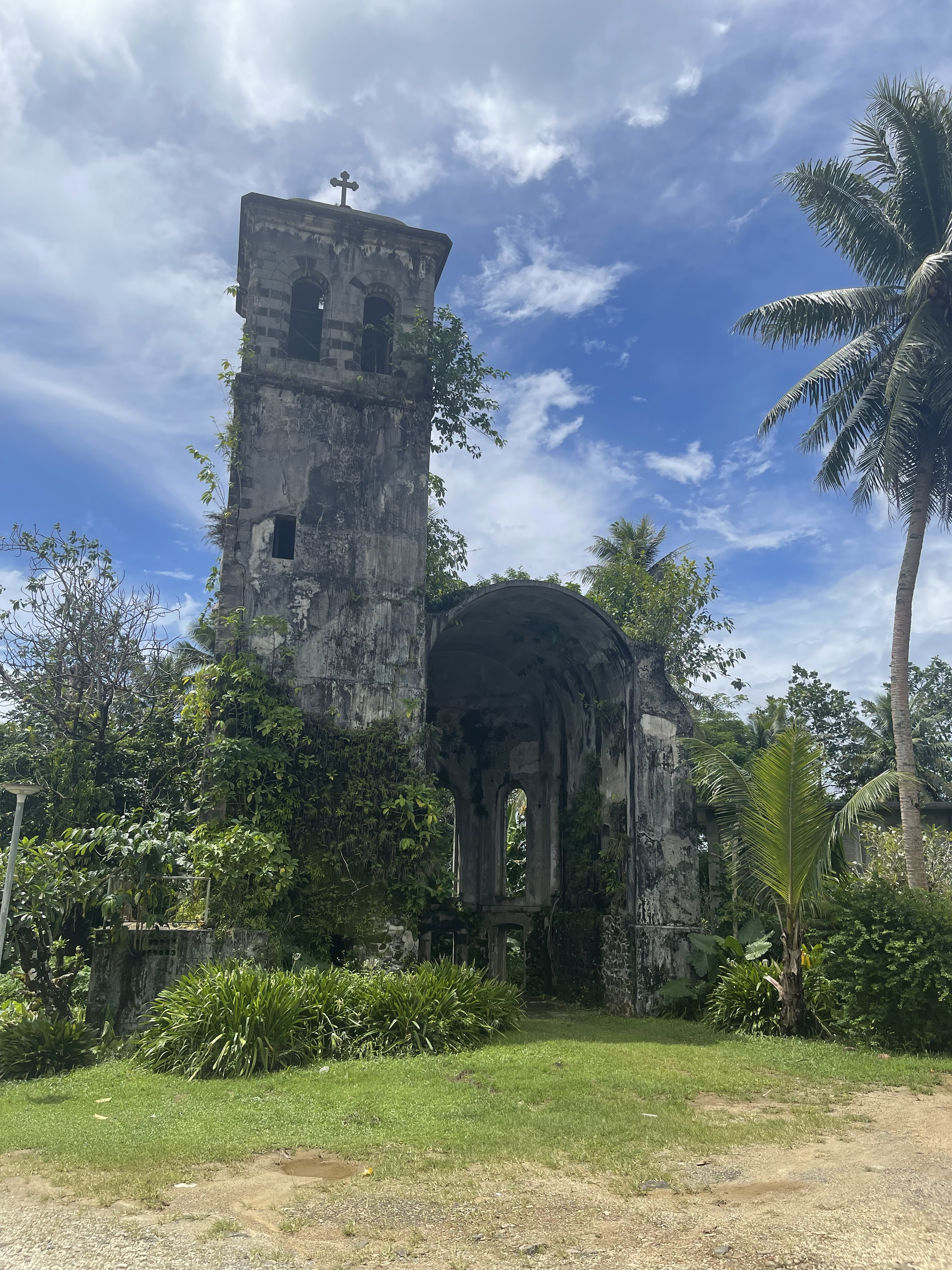
Catholic Belltower

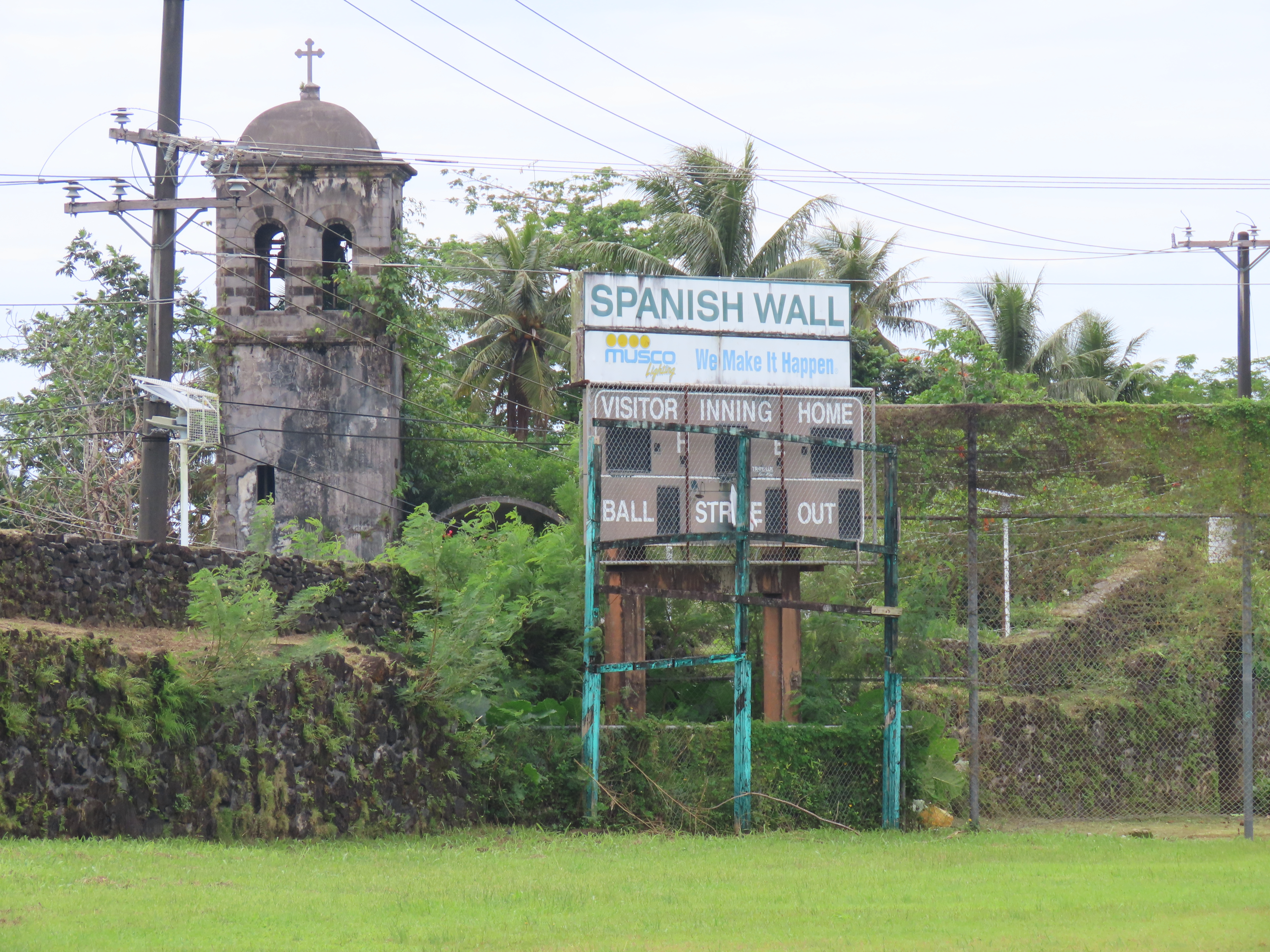
Spanish Wall

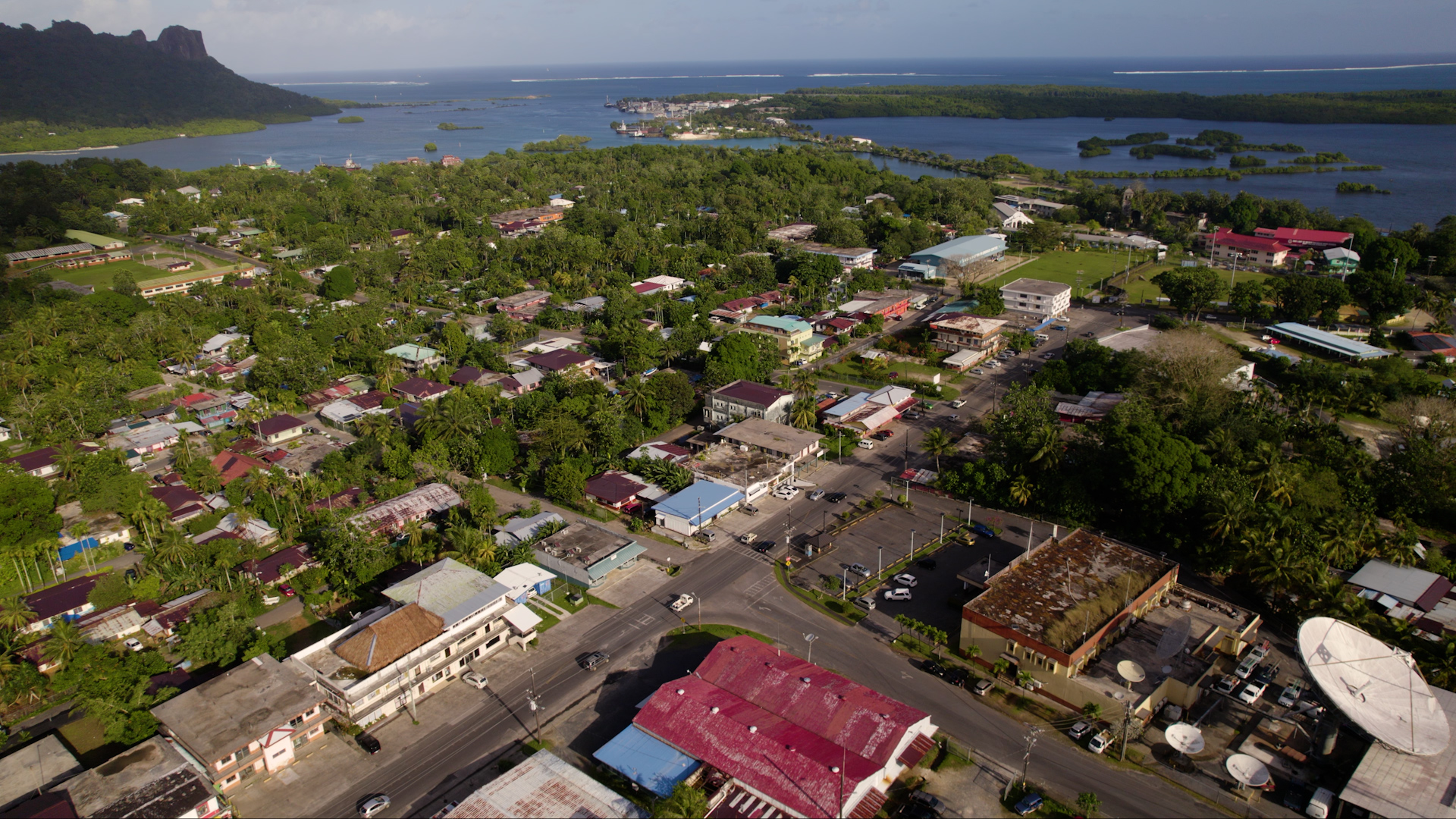
Looking out over Kolonia Town with iconic Sokehs Rock and the Pohnpei State Airport in the distance

Kolonia is a coastal town and the capital of Pohnpei State in the Federated States of Micronesia (FSM). It is not to be confused with the far smaller Colonia, the capital of the State of Yap. It was also the former FSM capital before being replaced by Palikir in 1989, located nearby to the southwest in the municipality of Sokehs. It has a population of 6,074.

== Description ==
Kolonia Town is located in the north central section of Pohnpei Island. It was formerly part of Nett municipality but has been a separate municipality since May 1965. The population of the town was 6,074 (2010 Census). It is the largest population center on Pohnpei and the commercial hub of the island. The land area of Kolonia amounts to 1.5 km^{2}, with a large number of buildings lying just outside the town limits. The official languages are Pohnpeian and English.

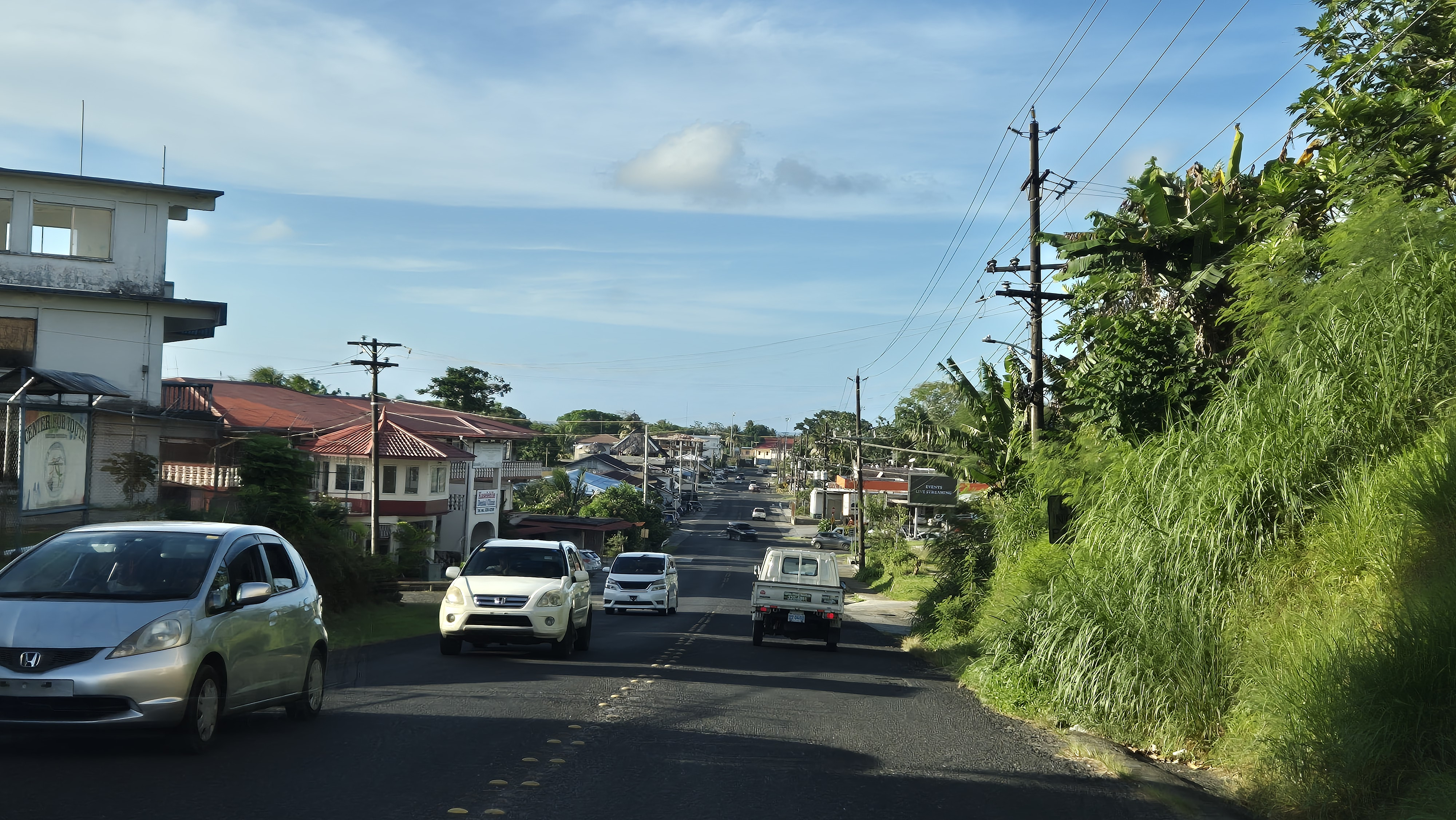
Kaselehlie Street, the main commercial street of Kolonia, April 2025

== History ==
Kolonia's history is deeply marked by Pohnpei's multiple foreign occupiers, and evidence of their former presence is found throughout the town and island. Traditionally, Pohnpei's power center was in Madolenihmw, on the southeastern part of the island. The area now known as Kolonia was called Mesenieng, which means "face of the wind" or "headwind." Spain first built the town in 1887 as an administrative and military capital and named it Santiago de la Ascensión. A fort, from which ruins known as the Spanish Wall remain, was built to protect the colonial government and garrison.

In 1899, as a consequence of the Spanish–American War, Germany purchased Pohnpei from Spain along with the rest of the Caroline Islands and established district offices in Kolonia. Roads and wharves were built and buildings erected (a church bell tower and cemetery remain), but the town stayed relatively small as few German or other foreign settlers arrived to live on the island. Kolonia and northern Pohnpei were devastated by a typhoon in 1905.

Japan occupied Pohnpei in the first weeks of World War I as well as other German islands north of the equator. Unlike previous occupiers, the Japanese brought thousands of settlers to Micronesia, who outnumbered the indigenous population on some islands. These settlers, most of whom were Okinawans, vastly expanded the infrastructure in addition to establishing settlements elsewhere on Pohnpei. Visitors to Kolonia in the 1930s reported that they were able to walk the length of Namiki Street (now Kaselelhie Street) under shopkeepers' canopies without getting wet in the rain.

During World War II, much of Kolonia was destroyed as some 118 tons of American bombs, 600 incendiaries and naval artillery targeted the town and island installations. Pohnpei was bypassed during the amphibious island hopping campaigns, but rusting wrecks of Japanese military equipment, downed airplanes and bunkers are still visible throughout the island. The town was rebuilt and expanded during the US Navy and later the US Department of the Interior administrations. The Federated States of Micronesia Constitutional Referendum and the Compact of Free Association led to independence in 1986.

Today, construction in various parts of town continues and all of Kolonia's primary and secondary streets are paved and street signs erected. Kolonia Town boasts Pohnpei State government offices, public and private schools, grocery stores, restaurants, bars, hotels and houses of worship of various religious denominations.

Pohnpei International Airport (IATA code: PNI) is located on the small island Deketik and is connected to Kolonia via the Deketik causeway.

The United States, Australia, China and Japan maintain embassies in Kolonia, although the Federation's capital is now at Palikir. A number of foreign volunteer groups operate in Kolonia, including the Peace Corps, the Japan Overseas Cooperation Volunteers (JOCV or JICA), WorldTeach, the Red Cross, the Jesuit Volunteer Corps, the Spanish Mercedarian Missionaries of Berriz, the Conservation Society of Pohnpei (CSP), and Pacific Missionary Aviation (PMA).

== Sights ==
The Catholic Belltower built by the Germans/Spanish in 1909, the German Cemetery founded in 1910, the Spanish Wall dating from 1887 and the Japanese Shrine built in 1921 are worth a visit in Kolonia itself. The famous archaeological site Nan Madol is in the southeast of the island.

== Climate ==
Climate data for Kolonia
Month	Jan	Feb	Mar	Apr	May	Jun	Jul	Aug	Sep	Oct	Nov	Dec	Year
Mean daily maximum °C (°F)	29 (84)	29 (84)	29 (85)	29 (85)	29 (85)	29 (85)	30 (86)	30 (86)	30 (86)	30 (86)	29 (85)	29 (84)	29 (85)
Mean daily minimum °C (°F)	26 (78)	26 (78)	26 (79)	26 (78)	26 (78)	25 (77)	24 (76)	24 (76)	24 (76)	24 (76)	25 (77)	26 (78)	25 (77)
Average precipitation mm (inches)	300 (11.9)	260 (10.3)	350 (13.9)	450 (17.8)	500 (19.7)	430 (17.1)	450 (17.6)	420 (16.5)	400 (15.8)	420 (16.5)	410 (16.3)	430 (17)	4,840 (190.7)
Source: Weatherbase

== Education ==
Pohnpei State Department of Education operates public schools:

- Pohnpei Island Central School (former Pacific Island Central School or PICS)
- Kolonia Elementary School
- Ohmine Elementary School

Private schools:

- Calvary Christian Academy
- Seventh-day Adventist High School
- Our Lady of Mercy Catholic High School in Kolonia

Lidorkini Museum was located in Kolonia until its closure in 2012.

== See also ==
- Madolenihmw
- Kitti (municipality)
- U, Pohnpei
- Nett
- Kapingamarangi
- Pingelap
- Sapwuahfik
- Nukuoro
- Mokil
- Sokehs
- Oroluk
- Palikir
