= Pohnpei =

Island in Micronesia

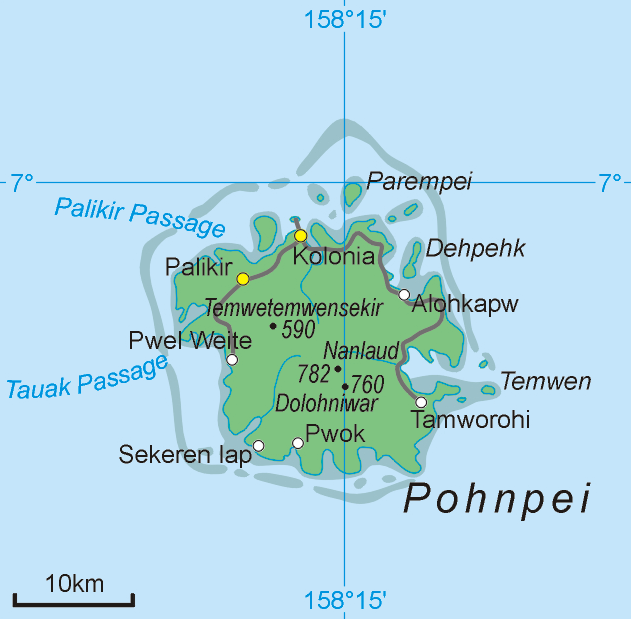
- Map of Pohnpei

Geography
- Coordinates: 06°54′00″N 158°13′30″E
- Archipelago: Senyavin Islands
- Adjacent to: Pacific Ocean
- Area: 334 km^{2} (129 sq mi)
- Highest elevation: 782 m (2566 ft)
- Highest point: Mount Nanlaud

Administration
- Federated States of Micronesia
- State: Pohnpei
- Largest settlement: Kolonia (pop. 6,074)

Demographics
- Population: 36,832 (2020)

Pohnpei in Micronesia

Pohnpei (formerly known as Ponape or Ascension, from Pohnpeian: "upon (pohn) a stone altar (pei)") is an island of the Senyavin Islands which are part of the larger Caroline Islands group. It belongs to Pohnpei State, one of the four states in the Federated States of Micronesia (FSM). Major population centers on Pohnpei include Palikir, the FSM's capital, and Kolonia, the capital of Pohnpei State. Pohnpei is the largest island in the FSM, with an area of 334 km^{2} (129 sq mi), and a highest point of 782 m (2,566 ft), the most populous with 36,832 people, and the most developed single island in the FSM.

Pohnpei is home to the megaliths and ruined city of Nan Madol, built of artificial islands off the island's eastern shore beginning in the 8th or 9th century. An important archaeological site, it was declared a national historic site in 1985.

Pohnpei contains a wealth of biodiversity. It is one of the wettest places on Earth with annual recorded rainfall exceeding 7,600 mm (300 in) each year in certain mountainous locations. It is home to the ka tree (Terminalia carolinensis) found only in Pohnpei and Kosrae.

== Name ==
The name Pohnpei comes from the Pohnpeian language, literally meaning "upon a stone altar". It derives from a Proto-Chuukic-Pohnpeic phrase *fawo ni pei of the same meaning. Cognates in other Micronesian languages include Mokilese Pohnpei and Chuukese Fóónupi.

== History ==
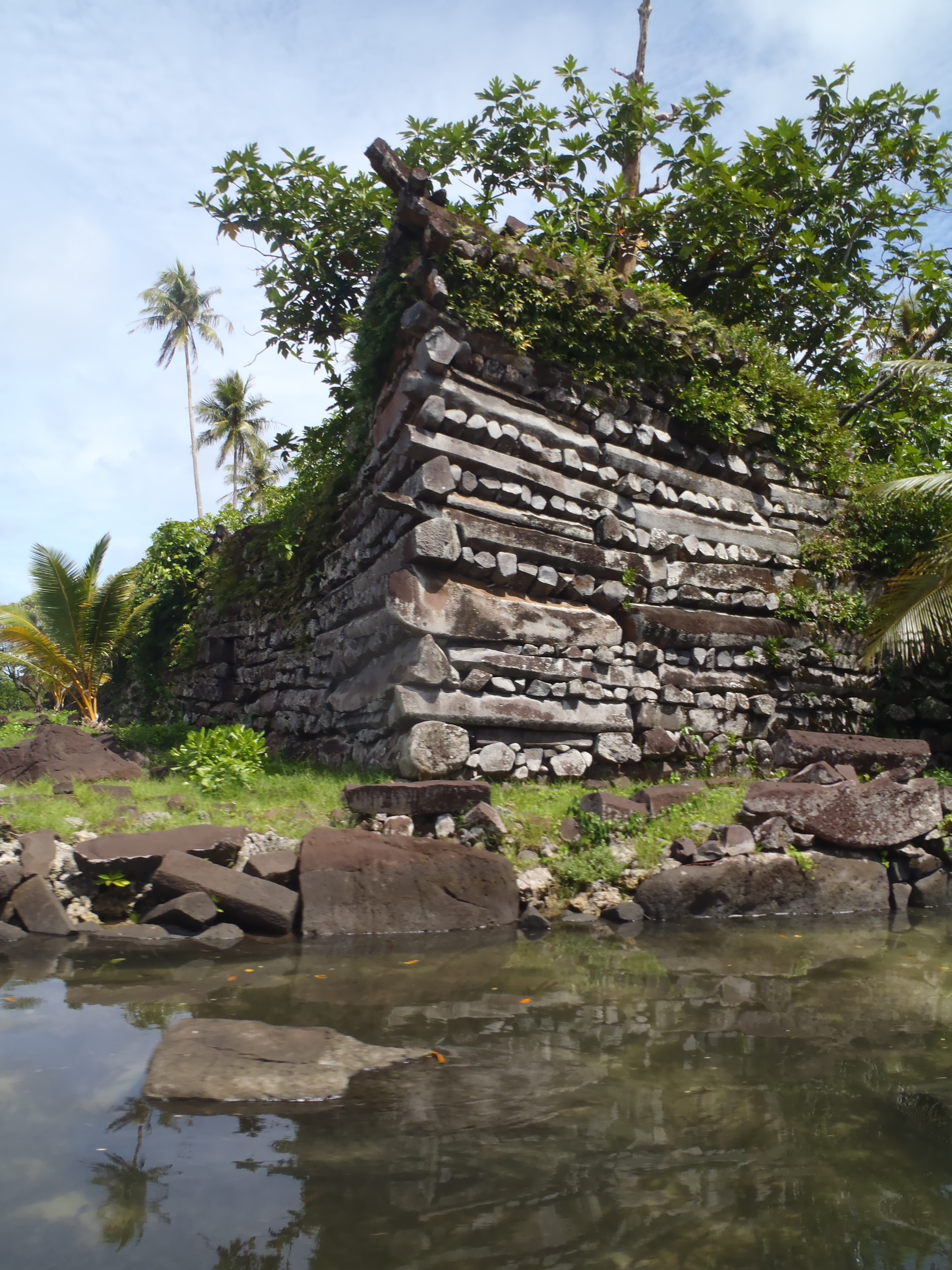
Ruins of Nan Madol, one of the megalithic sites of the Pacific

The natives of Pohnpei, especially the 'older' generations, often refer to events in their past as having occurred, e.g., in "German times" or "before the Spaniards", which identifies the historical periods:

Period	Years
Native period	Before 1825
Pre-Spanish period	1825–1886
Spanish period	1886–1899
German period	1899–1914
Japanese period	1914–1945
US period	1945–1986
Independence period	Since 1986

=== Pre-colonial history ===
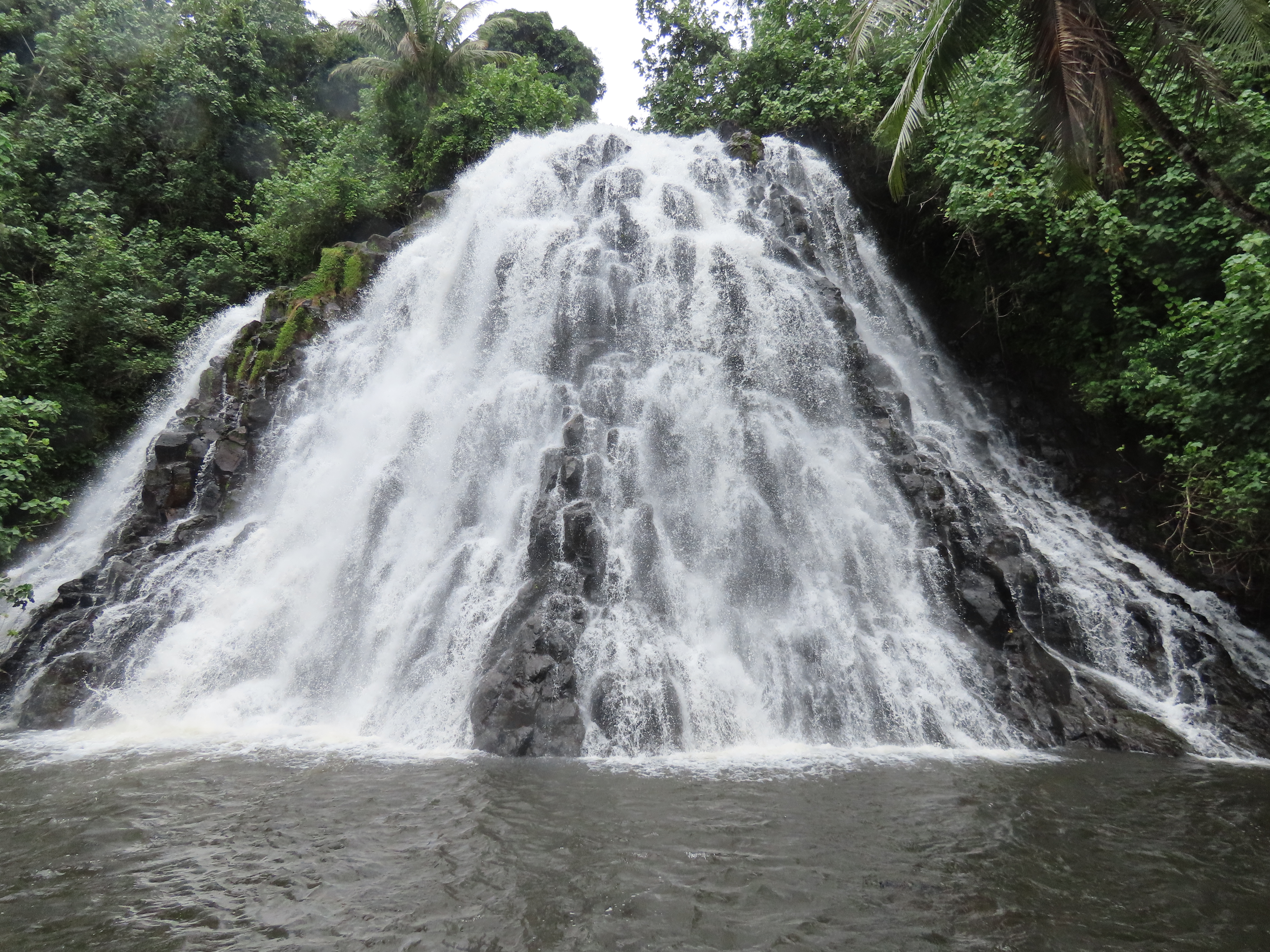
Kepirohi Waterfall, Pohnpei

The earliest settlers were probably Lapita culture people from the Southeast Solomon Islands or the Vanuatu archipelago. Pre-colonial history is divided into three eras: Mwehin Kawa or Mwehin Aramas (Period of Building, or Period of Peopling, before c. 1100); Mwehin Sau Deleur (Period of the Lord of Deleur, c. 1100 to c. 1628); (Note: The Saudeleur era lasted around 500 years. Legend generally dates their downfall to the 1500s, however, archaeologists date Saudeleur ruins to c. 1628.) and Mwehin Nahnmwarki (Period of the Nahnmwarki, c. 1628 to c. 1885). Pohnpeian legend recounts that the Saudeleur rulers, the first to bring government to Pohnpei, were of foreign origin. The Saudeleur centralized form of absolute rule is characterized in Pohnpeian legend as becoming increasingly oppressive over several generations. Arbitrary and onerous demands, as well as a reputation for offending Pohnpeian deities, sowed resentment among Pohnpeians. The Saudeleur Dynasty ended with the invasion of Isokelekel, another semi-mythical foreigner, who replaced the Saudeleur rule with the more decentralized nahnmwarki system in existence today.

Pohnpeian historic society was highly structured into five tribes, various clans and sub-clans; each tribe headed by two principal chiefs. The tribes were organized on a feudal basis. In theory, "all land belonged to the chiefs, who received regular tribute and whose rule was absolute." Punishments administered by chiefs included death and banishment. Tribal wars included looting, destruction of houses and canoes and killing of prisoners. Pre-Spanish population estimates are deemed unreliable.

=== Earliest European contacts ===
Pohnpei's first European visitor was Spanish navigator Álvaro de Saavedra Cerón on 14 September 1529 shortly before his death, when trying to find the way back to New Spain. He charted it as San Bartolomé and called this one and the surrounding islands as Los Pintados (literally, "the painted ones" in Spanish) because the natives were frequently tattooed. It was later visited by the navigator Pedro Fernandes de Queirós, commanding the Spanish ship San Jeronimo. on 23 December 1595; his description is brief, he made no attempt to land.

=== 19th-century visitors ===
There is good documentation about Australian sailor John Henry Rowe, who arrived in his barque John Bull on 10 September 1825, though he did not land as his vessel was chased off by native canoes. The first lengthy description of the island and its inhabitants is presented by the Russian explorer Fyodor Litke, whose ship Senyavin gave the island group of Pohnpei, Ant and Pakin its name. From 14 to 19 January 1828, his boats attempted to land but could not due to the hostility shown by the islanders, but natives then came aboard his ship, "some trading occurred, a short vocabulary was compiled, and a map made." F.H. von Kittlitz, a member of the Litke expedition made a further descriptive account, including the offshore ruins of Nan Madol, and the two reports together provided the first real knowledge of Pohnpei. It is not clear who the next visitors were; however, when Capt. J.H. Eagleston of the barque Peru sighted the island on 3 January 1832, it was already on his charts as "Ascension Island". Riesenberg writes that it is uncertain who first called it Ascension Island, but the name became established until the Spanish period.

=== Missionaries and other visitors ===
From this time onward, whaling and trading vessels came in increasing numbers. Very soon a "large colony of beachcombers, escaped convicts, and ship's deserters became established ashore," identified as "chiefly bad characters", according to the log of the Swedish frigate Eugenie. The first missionary to arrive was Father Louis Désiré Maigret, a Roman Catholic priest. He had sailed from Honolulu on the schooner Notre Dame de Paix and began his efforts in December 1837, but he departed on 29 July 1838 for Valparaíso after seven unsuccessful months. In his company were "several Mangarevans and Tahitians", some of whom remained on Pohnpei and left descendants. Ten years later Maigret returned to the Hawaiian Kingdom as Bishop of Honolulu. A group of Protestant missionaries from New England established themselves permanently on Pohnpei in 1852. Their letters and journals contain a wealth of information about the island and are preserved at Harvard University.

A drastic population decline occurred after 1854, due to a smallpox epidemic.

During the American Civil War, to counteract the Union Navy blockade of their ports, Confederate States Navy ships hunted Yankee merchant shipping. On 1 April 1865, the CSS Shenandoah surprised four United States whalers at Ascension Island (Pohnpei) and destroyed them all. The local king, Nananierikie, was delighted to receive much of the spoils from this action.

In 1880, the German naturalist Otto Fischer wrote an ethnographic account of the inhabitants of the island.

=== Spanish rule ===
By 1886 the Spaniards claimed the Caroline Islands which were part of the Manila-based Spanish East Indies and began to exert political authority. They founded the city Santiago de la Ascensión in what today is Kolonia (from Spanish colonia or colony). The Spanish built several government buildings, a fort, a church and a school. Spanish Capuchin friars were also sent from Manila to Pohnpei to preach the Catholic faith. After the 1898 Spanish–American War, the German Empire purchased the Caroline Islands from Spain in 1899 together with the Mariana Islands (except Guam) and four years later the Marshall Islands for 17 million goldmark.

=== German rule and land reform ===
During the German administration a fundamental change in land ownership was implemented on Pohnpei and throughout the Carolines. Beginning in 1907, the feudal system, in which all land is held in fief, was gradually replaced with the issuance of individual deeds to land. The chief's economic advantages were thus reduced, and only force of tradition granted a first harvest tribute to chiefs.

With land holding, taxes came due and new owners, in lieu of payment, were obliged to work 15 days per year on public projects, such as wharf construction, road building, etc. One such work for taxes engagement sparked the Sokehs rebellion. It began as an insubordination event during road construction on Sokehs Island, then escalated into the murder of nine people, the subsequent apprehension and trial of 36 Sokehs rebels, the execution of 15 insurgents, and banishment for others to Babelthuap in the German Palau Islands.

The German census of 1911–12 shows 3,190 Pohnpeians, 585 Central Carolinians and 279 Melanesians. Many of the outer islands were resettled (mainly on Sokehs Island) as a consequence of destructive typhoons in their home islands.

A special census conducted in late 1947 shows a total population of 5,628, of which 4,451 were Pohnpeians, and 1,177 were natives of other Pacific islands. By 1963, the population had grown to nearly 10,000.

=== Japanese rule ===
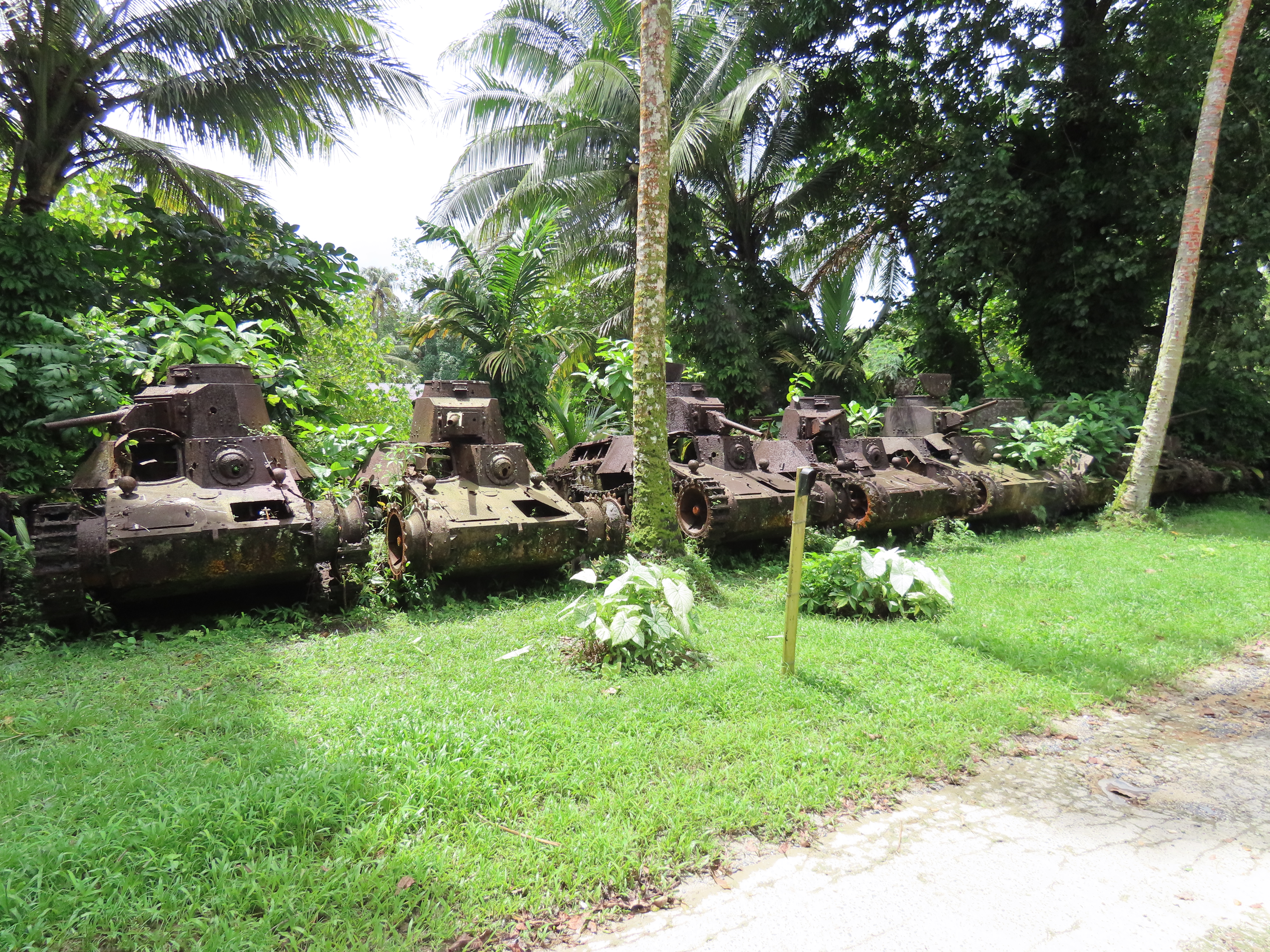
Relics of WW2, derelict tanks

With the Treaty of Versailles, Japan as mandatory power assumed control of all German colonial possessions north of the equator, having occupied Pohnpei along with the rest of the Carolines, the Marshalls, the Marianas (except for American-owned Guam) and Kiautschou Bay during World War I. In subsequent years and during World War II the Japanese garrison strength was composed of about 2,000 men of the IJN under Captain Jun Naito and 5,984 IJA men under Lieutenant General Masao Watanabe. However, Pohnpei was bypassed by the United States Navy during the island-hopping amphibious campaigns of 1943–1945.

The island was shelled on several occasions, including by the battleships USS Massachusetts, USS Alabama, and USS Iowa, as well as air attacks launched from USS Cowpens. Japan surrendered in 1945, and the Pohnpei was turned over to the United States without a battle. After the war, Japanese nationals were repatriated to Japan by the US Navy. The people on Pohnpei would be in a United Nations trusteeship to determine their own fate.

=== United States administration, under United Nations oversight ===
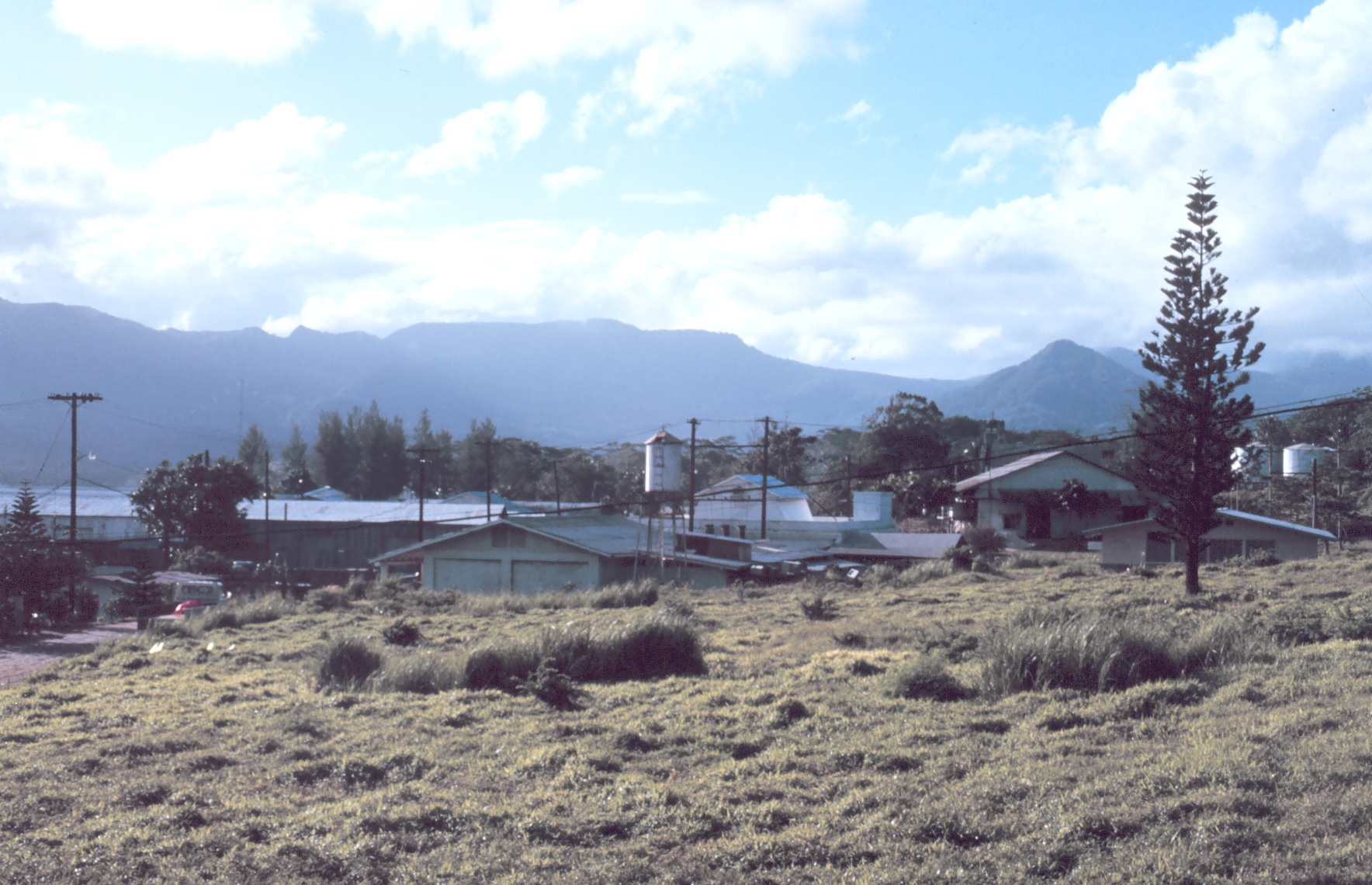
District center of Pohnpei Circa 1971

The Federated States of Micronesia achieved independence in 1986 after being administered by the United States under UN auspices since 1947 as part of the Trust Territory of the Pacific Islands. Pohnpei is an island part of Federated States of Micronesia, which is recognized by the United Nations. It has maintained a defense and aid agreement with the United States after becoming independent.

== Geography ==
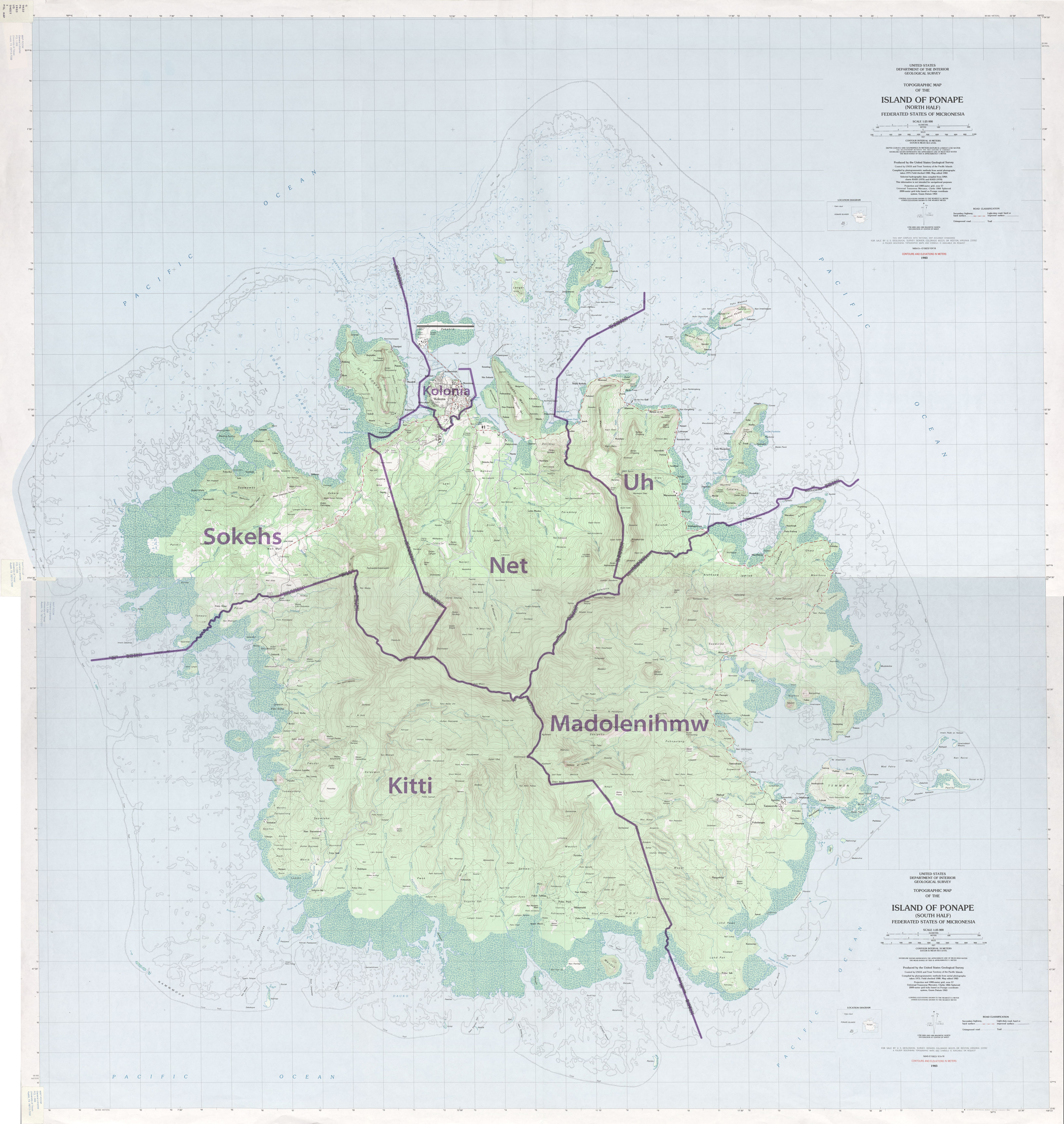
Detailed map of Pohnpei, showing the borders of the five 'independent tribes'

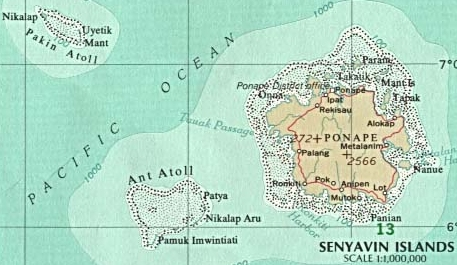
Senyavin Islands (Pohnpei plus two neighboring atolls)

The highest point of the island is Mount Nanlaud at 772 or 782 metres. Pohnpei is home to several dozen bird species including four endemic species, the Pohnpei lorikeet, the Pohnpei fantail, the Pohnpei flycatcher and the long-billed white-eye. A fifth endemic, the Pohnpei starling, is thought to have recently gone extinct.

The only land reptiles are a few species of lizard. Originally the only mammals were bats. Pigs, rats and dogs were introduced; pigs have become feral. The lagoons are rich in fish, molluscs, turtles and other marine fauna.

=== Climate ===
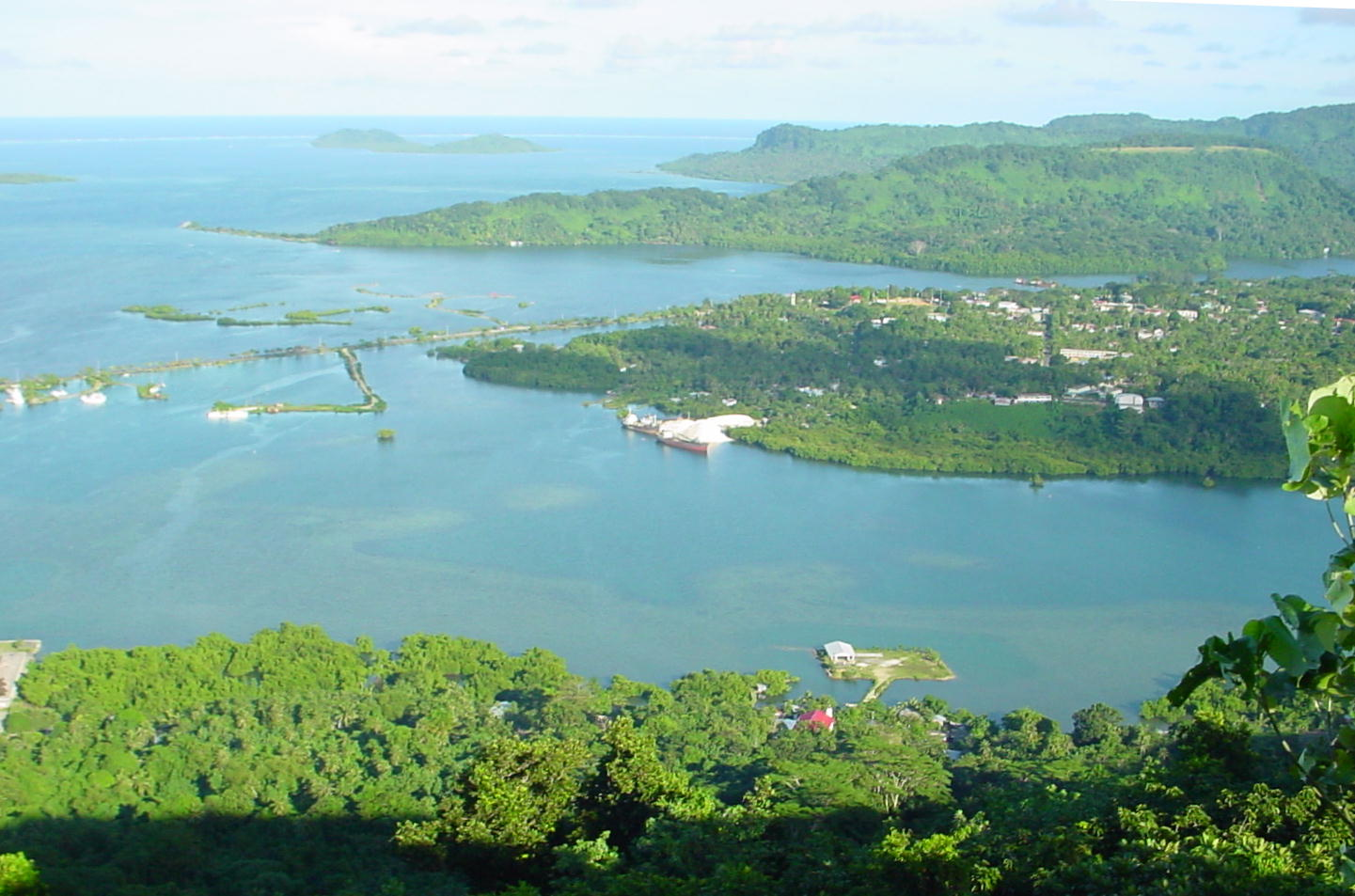
Kolonia Town looking down from Sokehs Ridge

Pohnpei belongs to the tropical rainforest climate zone (Köppen: Af). It is one of the wettest places on Earth with an average annual recorded rainfall of 4,775 mm (188.0 in) in towns along the coast and about 7,600 mm (300 in) each year in certain mountainous locations.

Climate data for Pohnpei
Month	Jan	Feb	Mar	Apr	May	Jun	Jul	Aug	Sep	Oct	Nov	Dec	Year
Mean daily maximum °C (°F)	30 (86)	30 (86)	30 (86)	30 (86)	30 (86)	30 (86)	30 (86)	31 (87)	31 (87)	31 (87)	31 (87)	30 (86)	30 (86)
Mean daily minimum °C (°F)	23 (73)	24 (75)	24 (75)	23 (73)	23 (73)	23 (73)	22 (71)	22 (71)	22 (71)	22 (71)	23 (73)	23 (73)	22 (71)
Average precipitation mm (inches)	310 (12.1)	260 (10.2)	360 (14)	450 (17.6)	490 (19.4)	420 (16.6)	440 (17.2)	410 (16.3)	400 (15.9)	410 (16.2)	400 (15.9)	420 (16.7)	4,770 (187.8)
Source: Weatherbase

== Demographics ==
The population of the state in 2010 was approximately 36,196. While the majority of the population consider themselves ethnic Pohnpeians, Pohnpei is more ethnically diverse than any other island in the FSM. This is largely due to more than a century of foreign colonial occupation, bringing in Spanish, German, Japanese, Chamorro, Filipino, US, Australian, other western Europeans, and it being home to the capital of the national government, which employs hundreds of people from the other three FSM States (Yap, Chuuk, Kosrae) having distinct ethnic and cultural origins. The indigenous makeup also includes the multiple regional ethnicities of the outer islands within Pohnpei State, resulting in a mix of Australasian Pacific Islanders and hence making Pohnpei Island the FSM's melting pot.

=== Languages ===
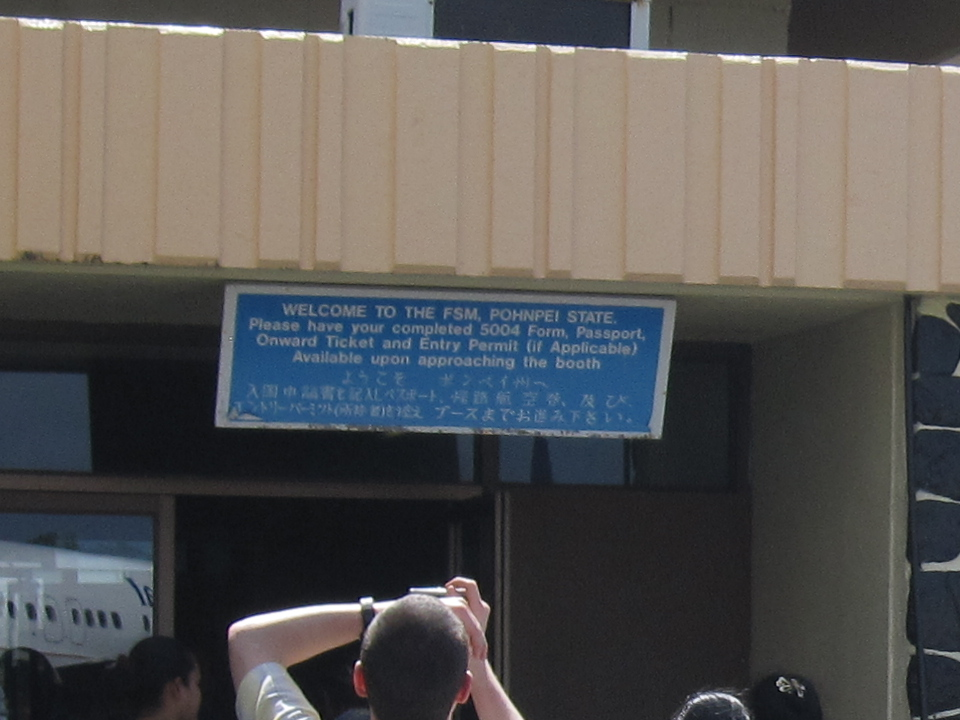
Sign for travelers at Pohnpei International Airport in official English and in Japanese.

The Pohnpeian language (formerly called "Ponapean") and its dialects are the indigenous languages of Pohnpei. The Federated States of Micronesia government also uses Pohnpeian as a regional language. English and Spanish are spoken in the island.

== Administrative divisions ==
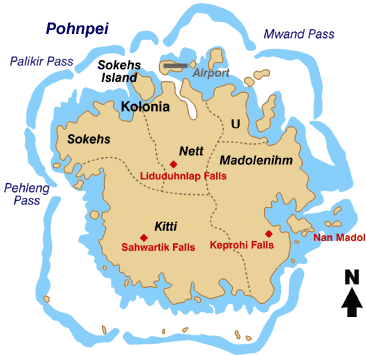
Municipality map of Pohnpei

The municipalities on the island of Pohnpei are:

- Kitti, southwest. Includes Ant Atoll
- Kolonia, north
- Madolenihmw, east
- Nett (main island, north/center, formerly including state capital Kolonia on the north coast)
- Sokehs, northwest. Also includes Pakin Atoll and Palikir, the national capital
- U, northeast

== Transportation ==
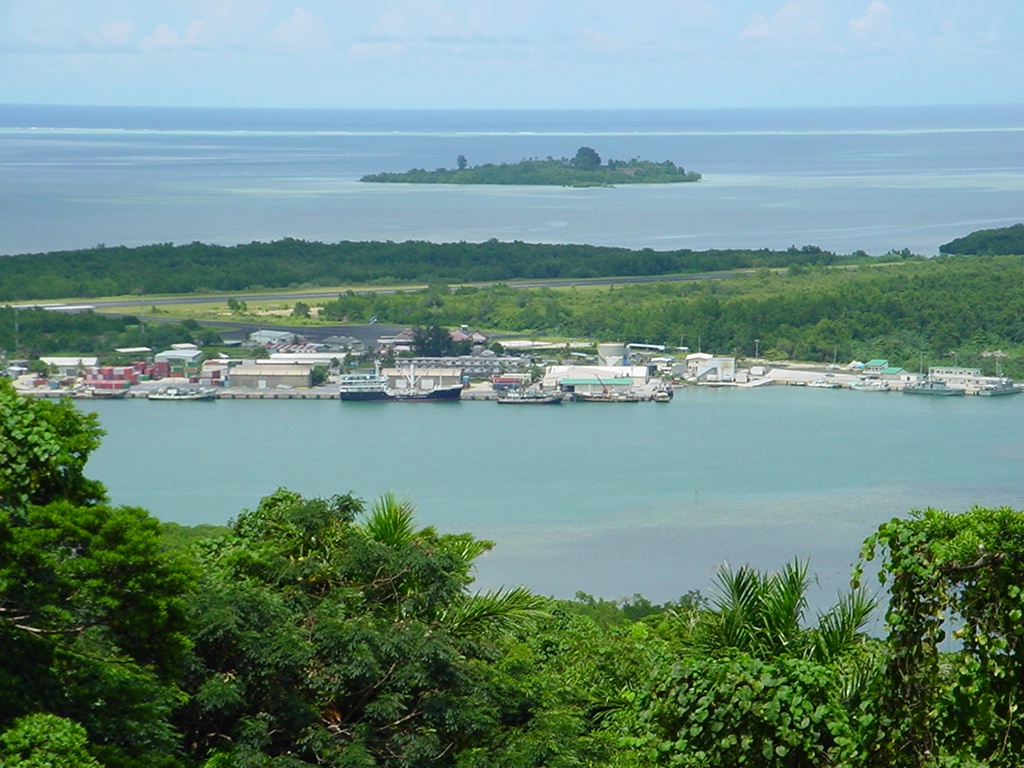
Pohnpei International Airport Runway and Pohnpei Seaport viewed from Sokehs Ridge

Pohnpei International Airport (IATA code PNI) is located near Kolonia, on a small island named Deketik off the northern coast of the main island.

== Sport ==
The FSM is part of the international Olympic movement, originally the work of James Tobin, who now sits on the IOC Executive Board, sending teams to the summer games beginning in 2000 with the Sydney games and continuing every four years to the present with athletes participating in track and field, swimming and weightlifting. The most notable Pohnpeian athlete is marathon runner Elias Rodriguez who ran for the FSM at the Sydney Olympics. Rodriguez finished last in the marathon but was cheered on by tens of thousands of spectators and watched by millions of television viewers as he entered the Olympic stadium for a final lap immediately prior to the closing ceremony which was delayed to allow his finish.

Pohnpei's state football team were coached by the world's youngest national football coach, the Englishman Paul Watson, who led the team on a tour of nearby Guam, winning one match against a local team. The annual Micronesian Futsal Cup has been established on the island, also the work of Watson.

== Pohnpei in fiction ==
Pohnpei (as Ponape) plays a role in several stories of the Cthulhu Mythos by H. P. Lovecraft and others. Its role in "Out of the Aeons", by Lovecraft and Hazel Heald, was inspired by the ruins of Nan Madol (see above), which had already been used as the setting for a lost race story by Abraham Merritt, The Moon Pool, in which the islands are called Nan-Matal. (Note: "they had set forth for the Nan-Matal, that extraordinary group of island ruins clustered along the eastern shore of Ponape in the Carolines")

Pohnpei is a central location in South Sea Adventure (1952), the second of Willard Price's Young Adult Adventure Series books featuring Hal and Roger Hunt.

Pohnpei, or "Ponape" as it is spelled, is stated as the home island of "Mike" on the popular blog Dunce Upon A Time, authored by BC Woods.

== Education ==
Pohnpei State Department of Education operates public schools.

Public high schools:

- Nanpei Memorial High School a.k.a. Kitti High School
- Madolenihmw High School
- Pohnpei Island Central School (former Pacific Island Central School) in Nett

Private schools:

- Calvary Christian Academy in Kolonia
- Ohwa Christian High School in Madolenihmw
- Our Lady of Mercy Catholic High School in Kolonia
- Seventh Day Adventist High School in Nett

Pohnpei Catholic School

Post secondary education:

- College of Micronesia-FSM, which has a state campus in each of the four states with its national campus in the capital city of Palikir. The COM-FSM system also includes the Fisheries and Maritime Institute (FMI) on the Yap islands.

Lidorkini Museum was located in Kolonia, until its closure in 2012.

== Notable residents ==
- Debra Daniel – Olympic swimmer
- Iris Falcam – Librarian and former First Lady of Micronesia
- Leo Falcam – Former President of Micronesia
- Kerson Hadley – Olympic swimmer
- Emelihter Kihleng – Poet
- Bailey Olter – Former President of Micronesia
- Elias Rodriguez – Olympic marathon runner
- Mihter Wendolin – Olympic sprinter

== Gallery ==
Flag of Pohnpei

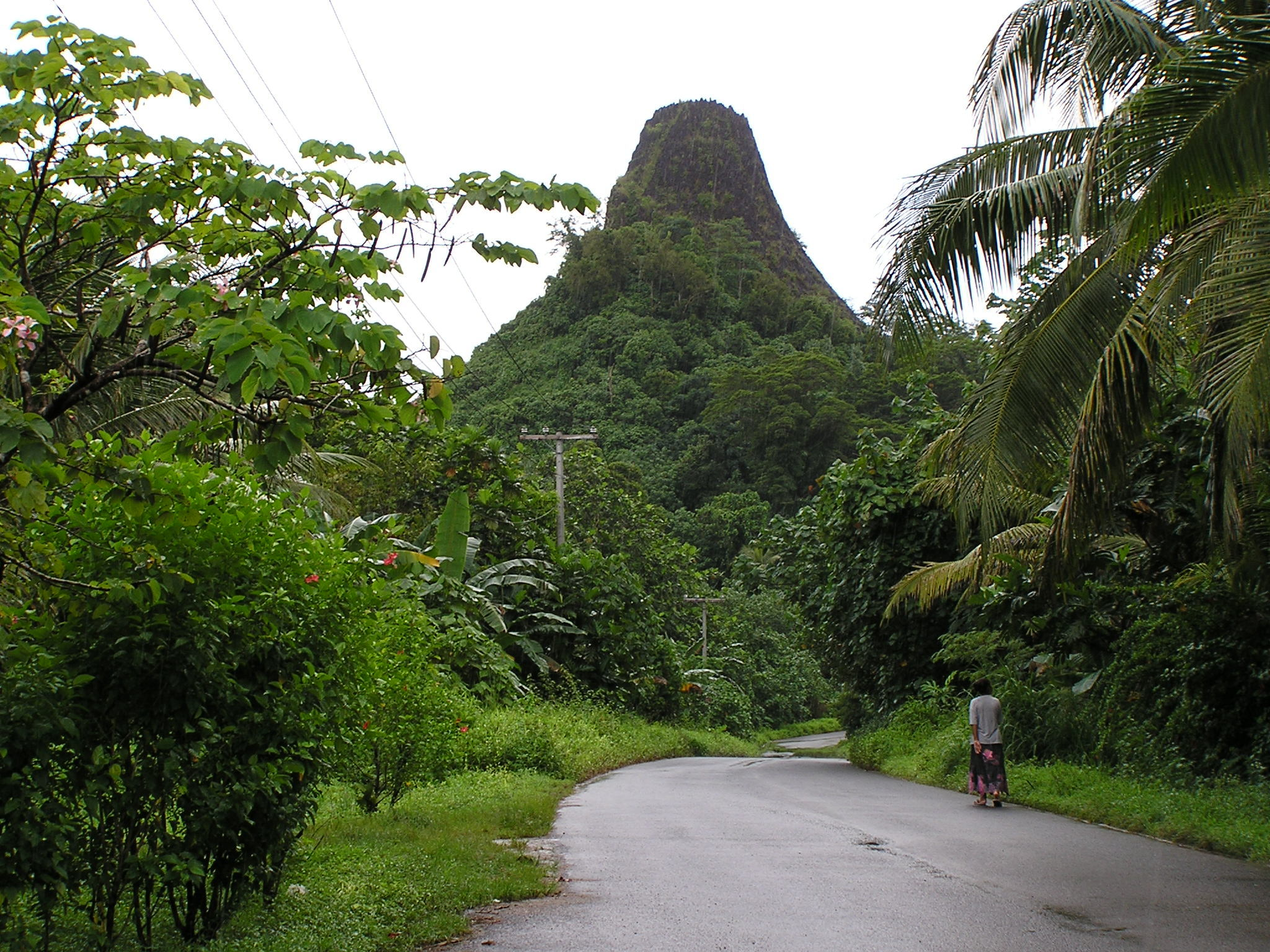
Pwusehn Malek (also known as Chickenshit Mountain) in Pohnpei

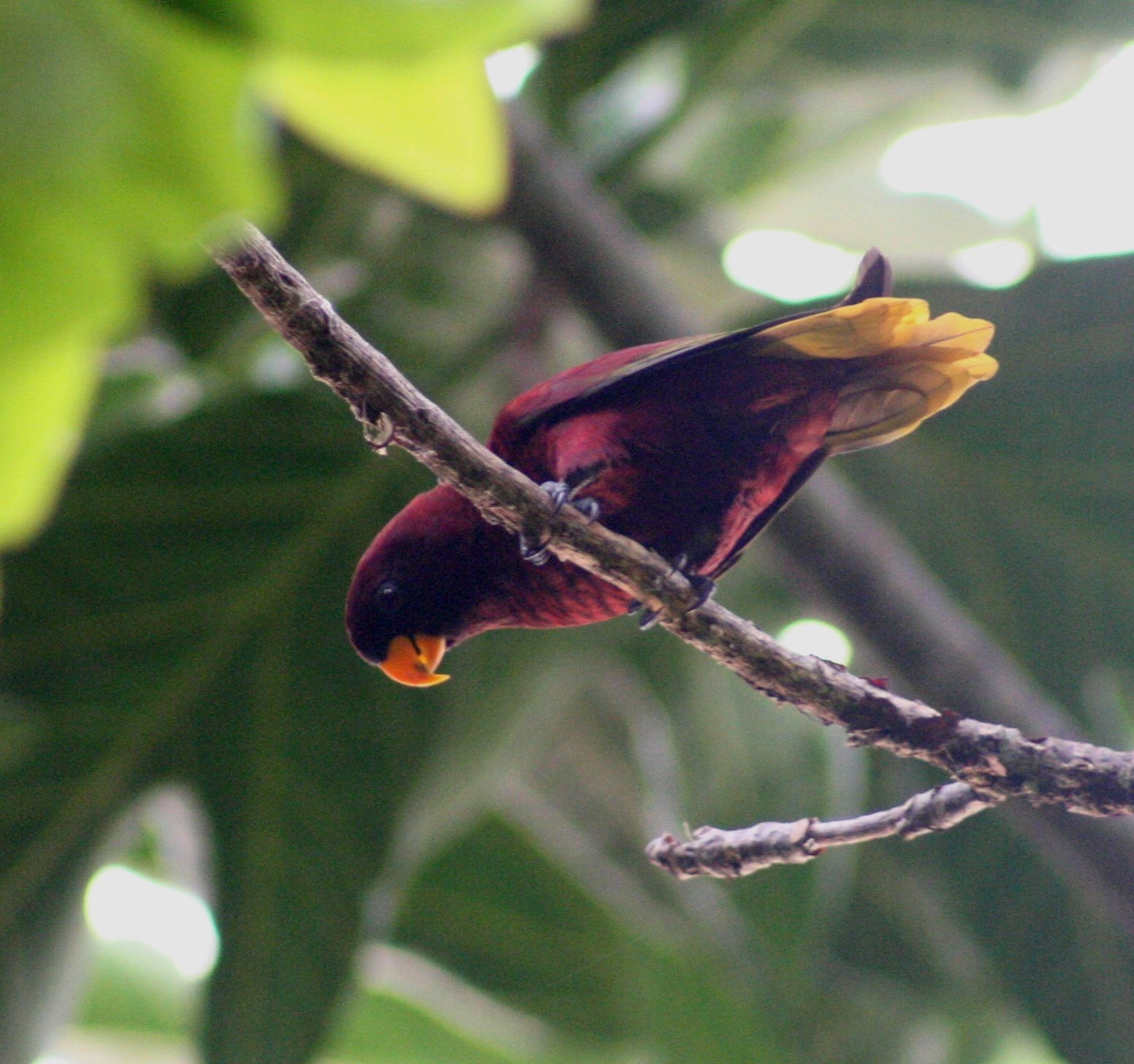
Pohnpei lorikeet

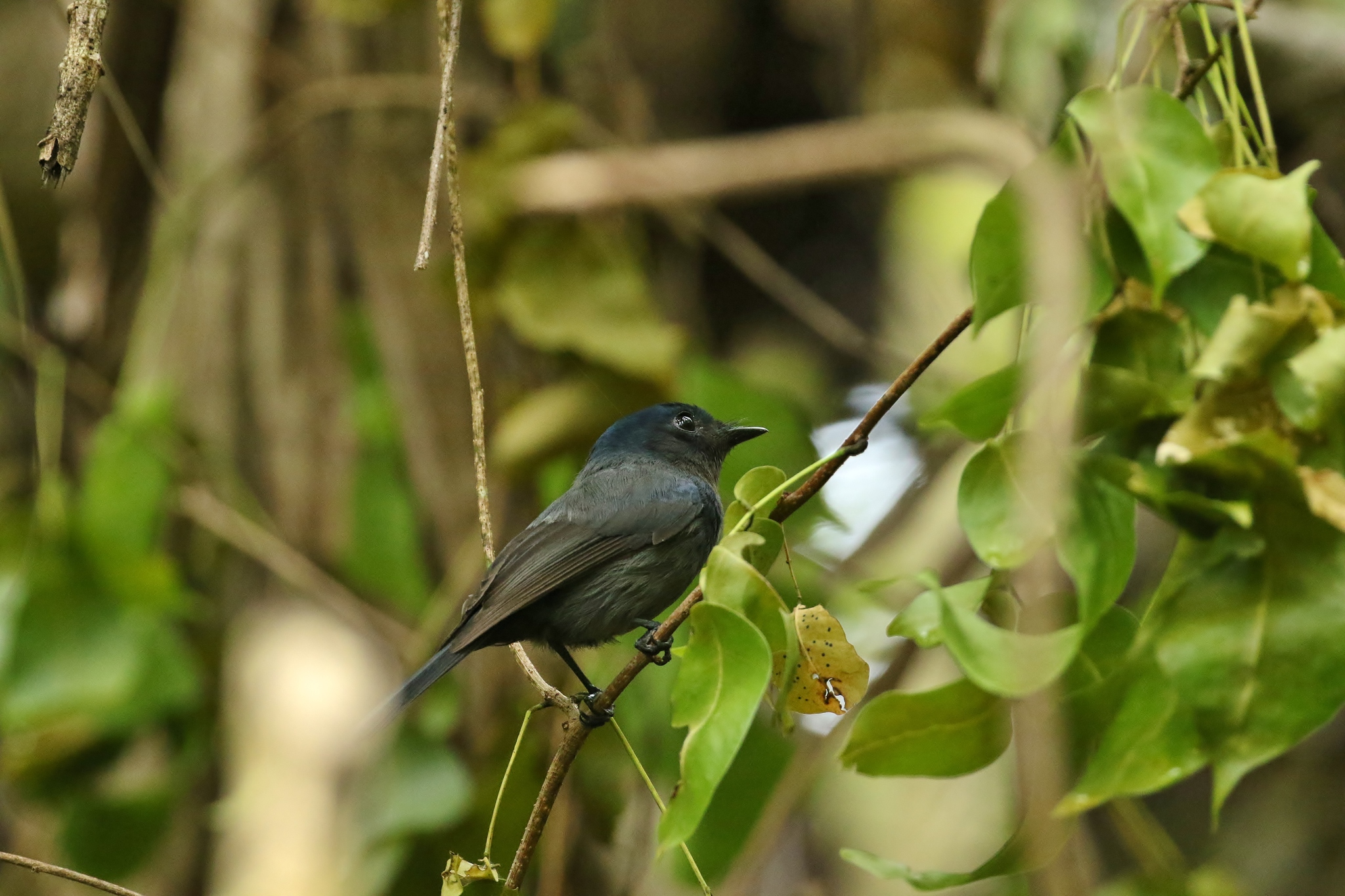
Pohnpei flycatcher

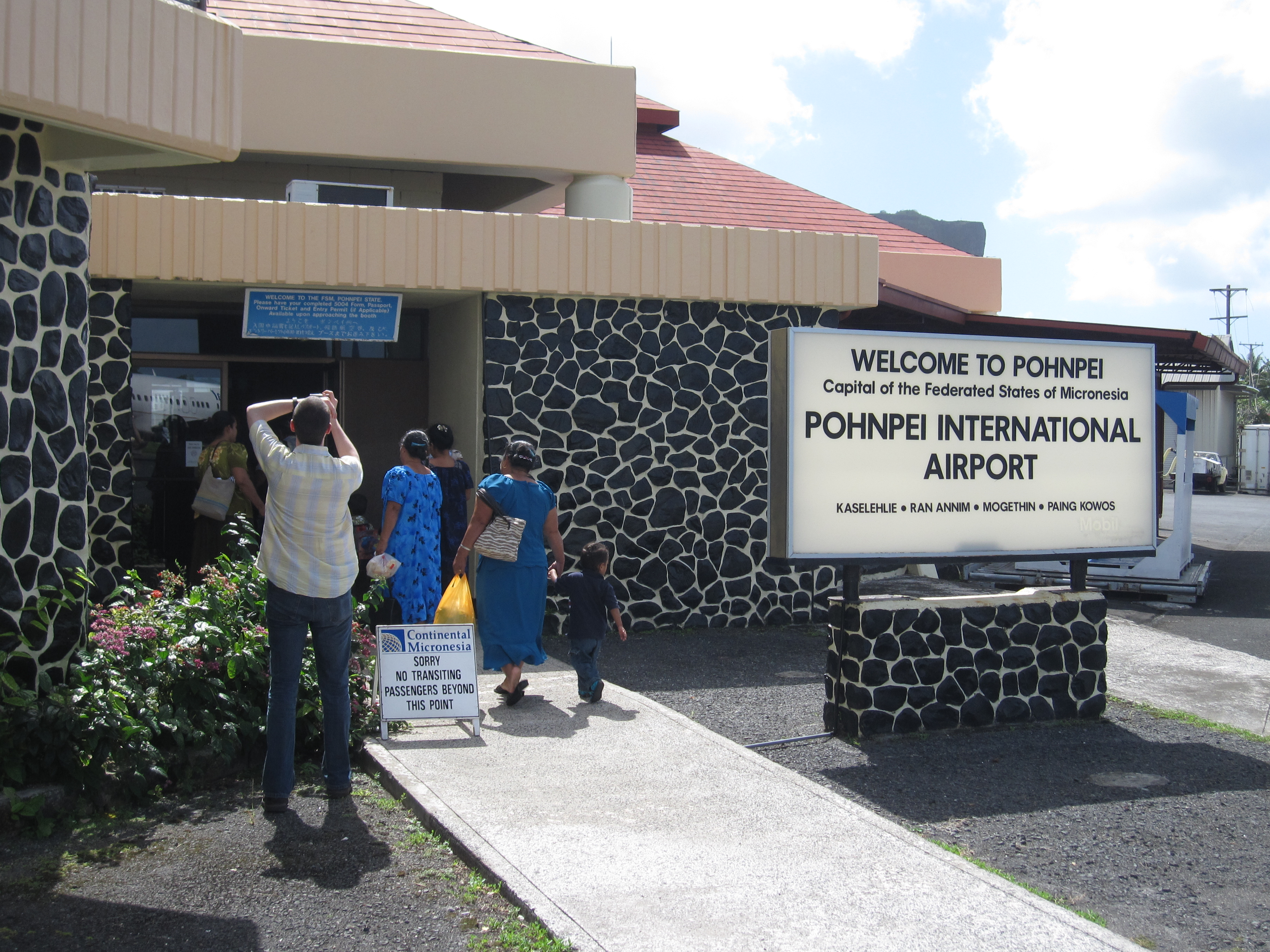
Pohnpei Airport

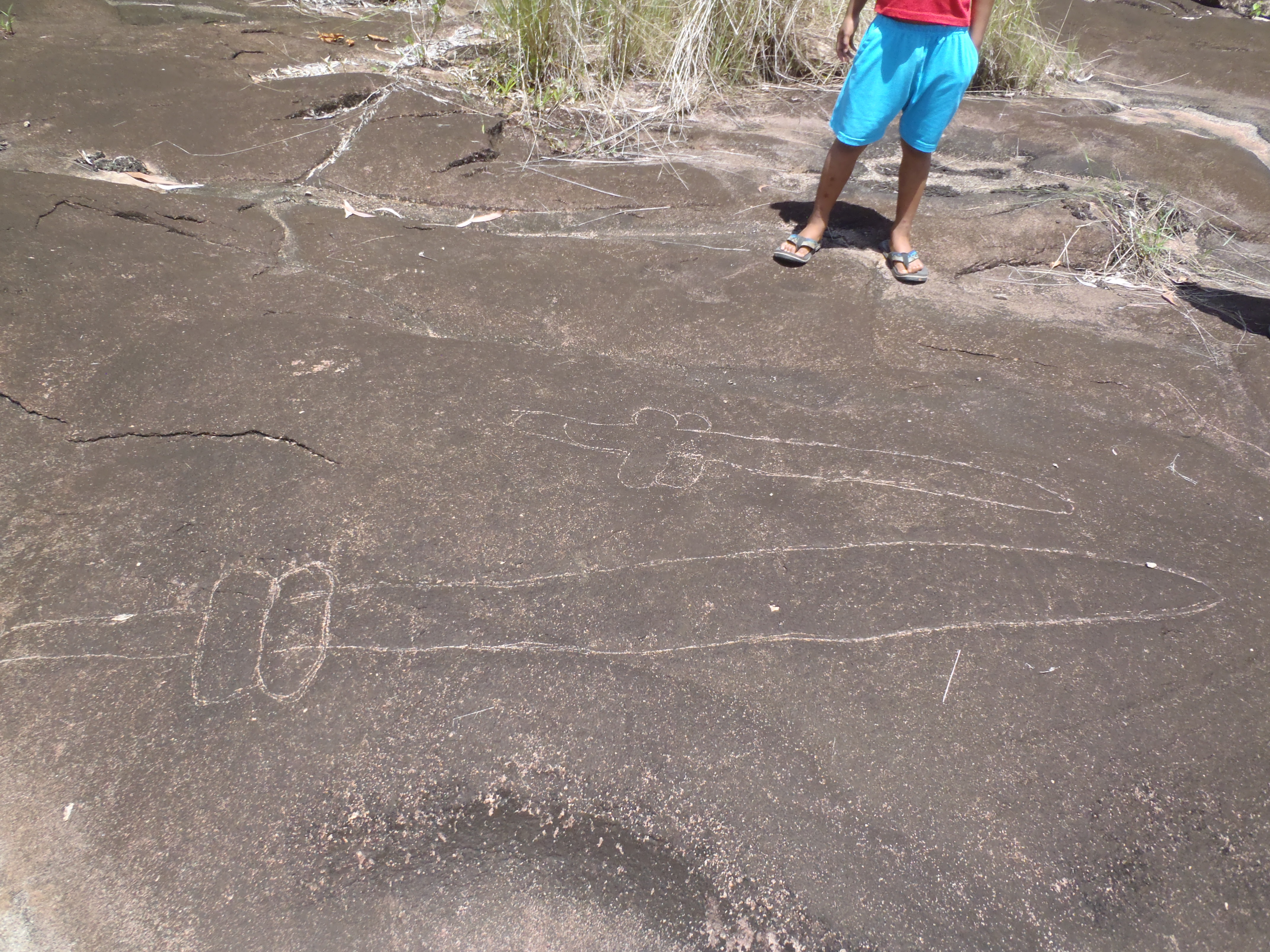
Petroglyphs

== See also ==
- Kapingamarangi
- Nan Madol
- Nukuoro
- Oroluk
- Pingelap
- Sapwuahfik
- US Naval Base Carolines
