= Telecommunications in the Federated States of Micronesia =

This article is about communications systems in the Federated States of Micronesia.

In 2010, Pohnpei State was connected to the Internet using the HANTRU-1 undersea communications cable to provide high-speed bandwidth. Kosrae State, Chuuk State, and Yap State, were planned to be connected in a second phase.

== Telephone ==
Main lines in use: 8,000 (1995)

Mobile cellular: NA

Telephone system:
domestic: islands interconnected by shortwave radiotelephone (used mostly for government purposes)
international: satellite earth stations - 4 Intelsat (Pacific Ocean)

== Radio ==
Broadcast stations: AM 5, FM 1, shortwave 1 (2011)

Stations below are included in the total: AM Radio stations:

- AM 999 V6AF - (Pohnpei)
- AM 1350 V6A - Baptist Radio - Moen (Chuuk) FM.. religious-Baptist
- AM 1449 V6AH - Radio V6AH - Kolonia (Pohnpei) FM.. religious-Christian
- AM 1494 V6AI - Radio Yap - Colonia, Yap (Yap)
- AM 1503 V6AJ - Voice of Kosrae - Tofol (Kosrae) FM.. English, Kosraean
- AM 1593 V6AK - Moen (Chuuk)..

FM Radio stations:

- FM 88.1 V6BC (Truk)
- FM 88.1 V6AI-FM (Moen)
- FM 88.5 V6MA-FM
- FM 88.5 V6MA Bible Baptist Church Radio (Weno, Chuuk)
- FM 88.9 V6JY (Yap)
- FM 88.9 V6KIZ (Pohnpei)
- FM 89.5 V6W-1
- FM 89.5 V6CWS
- FM 89.7 V6AA (Yap)
- FM 89.7 V6AJ (Kosrae)
- FM 101.1 V6AV (BBC World Service) (Yap)
- FM 104.1 V6AF-FM - Kolonia (Pohnpei) FM.. religious-Christian

There is also a shortwave relay of 88.5 FM at 4755 kHz, V6MP.

Radios: NA

== Television ==
Broadcast stations:

- KPON 7 Kolonia (Pohnpei, 1 kW)
- TTKK 7 Moen (Truk, 0.1 kW)
- WAAB 7 (Government station) Colonia (Yap, 1 kW) - (1997)

Several Honolulu local stations are available on cable (converted from ATSC to DVB-T): KHET (PBS), KHON-TV (Fox), KITV-TV (ABC), KHNL-TV (NBC) and KGMB-TV (CBS).

Televisions: NA

== Internet ==
Internet service providers (ISPs):

- FSMTC
- iBoom
- iSolutions Micronesia LTD
- Starlink Pacific Islands
- Kacific Broadband Satellite Group

1

Country code: .fm
