= Telephone numbers in the Federated States of Micronesia =

Telephone numbers in Federated States of Micronesia
- Country: Federated States of Micronesia
- Continent: Oceania
- NSN length: 7
- Format: +691 yyy xxxx
- Country code: +691
- International access: 011

Telephone numbers in the Federated States of Micronesia use the country calling code +691 and have seven-digit national significant numbers; the international call prefix is 011. Telephone numbers are allocated by state. Number ranges introduced after 2003 use prefixes beginning with 92 for Pohnpei, 93–94 for Chuuk, 95–96 for Yap, and 97 for Kosrae; the Pohnpei, Chuuk, and Yap ranges are used for both fixed and mobile services, while the listed Kosrae range is for mobile service. These replaced earlier ranges beginning with 320, 330, 350, and 370 for the four states, respectively.

== Dialing codes and prefixes ==
Country Code: +691
International Call Prefix: 011

National Significant Numbers (NSN): seven-digits

Format: +691 yyy xxxx

== Areas in the Federated States of Micronesia ==
The number ranges before 2003 were:

LIST OF AREA CODES
Number range	Locality	Service
320 1000 to 320 9999	Pohnpei	
330 1000 to 330 9999	Chuuk	
350 1000 to 350 9999	Yap	
370 1000 to 370 9999	Kosrae	

The new number ranges after 2003 are:

LIST OF AREA CODES
Number range	Locality	Service
920 1000 to 929 9999	Pohnpei and Pohnpei outer island	fixed and mobile
930 1000 to 949 9999	Chuuk and Chuuk outer island	fixed and mobile
950 1000 to 969 9999	Yap and Yap outer island	fixed and mobile
970 1000 to 979 9999	Kosrae	mobile

== See also ==
- Telecommunications in the Federated States of Micronesia
