= TTKK =

Television station in Micronesia

Weno, Chuuk; Federated States of Micronesia
- Channels: Analog: 7 (VHF)

History
- First air date: 1980
- Former call signs: WTKK-TV

Technical information
- ERP: 0.1 kW

TTKK (channel 7) is a television station in Weno (formerly Moen), Chuuk State. The station is one of the two commercial operations in the Federated States of Micronesia.

It started operations in 1980 as "WTKK-TV" (no relation to the station in Washington, D.C., that held the same call sign at the time), becoming the third television station in the Federated States of Micronesia; however, the station entered bankruptcy about a year and a half after signing on. Moreover, the station faced technical difficulties on a regular basis. Programming was provided by the Pacific Taping Company, which also taped content for WAAB-TV in Yap to air. Upon the shutdown of the initial service, VCRs surpassed conventional television in Chuuk.

There was another service operating for an eighteen-month period from late 1975 to early 1977 that closed due to a reported lack of income.

It is unknown exactly when the station resumed its operations; as early as 1990, the station was already listed in guide books under the current TTKK call sign. Other sources say that Chuuk lacked television by 1993, but instead resorted to videotaped American programming.
