= List of World Heritage Sites in the Federated States of Micronesia =

Location of World Heritage Sites in Federated States of Micronesia

The United Nations Educational, Scientific and Cultural Organization (UNESCO) designates World Heritage Sites of outstanding universal value to cultural or natural heritage which have been nominated by countries which are signatories to the UNESCO World Heritage Convention, established in 1972. Cultural heritage consists of monuments (such as architectural works, monumental sculptures, or inscriptions), groups of buildings, and sites (including archaeological sites). Natural features (consisting of physical and biological formations), geological and physiographical formations (including habitats of threatened species of animals and plants), and natural sites which are important from the point of view of science, conservation or natural beauty, are defined as natural heritage. The Federated States of Micronesia accepted the convention on July 22, 2002, making its historical sites eligible for inclusion on the list. As of 2023, the Federated States of Micronesia has only one World Heritage Site.

== World Heritage Sites ==
UNESCO lists sites under ten criteria; each entry must meet at least one of the criteria. Criteria i through vi are cultural, and vii through x are natural.

† In danger

World Heritage Sites
Site	Image	Location (state)	Year listed	UNESCO data	Description
Nan Madol: Ceremonial Centre of Eastern Micronesia†	The ruins of Nan Madol on Pohnpei island	Pohnpei	2016	1503; i, iii, iv, vi (cultural)	Nan Madol is a series of more than 100 islets off the south-east coast of Pohnpei that were constructed with walls of basalt and coral boulders. These islets harbour the remains of stone palaces, temples, tombs and residential domains built between 1200 and 1500 CE. These ruins represent the ceremonial centre of the Saudeleur dynasty, a vibrant period in Pacific Island culture. The huge scale of the edifices, their technical sophistication and the concentration of megalithic structures bear testimony to complex social and religious practices of the island societies of the period. The site was also inscribed on the List of World Heritage in Danger due to threats, notably the siltation of waterways that is contributing to the unchecked growth of mangroves and undermining existing edifices.

== Tentative list ==
In addition to sites inscribed on the World Heritage List, member states can maintain a list of tentative sites that they may consider for nomination. Nominations for the World Heritage List are only accepted if the site was previously listed on the tentative list. As of 2025, Micronesia has listed one property on its tentative list.

Tentative sites
Site	Image	Location (state)	Year listed	UNESCO criteria	Description
Yapese Disk Money Regional Sites	A rai stone near the village of Gachpar in Yap state	Yap	2004	i, ii, iii, iv (cultural)	
