= KPON-TV =

Kolonia, Pohnpei; Federated States of Micronesia
- Channels: Analog: 7 (VHF)

Ownership
- Owner: Central Micronesia Communications

History
- First air date: July 1977
- Call sign meaning: Pohnpei

Technical information
- ERP: 1 kW

KPON-TV (channel 7) is a television station broadcasting from Kolonia, capital of Pohnpei State, in the Federated States of Micronesia. The station is a commercial operation.

== History ==
KPON-TV started broadcasting in the first week of July 1977, founded by Bernard Helgenberger. The station first went on the air on a test basis, which would only become regular if the license was sent from the headquarters in Saipan, which Helgenberger was bound to receive by the end of the month. The station initially had no name, and adopted the KPON callsign after starting regular broadcasts. The headquarters were located in the former jailhouse in Kolonia's District Center.

When the station went on air, the operating hours were 3 to 11 p.m. Mondays to Saturdays and 10 a.m. to 11 p.m. Sundays. The station was scrambled, with a US$15 fee paid for a monthly subscription. Notable programming included Hawaii Five-O, Sesame Street, All in the Family, The Electric Company, movies and other programs from the three commercial networks (ABC, CBS, NBC) and some from PBS.

Its signal was clearly receivable in Kolonia, the state capital, one side of Sokehs and one side of Net Municipality. Growth of the reception was hampered by mountains, which disabled the station from expanding towards outlying municipalities. Local programming was scheduled for 1978, when the station was about to receive its own equipment. With that, the station would enable the carriage of special sessions of the Congress of Micronesia and local sports events. There was also a plan for a local news program, with Helgenberger receiving requests from people who wanted to be "Ponape's first Walter Cronkite". At launch, it became the seventh television station to sign on in the Trust Territory of the Pacific Islands.

The goal set by Television Ponape (whose parent company was Bernard's Enterprises) was to reach the 167 subscriber benchmark in order to reach the break-even point, which KPON wanted to achieve within its first year of operation. Weeks upon its launch, KPON had received 60 subscriptions. There were 100 television sets available for purchase upon launch, 80 in color and 20 in black and white. At first, all of the 21-inch color sets were sold, while others would bring their own sets, mostly used, from other areas in the Trust Territory, especially Saipan. In its early years, KPON-TV did not sell advertising, being treated as a cable television station for retransmission purposes.

The launch of the station affected attendance figures in movie theaters. Helgenberger owned one before 1977, which he later converted to a warehouse. Attendance fell 50% in the Marshall Islands and in Saipan.

KPON-TV lost its monopoly in 1989, when a cable company, TV Pohnpei, Inc., started broadcasting in June that year, providing a four-channel service with taped ABC, CBS, NBC and Fox programming. Helgenberger also owned the cable company until his death in 2001; the cable company is now owned by FSMTC. By the early 1990s, the station was sold to Central Micronesia Communications.
