= 1978 Trust Territory of the Pacific Islands constitutional referendum =

A referendum on the proposed constitution of the Federated States of Micronesia was held on 12 July 1978. It was approved in Chuuk, Kosrae, Pohnpei and Yap, who formed the Federation on 10 May the following year. In the Marshall Islands and Palau it was rejected, resulting in the islands becoming separate states.

== Results ==
Island(s)	For		Against		Invalid/ blank	Total	Registered voters	Turnout	Outcome
Island(s)	Votes	%	Votes	%	Invalid/ blank	Total	Registered voters	Turnout	Outcome
Chuuk	9,762	69.72	4,239	30.28	609	14,610	17,736	82.37	Approved
Kosrae	1,118	61.36	704	38.64		1,822	2,182		Approved
Marshall Islands	3,888	38.48	6,217	61.52	63	10,168	12,996	78.24	Rejected
Palau	2,720	44.89	3,339	55.11	114	6,173	6,500	94.97	Rejected
Pohnpei	5,970	74.72	2,020	25.28	518	8,508	11,177	76.12	Approved
Yap	3,359	94.75	186	5.25	83	3,628	4,650	78.02	Approved
Source: Horizons, Horizons, United Nations
