= .dj =

Top-level Internet domain for Djibouti

- Introduced: 22 May 1996
- TLD type: Country code top-level domain
- Status: Active
- Registry: dotDJ
- Sponsor: STID (Djibouti Telecom)
- Intended use: Entities connected with Djibouti
- Actual use: Marketed for music-related sites; gets some use for this as well as for Djibouti
- Registration restrictions: No restrictions on who can register; some names are reserved or subject to famous trademark owners having first registration rights
- Structure: Registrations are taken directly at second level
- Documents: Terms and conditions
- Dispute policies: Disputes can be negotiated via Association.DJ
- DNSSEC: No
- Registry website: dot.dj

.dj is the country code top-level domain (ccTLD) for Djibouti.

The domain has also been marketed as a domain hack for music-related sites due to the common use of "DJ" to mean disc jockey; examples include rave.dj, transitions.dj, and cord.dj.

== See also ==
- .am
- .cd
- .fm
- .me
- .mu
