= .fm =

Country-code top level domain of the Federated States of Micronesia

- Introduced: April 19, 1995; 31 years ago
- TLD type: Country code top-level domain
- Status: Active
- Registry: dotFM (BRS Media Inc.)
- Sponsor: FSM Telecommunications Corporation
- Intended use: Entities connected with the Federated States of Micronesia
- Actual use: Much use related to FM radio and podcasts; little related to the FSM
- Registration restrictions: None
- Structure: Registrations are available directly at second level
- Registry website: dot.fm

.fm is the country code top-level domain (ccTLD) for the Federated States of Micronesia, an independent island nation located in the Pacific Ocean.

== Registration ==
Except for reserved names like .com.fm, .net.fm, .org.fm and others, any person in the world can register a .fm domain for a fee, much of the income from which goes to the government and people of the islands.

On March 29, 2018, .fm began allowing registration of emoji domains.

== Domain hack ==
The domain name is popular (and thus economically valuable) for FM radio stations and streaming audio websites (other similar ccTLDs are .am, .tv, .cd, .dj and .mu); a notable example is Last.fm, a social music website.

== See also ==
- Internet in the Federated States of Micronesia
- Internet in the United States
- .us
