= WAAB-TV =

Colonia, Yap; Federated States of Micronesia
- Channels: Analog: 7 (VHF)

Ownership
- Owner: Yap State Government; (Yap State Media and Protocol)

History
- First air date: January 1979
- Call sign meaning: Wa'ab, one of the native names of Yap

Technical information
- ERP: 1 kW

WAAB-TV (also V6AM) is a television station in the state of Yap in the Federated States of Micronesia. Set up by an American company with support from the Yapese government in 1979, it is a terrestrial television station broadcasting on channel 7. The station is owned by Yap State Media and Protocol (formerly Yap State Government Media).

== History ==
"Hello, this is WAAB-TV going on air, broadcasting eight hours a day, with news on Tuesdays and Fridays, when it's nine hours. So get out your betel nut, relax in front of your television and enjoy yourselves."

— WAAB-TV's daily sign-on announcement in 1980

The local government set up the local television station in 1979 with no discussions over the implementation of the service, with one government director calling the setup a "quick maneuver", and a capitalization of US$80,000. In its first year, the station was struggling to operate.

The station signed on in January 1979 and initially broadcast from the facilities of WAAB radio before moving to its own facilities later on in the year. The service was not free-to-air, but scrambled. Subscribers paid a monthly fee of US$15 for a decoder to descramble the signal. The money collected from subscriptions would be used to pay for its expenses. The launch of WAAB-TV gave television to all districts of Micronesia except Truk and Kosrae. The station was housed in a small room with two Japanese VHS machines and a couple of television sets. The staff consisted of a former Yapese radio announcer who received the tapes upon arrival. The tapes received by WAAB-TV varied in length. Every two hours, a new cassette tape was inserted. The station was registered under American laws

Programming was taped from the U.S. state of California by the Los Angeles–based Pacific Taping Company and later sent to the island. The tapes included commercials for U.S. products not available on the island. Early in its existence, the station broadcast eight hours a day, except on Tuesdays and Fridays, where it broadcast nine hours a day, as the station broadcast the WAAB-TV News, presented by Elon Place and Willy Gorongfel. Gorongfel presented the segments in the Yapese language.

A five-member board (the WAAB Television Board) was appointed by Governor John Mangefel in 1980 to be in charge of the television system. Two of the members were known for their opposition to television. Commercials for subjects deemed taboo in local culture were left intact in the tapes due to a provision in the Copyright Law Revision of 1976 that forbade their removal. The station received tapes from Los Angeles stations under the grounds of "nonsimultaneous secondary transmission". The law also affected other television stations and cable companies in the FSM.

The operational costs of WAAB-TV and sister radio station WSZA were estimated to be at US$23,000 in 1983 and the recommended annual budget for 1984 was of US$17,000.

WAAB-TV planned an expansion of its video equipment as part of a federal five-year plan that started in 1985. The tapes received by WAAB-TV varied in length.

The station falls under the auspices of the Director of Youth and Civic Affairs. Attempts in the 1980s and 1990s at making WAAB-TV more self-sufficient have failed, causing the station to become the only one in Micronesia to fall under government control. A feasibility study was conducted in 1989 by the state government to improve the station and possibly convert it to a cable operation and operate more channels. The study was undertaken by Tom Hogan from Australia and Guam-based engineer William "Butch" McBride and was completed in February 1990.

As of 1993, WAAB-TV operated from 1:30 to 11:30 p.m. on weekdays and from noon to 11:30 p.m. on weekends. The schedule consisted of Sesame Street, sports and entertainment content, and a new news program had been created, Island Review. Tapes were flown in from COMTEL, a company from San Francisco, for a yearly fee of US$13,000, the tapes consisted of programs recorded on several over-the-air television stations in the area, and arrived to Yap on a two-to-four week delay. There were also plans to bring CNN and ESPN as well, but the plans were still fruitless.

In the 1990s, WAAB-TV operated from a single-story building shared with the radio station. Its basic editing room doubled as a studio for the fortnightly news program.

The station was profiled in the 1980 Australian-American documentary Yap... How Did You Know We'd Like TV?, produced by Dennis O'Rourke. The documentary was produced in association with WGBH in Boston and aired on select PBS stations in the United States.

In 2000, the Aries Report suggested a corporatization of the Yapese television system, with the possibility of cooperation from the FSM Telecommunications Corporation (FSMTC). By 2004, WAAB was still operating with precarious equipment and S-VHS tapes coming in from California, arriving on a one-month delay, and broadcasting from 1pm to 11:30pm. In April that year, Typhoon Sudal caused extensive damage to the station's infrastructure. It is unclear when the terrestrial television station resumed operations. In 2005, the FSMTC had set up its cable television network in the state of Yap, after having done so in other parts of the country. It was scheduled that the station would convert to a tapeless operation, without foreign aid, in the fiscal year of 2006. By 2008, the station was rebuilt, using the V6AM calls. Two staffs flew overseas to attend training for the editing of its news service.

The station is one of the broadcasting partners of The Pacific Way, a news magazine produced by the Pacific Community.
