= Federated States of Micronesia =

Island country in Oceania

- Flag Seal
- Motto: "Peace, Unity, Liberty"
- Anthem: "Patriots of Micronesia"
- Status: Sovereign state and UN member state under a Compact of Free Association with the United States (associated state)
- Capital: Palikir; 6°55′N 158°11′E
- Largest city: Weno
- Official language: English
- Recognized regional languages: Chuukese; Kosraean; Pohnpeian; Yapese
- Ethnic groups (2016): 48.8% Chuukese; 24.2% Pohnpeian; 6.2% Kosraean; 5.2% Yapese; 4.5% Outer Yapese; 1.8% Asian; 1.5% Polynesian; 6.4% other; 1.4% unknown
- Religion (2016): 95.3% Christianity; 52.6% Roman Catholic; 41.7% Protestant; 1.0% other Christian; 4.1% folk religions; 0.6% none / other
- Demonym: Micronesian
- Government: Federal assembly-independent republic under a non-partisan democracy
  - President: Wesley Simina
  - Vice President: Aren Palik
- Legislature: Congress

Independence from the United States
  - Republic proclaimed: May 10, 1979
  - Compact of Free Association: November 3, 1986

Area
  - Total: 702 km^{2} (271 sq mi) (177th)
  - Water (%): negligible

Population
  - 2023 census: 75,817 (185th)
  - Density: 108.001/km^{2} (279.7/sq mi) (75th)
- GDP (PPP): 2025 estimate
  - Total: ▲$451 million
  - Per capita: ▲$4,768
- GDP (nominal): 2025 estimate
  - Total: ▲$500 million
  - Per capita: ▲$5,291
- Gini (2013): 40.1 medium inequality
- HDI (2023): ▼0.615 medium (149th)
- Currency: United States dollar (USD)
- Time zone: UTC+10 and +11
- Date format: MM/DD/YYYY
- Calling code: +691
- ISO 3166 code: FM
- Internet TLD: .fm
- 1. Regional languages used at state and municipal levels.

The Federated States of Micronesia (FSM), or simply Micronesia (/ˌmaɪkroʊˈniːʒə/), is an island country in Micronesia, a region of Oceania. The federation encompasses the majority of the Caroline Islands (excluding Palau) and consists of four states—from west to east: Yap, Chuuk, Pohnpei, and Kosrae—that span the western Pacific just north of the equator for a longitudinal distance of almost 2,700 km (1,700 mi). Together, the states comprise around 607 islands and a combined land area of approximately 702 km^{2} or 271 sq mi.

The entire island federation lies across the northern Pacific accordingly: northeast of Indonesia and Papua New Guinea, south of Guam and the Marianas, west of Nauru and the Marshall Islands, east of Palau and the Philippines, about 2,900 km (1,800 mi) north of eastern Australia, 3,400 km (2,100 mi) southeast of Japan, and some 4,000 km (2,485 mi) southwest of Honolulu of the Hawaiian Islands.

The country's total land area is relatively small, but its waters occupy nearly 3 million km^{2} (1.2 million mi^{2}) of the Pacific Ocean, giving the country the 14th-largest exclusive economic zone in the world. The nation's capital is Palikir, on Pohnpei Island, and its largest city is Weno, an island municipality in the Chuuk Lagoon.

Each of its four states is centered on one or more main volcanic islands, and all but Kosrae include numerous outlying atolls. The FSM spreads across part of the Caroline Islands in the wider region of Micronesia, which region consists of thousands of small islands divided among several countries. The term Micronesia may refer to the Federated States of Micronesia or to the region as a whole.

The FSM was a part of the former Trust Territory of the Pacific Islands (TTPI), a United Nations Trust Territory administered by the United States from 1947 to 1994. On May 10, 1979, the islands ratified a constitutional government and then became a sovereign state after attaining independence on November 3, 1986—under a Compact of Free Association with the United States. Other neighboring island entities (also former members of the TTPI) also formed constitutional governments, becoming the Republic of the Marshall Islands and the Republic of Palau. The FSM has a seat in the United Nations and has been a member of the Pacific Community since 1983.

== History ==
=== Early settlement and Nan Madol ===
The ancestors of the Micronesians settled over four thousand years ago. A decentralized chieftain-based system eventually evolved into a more centralized economic and religious culture centered on Yap Island.

Nan Madol, a UNESCO World Heritage Site, consisting of a series of small artificial islands linked by a network of canals, is often called the Venice of the Pacific. It is located on the eastern periphery of the island of Pohnpei and used to be the ceremonial and political seat of the Saudeleur dynasty that united Pohnpei's estimated 25,000 people from about AD 500 until 1500 when the centralized system collapsed.

=== European contact and colonial rule ===
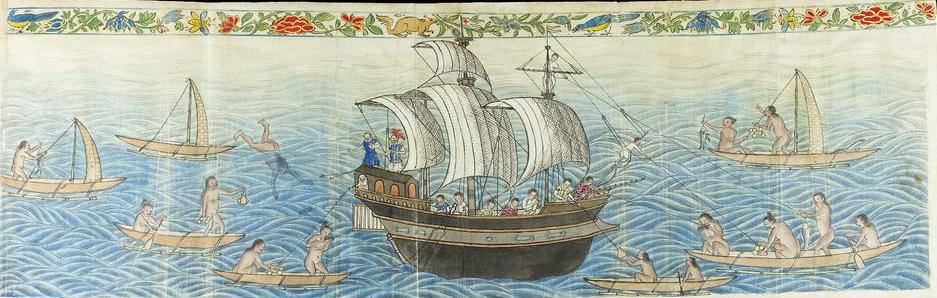
Manila Galleon in the Marianas and Carolinas, c. 1590 Boxer Codex

European explorers—first the Portuguese in search of the Spice Islands (Indonesia) and then the Spanish—reached the Carolines in the sixteenth century. The Treaty of Tordesillas gave these lands to Spain and the Spanish incorporated the archipelago to the Spanish East Indies through the capital, Manila, and in the 19th century established several outposts and missions. In 1887, they founded the town of Santiago de la Ascensión in what today is Kolonia on the island of Pohnpei.

In the 1870s, Germany began extending its sphere of influence in the Caroline Islands, leading to the Carolines Question of 1885 in which Pope Leo XIII was asked to determine if Germany or Spain had authority over the islands. The result was a confirmation of Spanish authority over the islands, but Germany would have free access to the islands.

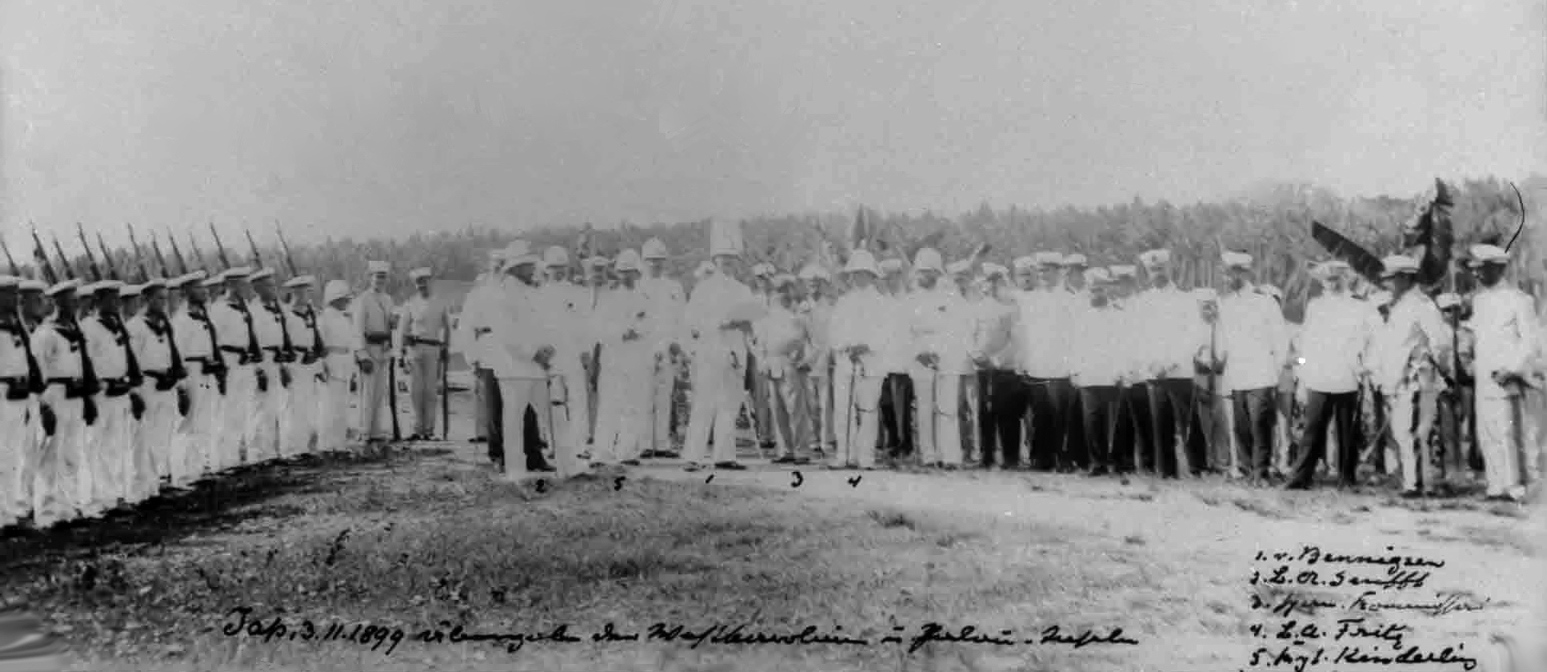
Handover Ceremony of the Western Caroline Islands and Palau by Spain to the German Empire on the island of Yap, 3 November 1899

Following defeat in the Spanish–American War, the Spanish sold the archipelago to Germany in 1899 under the German–Spanish Treaty of 1899. Germany incorporated it into German New Guinea. (A few remote islands, notably Kapingamarangi, were not specifically named in the treaty, but this remained unnoticed until the late 1940s and, while acknowledging the historical curiosity in 1949, Spain has made no modern claims to the islands.)

During World War I, it was captured by Japan. Following the war, the League of Nations awarded a mandate for Japan to administer the islands as part of the South Seas Mandate.

=== World War II and the aftermath ===
==== Operation Hailstone ====
Truk Lagoon served as a significant base for the Imperial Japanese Navy during World War II. In February 1944, the U.S. Navy launched Operation Hailstone, a massive air and surface attack on Truk Lagoon. Over two days, U.S. carrier aircraft and surface vessels targeted Japanese warships, merchant vessels, and shore installations, resulting in the sinking of numerous ships and the destruction of hundreds of aircraft. This operation severely diminished Japan's naval capabilities in the Pacific.

==== U.S. administration under the United Nations ====
Following World War II, the islands of Micronesia were placed under the administration of the United States as part of the Trust Territory of the Pacific Islands. This arrangement was formalized on 2 April 1947, with the adoption of United Nations Security Council Resolution 21, which approved the terms of trusteeship for the Pacific Islands formerly under Japanese mandate.

=== Path to independence ===
On May 10, 1979, four of the Trust Territory districts ratified a new constitution to become the Federated States of Micronesia. Palau, the Marshall Islands, and the Northern Mariana Islands chose not to participate. The FSM signed a Compact of Free Association with the United States, which entered into force on November 3, 1986, marking Micronesia's emergence from trusteeship to independence. Independence was formally concluded under international law in 1990, when the United Nations officially ended the Trusteeship status pursuant to Security Council Resolution 683. The Compact was renewed in 2004.

In February 2021, due to a bitter leadership dispute, the Federated States of Micronesia announced it would quit the Pacific Islands Forum in its formal process of withdrawal. However, in June 2022, the Suva Agreement was reached and the Federated States of Micronesia agreed to remain in the forum.

== Politics ==
The Federated States of Micronesia is governed by the 1979 constitution, which guarantees fundamental human rights and establishes a separation of governmental powers. This constitution structures the national government to be similar to—but not exactly like—that of the United States. The unicameral Congress has fourteen members elected by popular vote. Four senators—one from each state—serve four-year terms; the remaining ten senators represent single-member districts based on population and serve two-year terms. Congress elects the President and Vice President from among the four state-based senators to serve four-year terms in the executive branch. Their congressional seats are then filled by special elections.

An appointed cabinet supports the president and vice president. There are no formal political parties.

=== Defense and foreign affairs ===
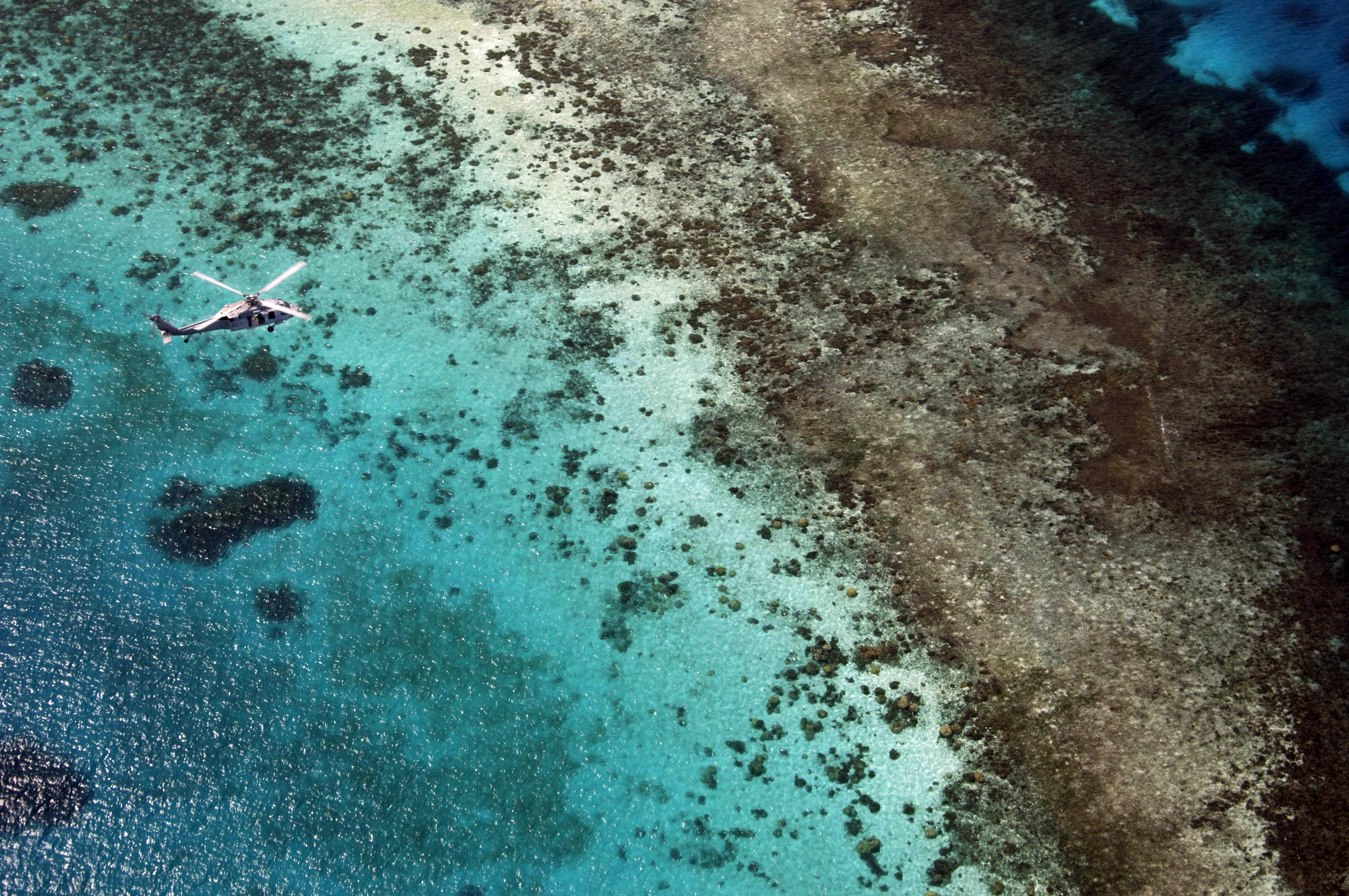
Sea Hawk helicopter (US Navy) flies over the waters of Chuuk, Micronesia.

In international politics, the Federated States of Micronesia has often voted with the United States concerning United Nations General Assembly resolutions.

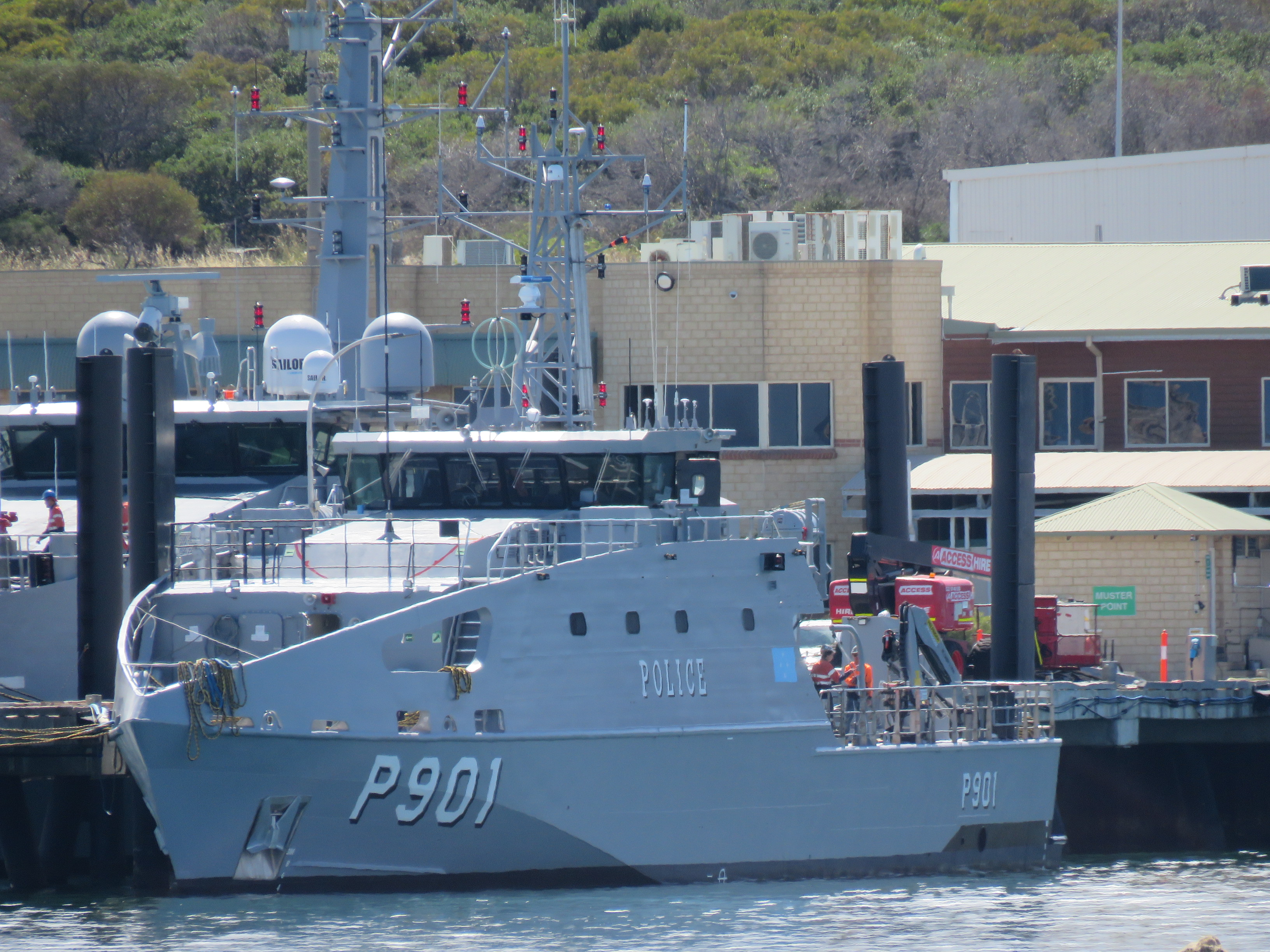
The FSS Tosiwo Nakayama, a Guardian-class patrol boat of the Federated States of Micronesia

The FSM is a sovereign, self-governing state in free association with the United States of America, which is wholly responsible for its defense. The FSM National Police operates a Maritime Wing Unit. The Compact of Free Association allows FSM citizens to join the U.S. military without having to obtain U.S. permanent residency or citizenship, allows for immigration and employment for Micronesians in the U.S., and establishes economic and technical aid programs.

The FSM has foreign relations with 56 countries, including the Holy See and the Sovereign Military Order of Malta. FSM was admitted to the United Nations based on the Security Council's recommendation on August 9, 1991, in Resolution 703 and the General Assembly's approval on September 17, 1991, in Resolution 46/2. The FSM was an active member of the Pacific Islands Forum. However, in February 2021, FSM announced it would be formally withdrawing from the Forum in a joint statement with Marshall Islands, Kiribati, and Nauru after a dispute regarding Henry Puna's election as the Forum's secretary-general. In February 2022, following the Russian invasion of Ukraine, FSM severed its diplomatic relations with Russia and called the invasion "unjustified and brutal".

=== States ===
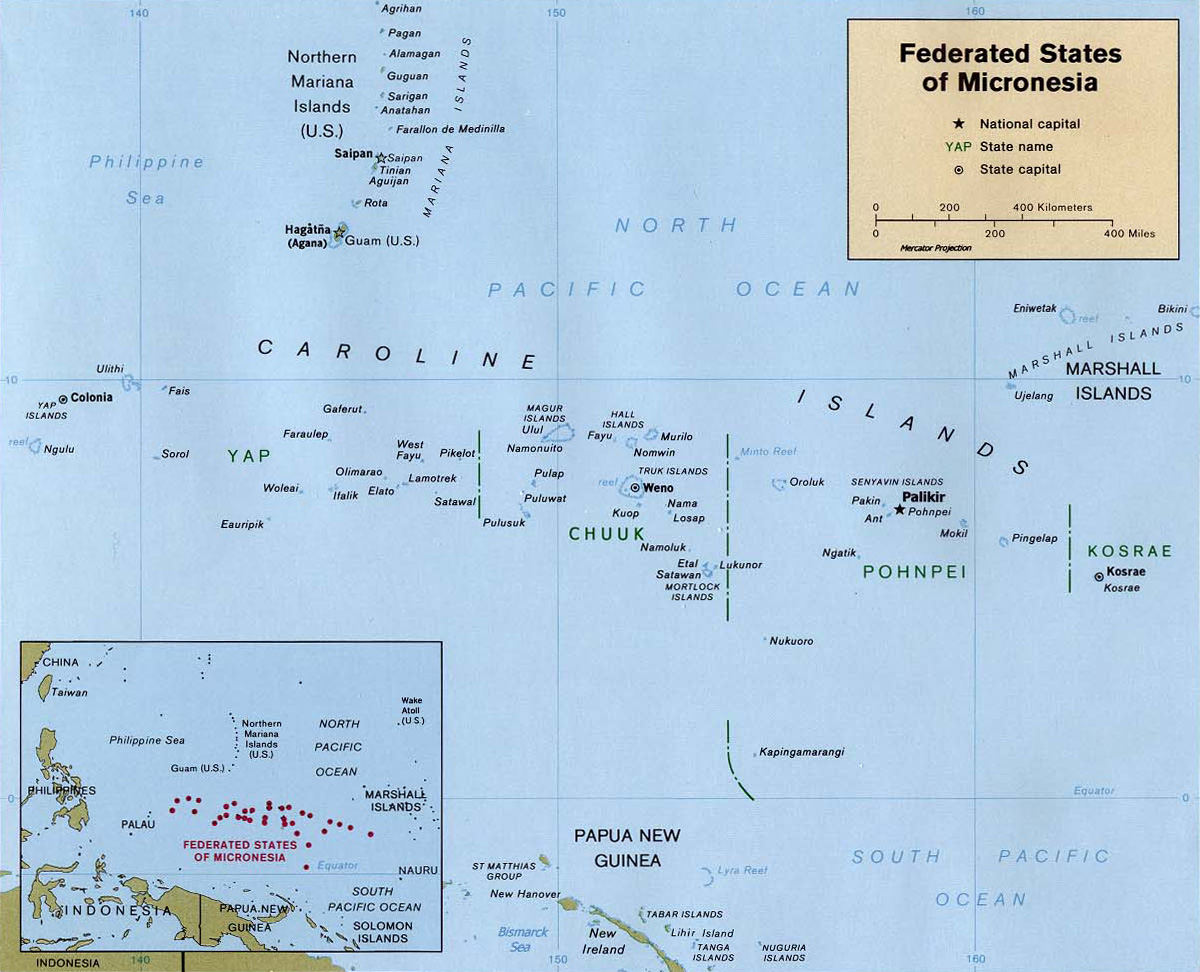
A map of the Federated States of Micronesia

The four states in the federation are, from west to east:

Flag	States	Capital	Current Governor	Land		Population	Population density	
Flag	States	Capital	Current Governor	km^{2}	sq mi	Population	per km^{2}	per sq mi
Yap State	Yap	Colonia	Francis Itimai (Acting)	118.1	45.6	10,739	91	236
Chuuk State	Chuuk	Weno	Alexander R. Narruhn	127.4	49.2	33,885	266	689
Pohnpei State	Pohnpei	Kolonia	Stevenson Joseph	345.5	133.4	26,102	75	196
Kosrae	Kosrae	Tofol	Tulensa Palik	109.6	42.3	5,092	46	120

These states are further divided into municipalities.

== Geography ==
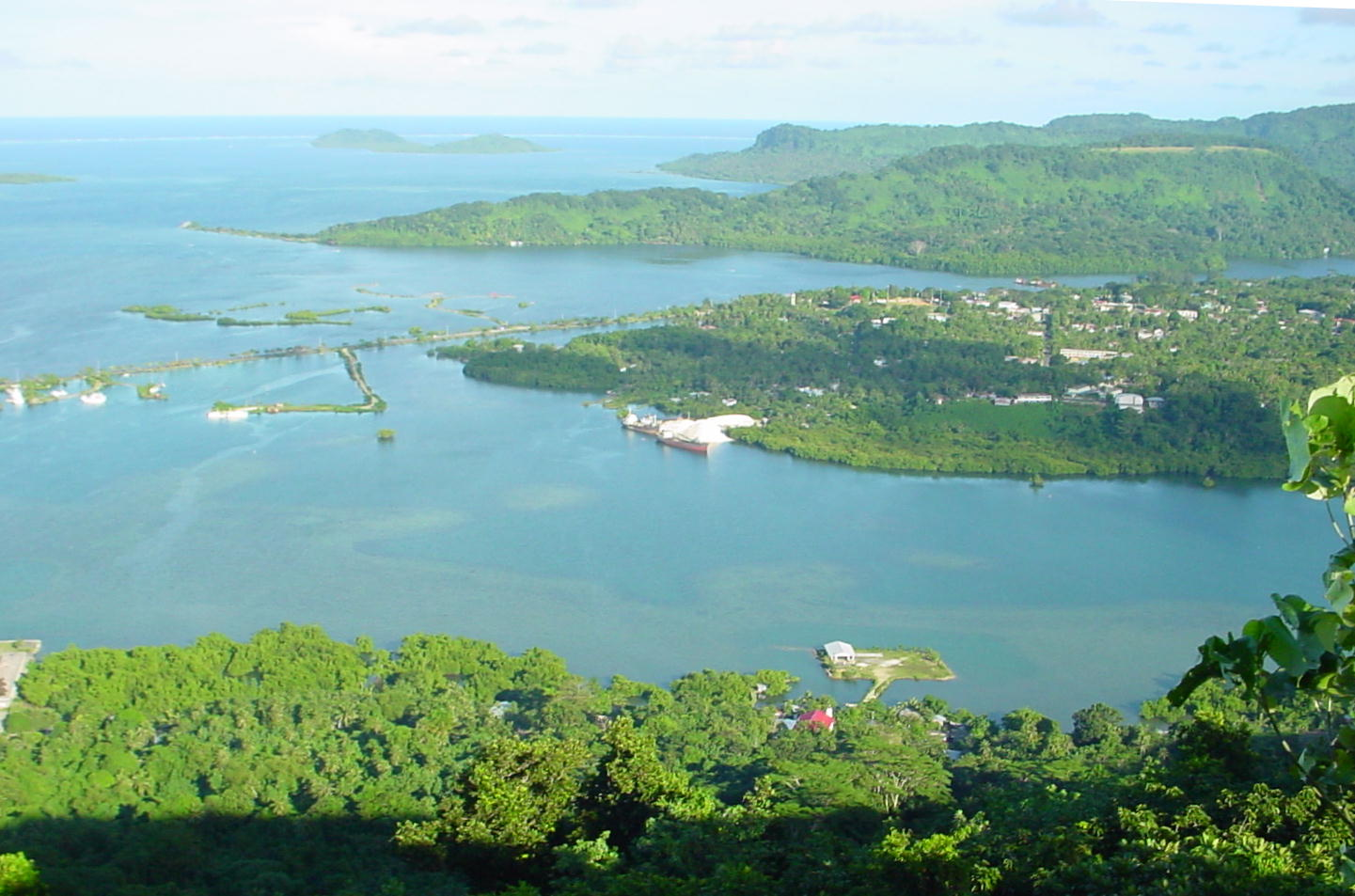
A view of Kolonia Town from Sokehs Ridge in Pohnpei

The Federated States of Micronesia consists of 607 islands extending 2,900 km (1,802 mi) across the archipelago of the Caroline Islands east of the Philippines. The islands have a combined area of 702 km^{2} (271 sq mi).

The islands are grouped into four states, which are Yap, Chuuk (called Truk until January 1990), Pohnpei (known as "Ponape" until November 1984), and Kosrae (formerly Kusaie). These four states are each represented by a white star on the national flag. The capital is Palikir, on Pohnpei.

Two terrestrial ecoregions lie within the country's borders: Carolines tropical moist forests and Yap tropical dry forests. It had a 2019 Forest Landscape Integrity Index mean score of 7.55/10, ranking it 37th globally out of 172 countries.

=== Biodiversity ===
The Federated States of Micronesia (FSM) is recognized as a biodiversity hotspot, hosting approximately 3,025 animal species and 1,553 plant species. The diversity of terrestrial plants and animals within the FSM varies from east to west due to differences in climate, geology, topography, and geographical isolation.

Over 457 plant species have been introduced to the islands of the FSM by early Micronesians and subsequent settlers. The FSM comprises 607 islands extending 2,900 km across the Caroline Islands, with a combined area of 702 km^{2}. The FSM has 58 Key Biodiversity Areas.

The region is characterized by thousands of isolated small coral atolls and higher volcanic islands, contributing to its high biodiversity. The FSM's National Biodiversity Strategy and Action Plan outlines efforts to protect and conserve its rich biodiversity. The FSM's marine biodiversity is under pressure due to growing population demands, leading to increased degradation of marine resources.

=== Climate ===
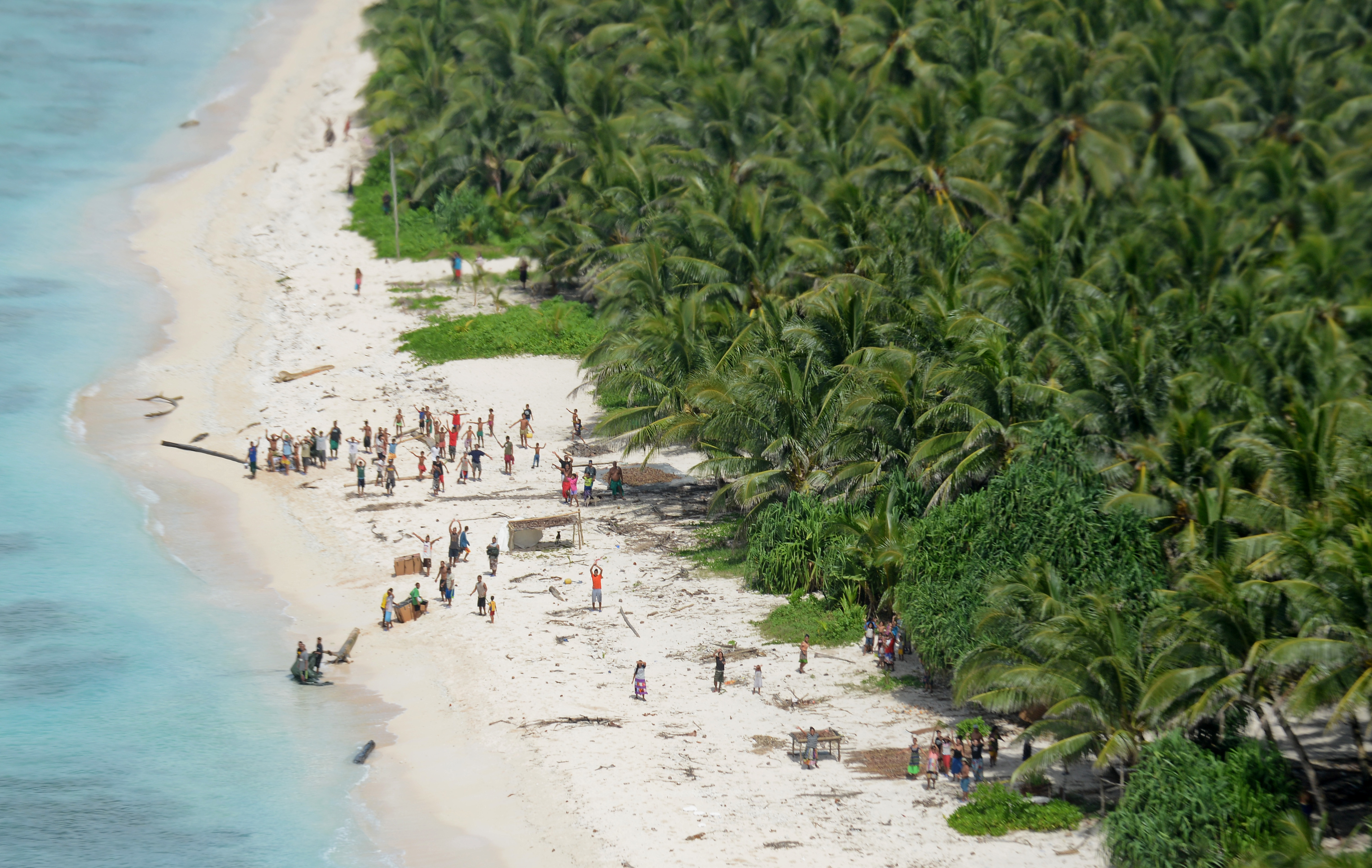
Satawal island, Yap State

The Federated States of Micronesia has a tropical rainforest climate (Köppen: Af). The weather is warm, humid and rainy all year round. The islands are located north of the equator and are affected by constant trade winds, which temper the climate. Minimum temperatures range all year round between 22 and 25 °C, and maximum temperatures between 30 and 32 °C. The abundant precipitations oscillate between 2500 and 5000 mm per year, although in the faces oriented to the wind they can surpass 6000 mm. Mount Nahnalaud, only 750 m high, on the island of Pohnpei, receives an average of 10,160 mm, being one of the rainiest places on earth, with almost always overcast skies. In general, the rains are produced by showers and storms of short duration but very intense. The driest places are the flat atolls, where rainfall can drop below 3,000 mm. The driest months are January and February, with no less than 250 mm and 20 days of rain.

Climate patterns in the FSM are also affected by the El Niño-Southern Oscillation, leading to considerable variability in weather conditions from year to year. During El Niño events, the region may experience increased rainfall and storm activity, while La Niña events can bring drier conditions and potential droughts.

Climate data for Palikir (Köppen Af)
Month	Jan	Feb	Mar	Apr	May	Jun	Jul	Aug	Sep	Oct	Nov	Dec	Year
Mean daily maximum °C (°F)	29.9 (85.8)	30.0 (86.0)	30.2 (86.4)	30.2 (86.4)	30.3 (86.5)	30.4 (86.7)	30.6 (87.1)	30.8 (87.4)	30.9 (87.6)	30.9 (87.6)	30.7 (87.3)	30.3 (86.5)	30.4 (86.8)
Daily mean °C (°F)	26.8 (80.2)	26.9 (80.4)	27.1 (80.8)	26.9 (80.4)	26.9 (80.4)	26.8 (80.2)	26.6 (79.9)	26.7 (80.1)	26.8 (80.2)	26.8 (80.2)	26.8 (80.2)	27.0 (80.6)	26.8 (80.3)
Mean daily minimum °C (°F)	23.8 (74.8)	23.9 (75.0)	24.0 (75.2)	23.7 (74.7)	23.6 (74.5)	23.3 (73.9)	22.7 (72.9)	22.6 (72.7)	22.7 (72.9)	22.7 (72.9)	22.9 (73.2)	23.7 (74.7)	23.3 (74.0)
Average precipitation mm (inches)	377 (14.8)	279 (11.0)	353 (13.9)	462 (18.2)	502 (19.8)	464 (18.3)	504 (19.8)	515 (20.3)	464 (18.3)	469 (18.5)	421 (16.6)	392 (15.4)	5,202 (204.9)
Source: Climate-Data.org

== Transportation ==
The Federated States of Micronesia is served by four international airports.

- Pohnpei International Airport, on the main island of Pohnpei State.
- Chuuk International Airport, located on the main island of Chuuk State.
- Kosrae International Airport, located on the main island of Kosrae State.
- Yap International Airport, located on the main island of Yap State.

== Economy ==
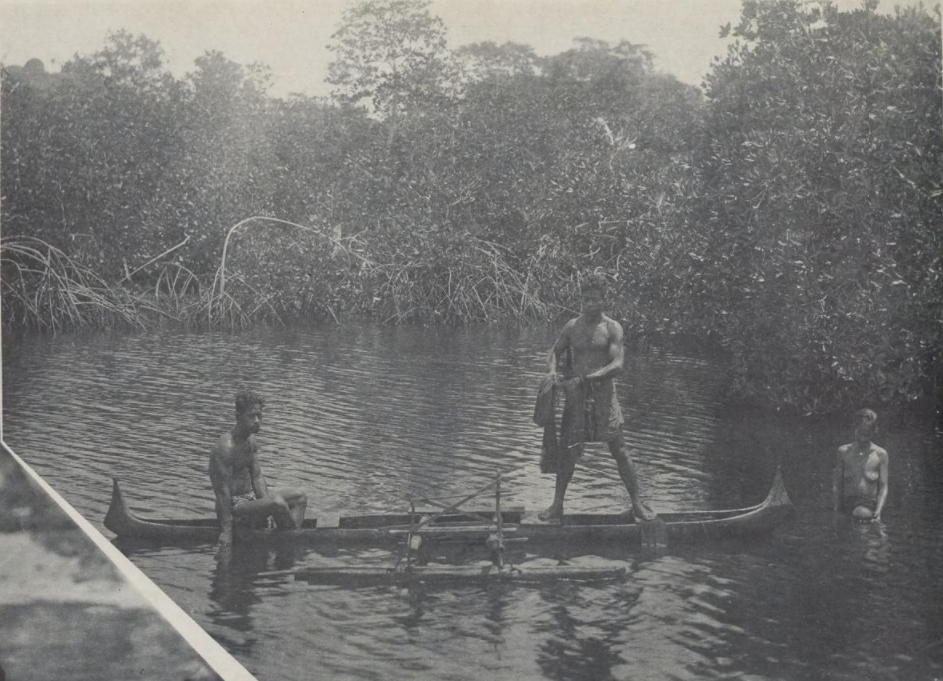
Fishing in Chuuk, 1931

Economic activity in the Federated States of Micronesia consists primarily of subsistence farming and fishing. The islands have few mineral deposits worth exploiting, except for high-grade phosphate. Long line fishing of tuna is also viable with foreign vessels from China that operated in the 1990s. The potential for a tourist industry exists, but the remoteness of the location and a lack of adequate facilities hinder development. Financial assistance from the U.S. is the primary source of revenue, with the U.S. pledged to spend $1.3 billion in the islands in 1986–2001; when the Compact was amended in 2004, the United States committed to providing $110 million in development aid through 2023. The CIA World Factbook lists high dependence on U.S. aid as one of the main concerns of the FSM. Geographical isolation and a poorly developed infrastructure are major impediments to long-term growth.

== Society ==
=== Demographics ===
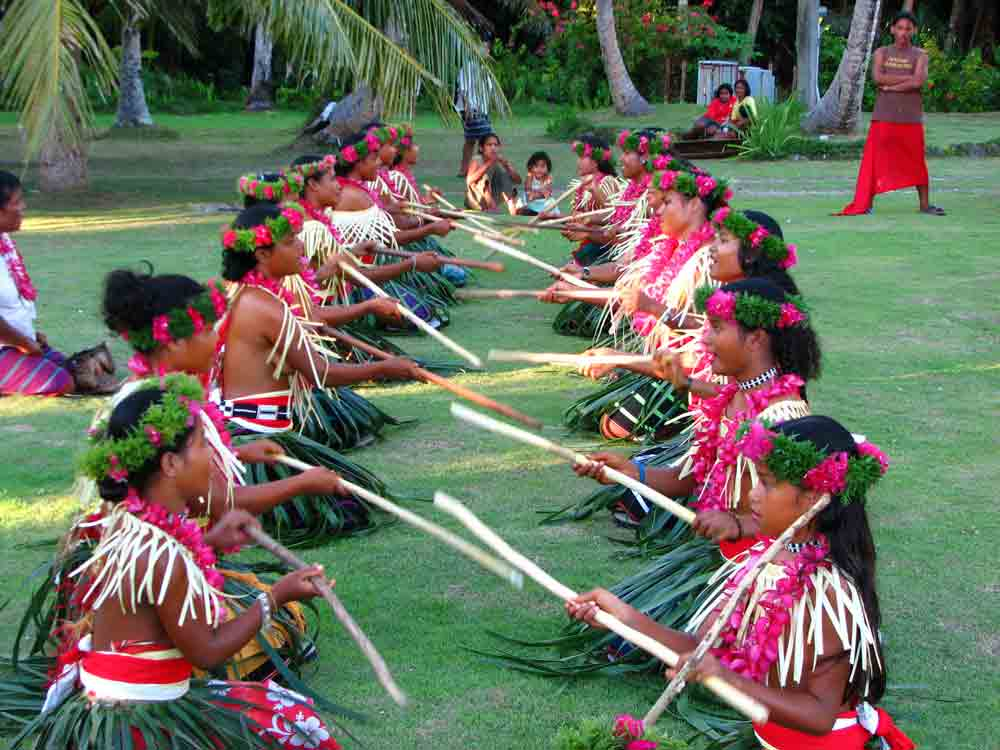
People performing a welcome ceremony on the Ulithi atoll

The indigenous population of the nation, which is predominantly Micronesian, consists of various ethnolinguistic groups. It has a nearly 100% Pacific Islander and Asian population: Chuukese 48.8%, Pohnpeian 24.2%, Kosraean 6.2%, Yapese 5.2%, Yap outer islands 4.5%, Asian 1.8%, Polynesian 1.5%, other 6.4%, unknown 1.4%. A sizable minority also have some Japanese ancestry, which is a result of intermarriages between Japanese settlers and Micronesians during the Japanese colonial period.

There is also a growing expatriate population of Americans, Australians, Europeans, and residents from China and the Philippines since the 1990s. English has become the common language of the government, and for secondary and tertiary education. Outside of the main capital towns of the four FSM states, the local languages are primarily spoken. Spanish is offered at the university and the international secondary school. Growth remains high at more than 3% annually, offset somewhat by net emigration.

=== Languages ===
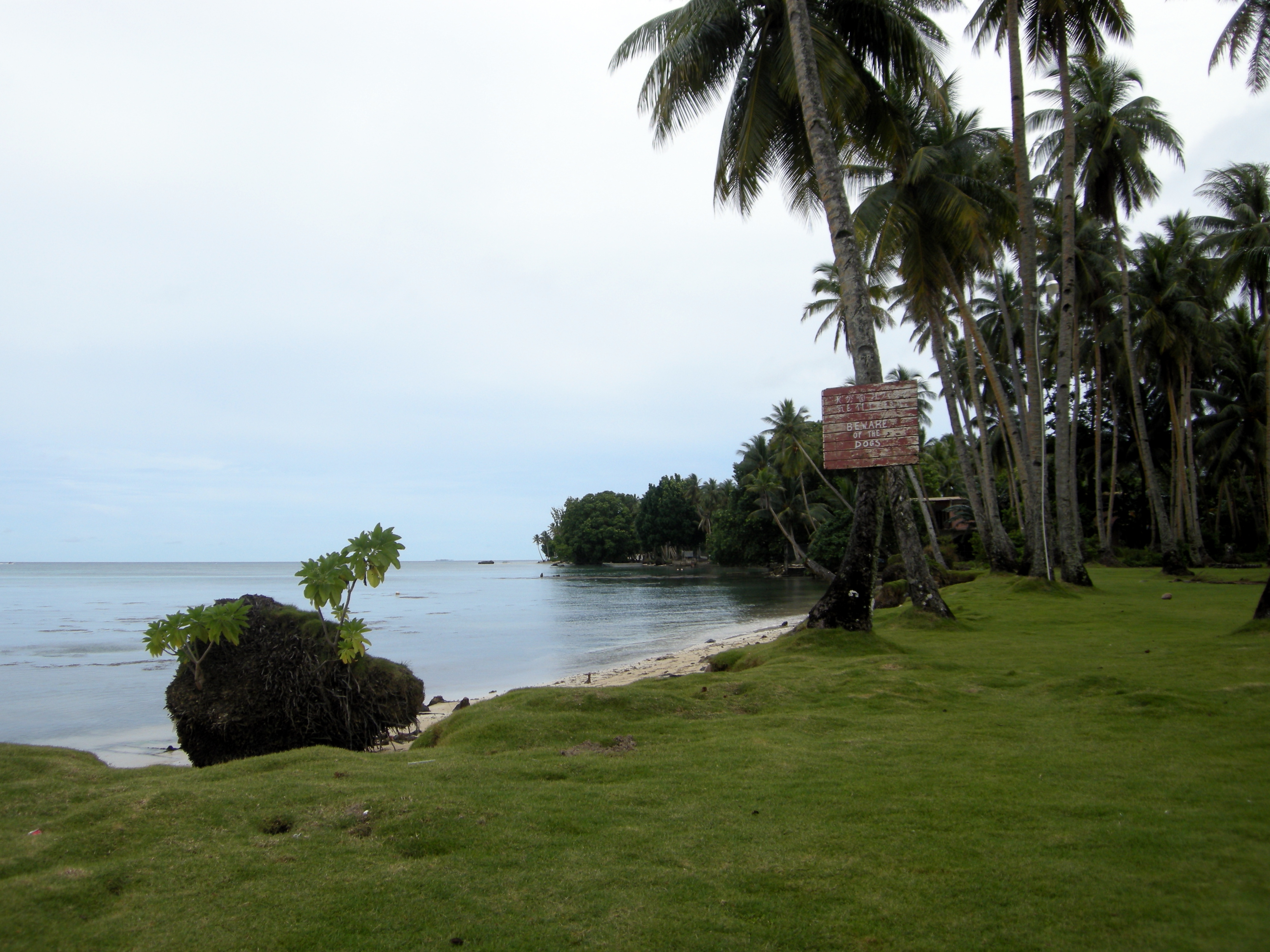
A beach in Chuuk

English is widely used and official language of the entire federation. In addition, there are 17 other endemic languages, some of which are official languages on state-level.

=== Religion ===
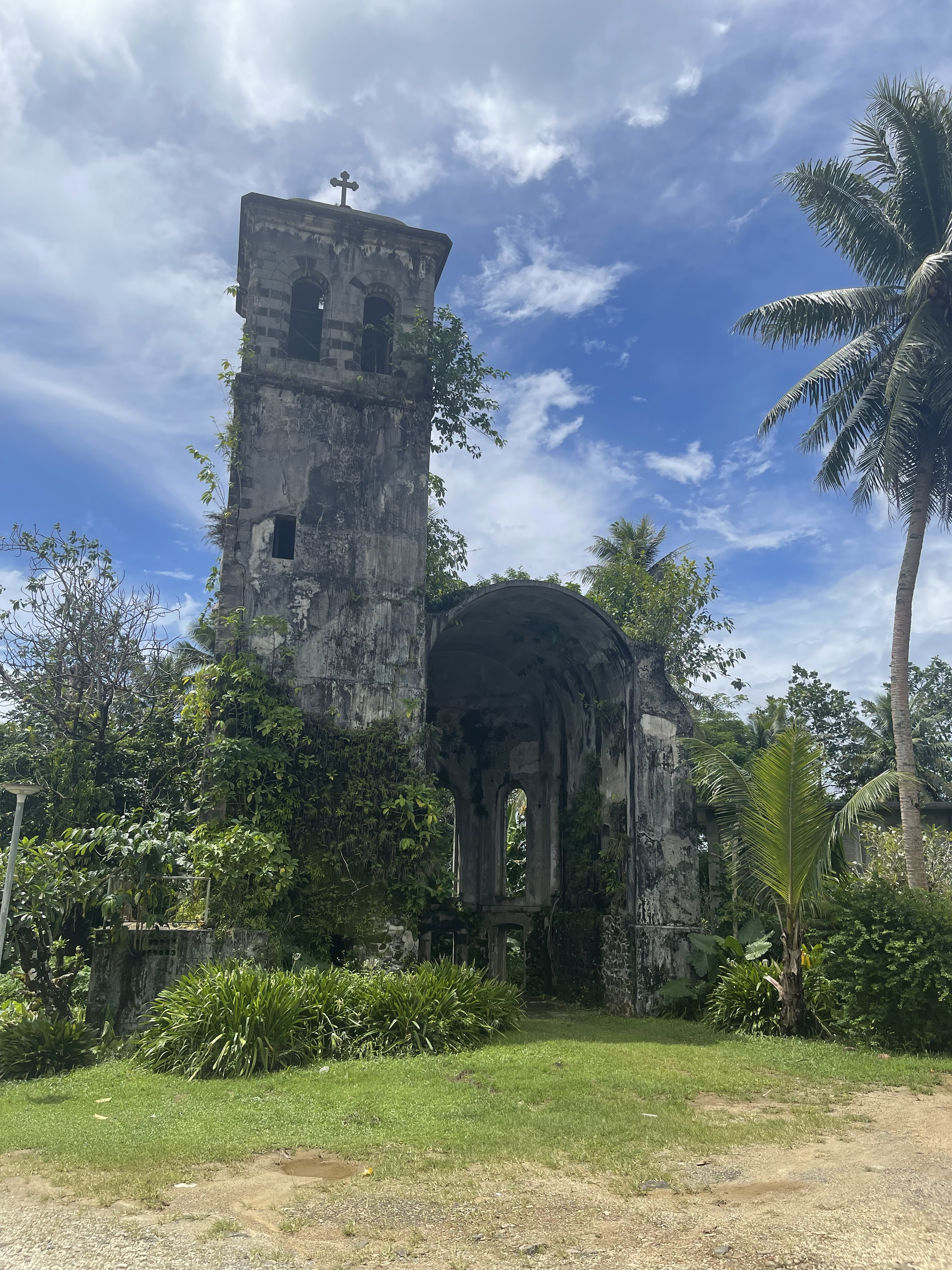
Cathedral of Ponape Belltower, in Kolonia, on the island of Pohnpei, built in 1909 by German Capuchin missionaries

The people of the Federated States of Micronesia are 97% Christian. More than half of the population follows the Catholic Church (55%) and about 42% follow various Protestant Christian groups. In general this is due to Spanish and German colonial history. Spanish rule meant that a large part of the population remained Catholic. During the German colonial period, until 1914, Catholic and Protestant missionaries from the German Empire were deployed. Several Protestant denominations, as well as the Roman Catholic Church, are present in every Micronesian state. Most Protestant groups trace their roots to American Congregationalist missionaries. On the island of Kosrae, the population is approximately 7,800; 95 percent are Protestants. On Pohnpei, the population of 35,000 is evenly divided between Protestants and Catholics. Most immigrants are Filipino Catholics who have joined local Catholic churches, e.g. Our Lady of Mercy Catholic Church in Pohnpei.

On Chuuk and Yap, an estimated 60 percent are Catholic and 40 percent are Protestant. Religious groups with small followings include Baptists, Assemblies of God, Salvation Army, Seventh-day Adventists, Jehovah's Witnesses, The Church of Jesus Christ of Latter-day Saints (Mormons), and the Baháʼí Faith. There is a small group of Buddhists on Pohnpei, and a small group of Ahmadiyya Muslims in both Pohnpei and Kosrae. Attendance at religious services is generally high; churches are well supported by their congregations and play a significant role in civil society.

In the 1890s, on the island of Pohnpei, intermissionary conflicts and the conversion of clan leaders resulted in religious divisions along clan lines which persist today. More Protestants live on the western side of the island, while more Catholics live on the eastern side. Missionaries of many religious traditions are present and operate freely. The Constitution provides for freedom of religion, and the Government generally respects this right in practice. The US government received no reports of societal abuses or discrimination based on religious belief or practice in 2007.

=== Health ===
Life expectancy was 66 for men and 69 for women in 2018.

Pingelap in Pohnpei State is notable for the prevalence of an extreme form of color blindness called achromatopsia, and known locally as maskun. Approximately 5% of the atoll's 3,000 inhabitants are afflicted.

== Sports ==
=== Baseball ===
Baseball is very popular in the FSM.

=== Association football ===
The sport of association football in the Federated States of Micronesia is run by the Federated States of Micronesia Football Association. They control the Micronesian Games, the nation's football championship and the Micronesia national football team.

=== FSMAA ===
The Federated States of Micronesia Athletic Association is the governing body for the country's sports and athletics.

== Culture ==
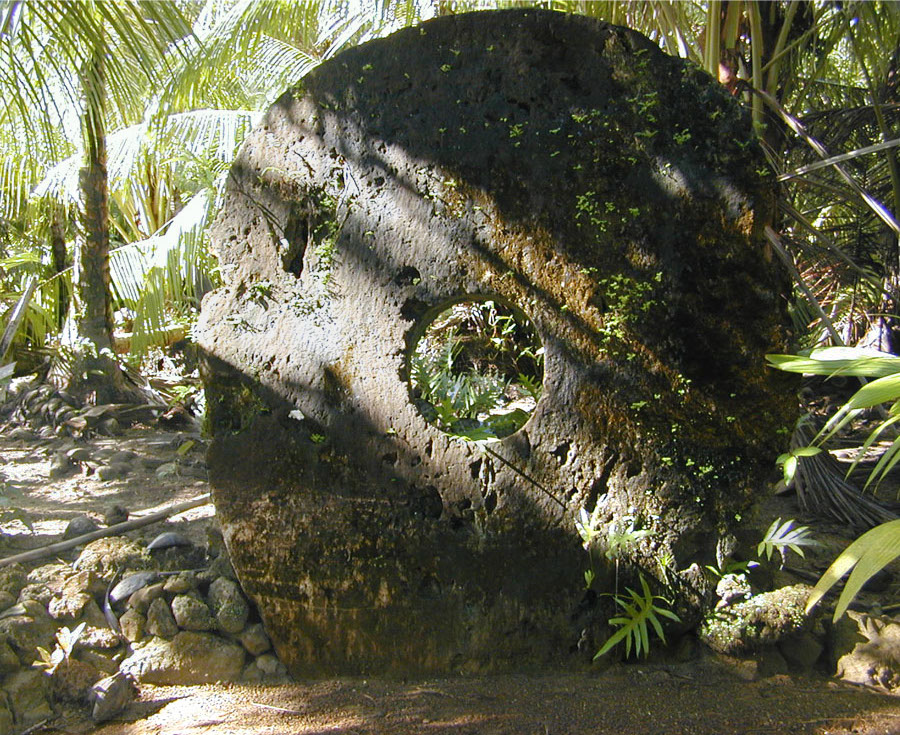
A large (approximately 2.4 m or about 8 ft in height) example of Yapese stone money (Rai stones) in the village of Gachpar

Each of the four states has its own culture and traditions, but there are also common cultural and economic bonds that are centuries old. Cultural similarities include the importance of the traditional extended family and clan systems and are found on all the islands.

The island of Yap is notable for its "stone money" (Rai stones), large disks usually of calcite, up to 4 meters (13 ft) in diameter, with a hole in the middle. The islanders, aware of the owner of a piece, do not necessarily move them when ownership changes. There are five major types: Mmbul, Gaw, Ray, Yar, and Reng, the last being only 30 cm (12 in) in diameter. Their value is based on both size and history, many of them having been brought from other islands, as far as New Guinea, but most coming in ancient times from Palau. Approximately 6,500 of them are scattered around the island.

Pohnpei is home to Nan Madol: Ceremonial Centre of Eastern Micronesia, a UNESCO World Heritage Site, but the site is currently listed as In Danger due to natural causes. The government is working on the conservation of the site.

=== Music ===
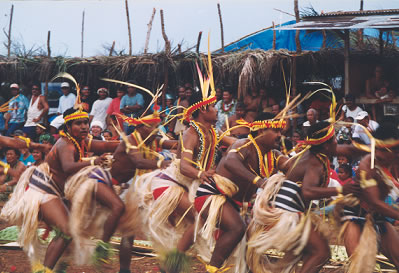
Yapese men dancing in traditional dress

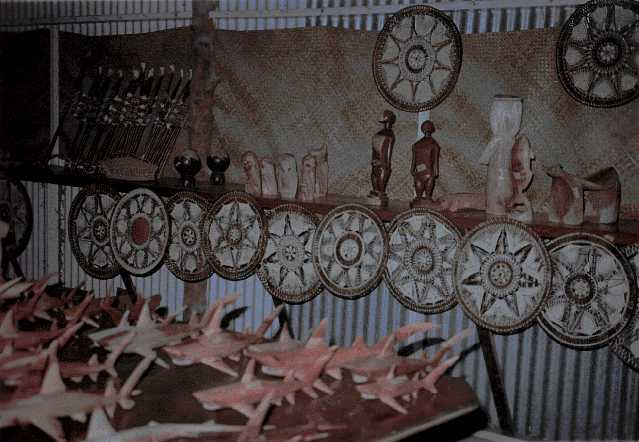
A shop in Pohnpei selling traditional souvenirs

Traditional dances on the main islands includes "stick dancing" on Pohnpei, Chuuk and Yap, standing dances on Chuuk and sitting dances on Yap and Chuuk. The Yapese are particularly known for their skills in dancing. The Yapese stick dance is performed by men, women and children together, while standing dances are performed either by women or men and boys, but never both together. The men participate in various dancing competitions, which are segregated by caste; the lower castes have some distinct dances, such as a woman's standing dance, but can only dance when authorized by a person of a higher caste.

=== Newspapers ===
The following papers have been published in the FSM:

- Pohnpei
  - The Kaselehlie Press — from 2001. English. Published biweekly.
  - Senyavin Times — from 1967 to the 1970s. Bilingual (Pohnpeian and English).
- Chuuk
  - Truk Chronicle — from 1979 to the 1980s. Published biweekly in English, with some articles in Carolinian.
- Kosrae
  - Kosrae State Newsletter — from 1983 to 2004. Published monthly in Kosraean.
- Yap
  - The Yap Networker — from 1999 to 2005. Published weekly in English.

=== Literature ===
There have been very few published literary writers from the Federated States of Micronesia. In 2008, Emelihter Kihleng became the first ever Micronesian to publish a collection of poetry in the English language.

== See also ==
- Outline of the Federated States of Micronesia
